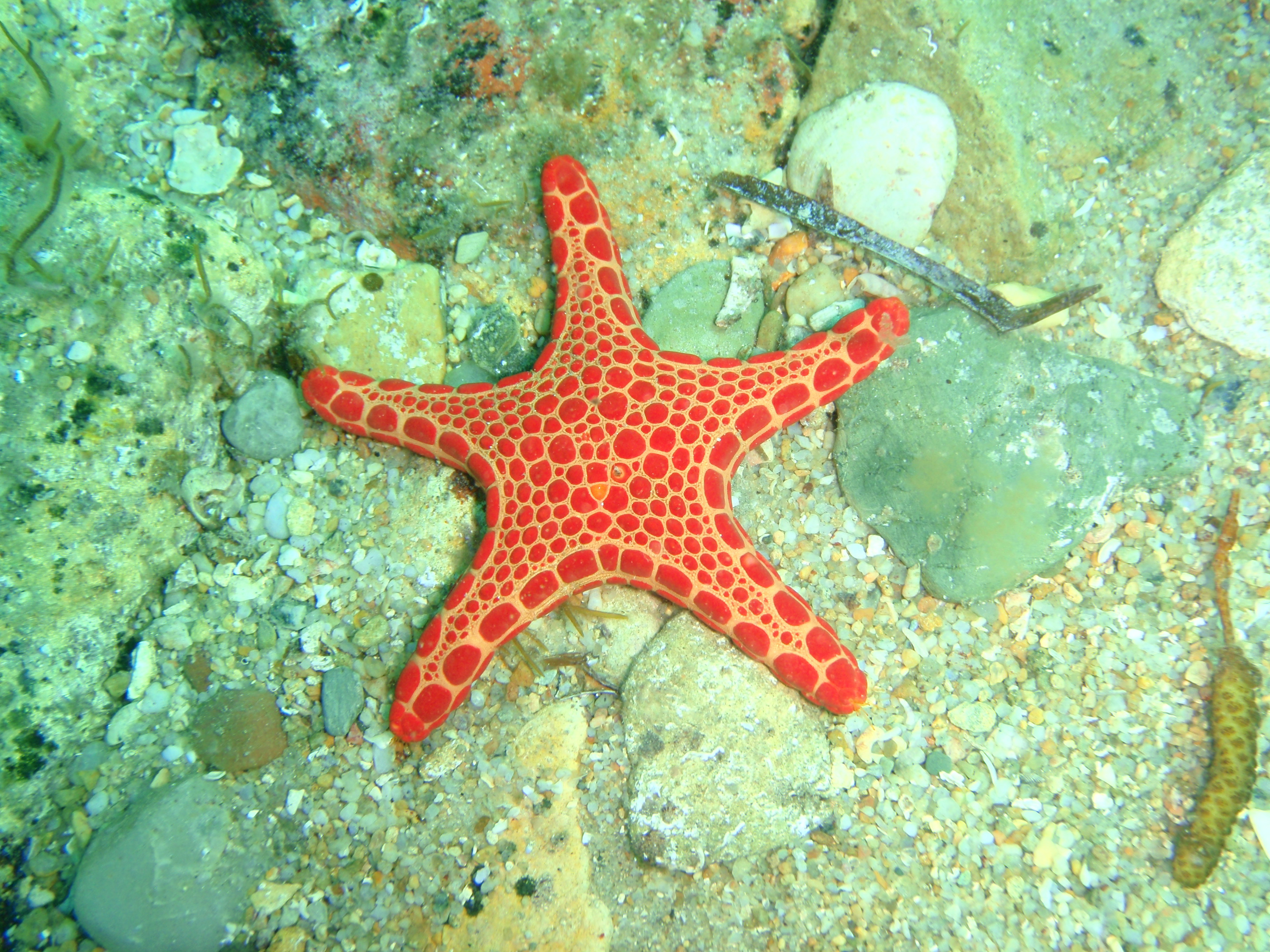
- Pentagonaster duebeni

Scientific classification
- Kingdom: Animalia
- Phylum: Echinodermata
- Class: Asteroidea
- Order: Valvatida
- Family: Goniasteridae; Forbes, 1841

Genera
- See text

= Goniasteridae =

Goniasteridae Temporal range: 182–Recent Ma

Family of starfishes

Goniasteridae (the biscuit stars) constitute the largest family of sea stars, included in the order Valvatida. They are mostly deep-dwelling species, but the family also include several colorful shallow tropical species.

== Description ==
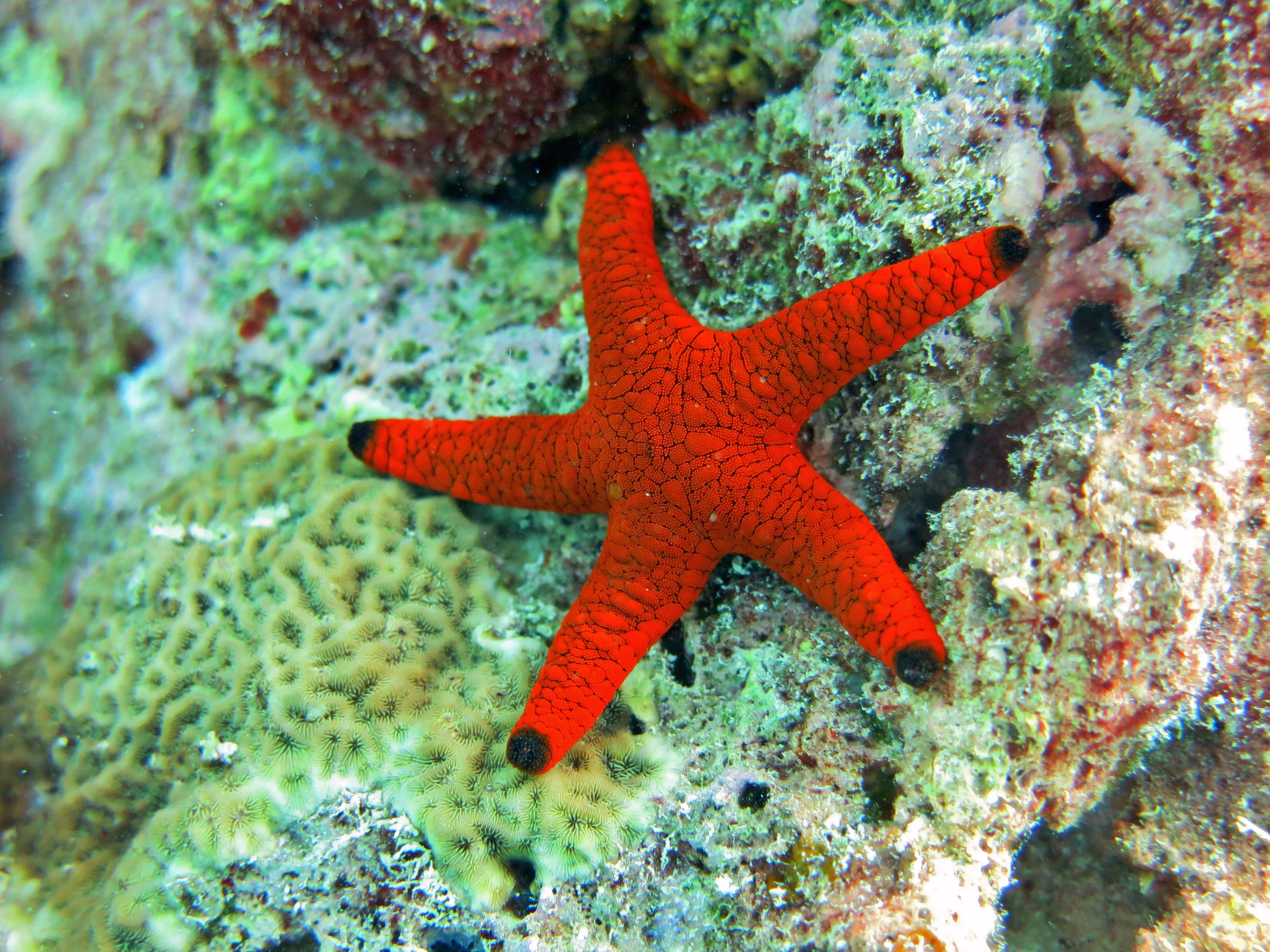
Fromia indica

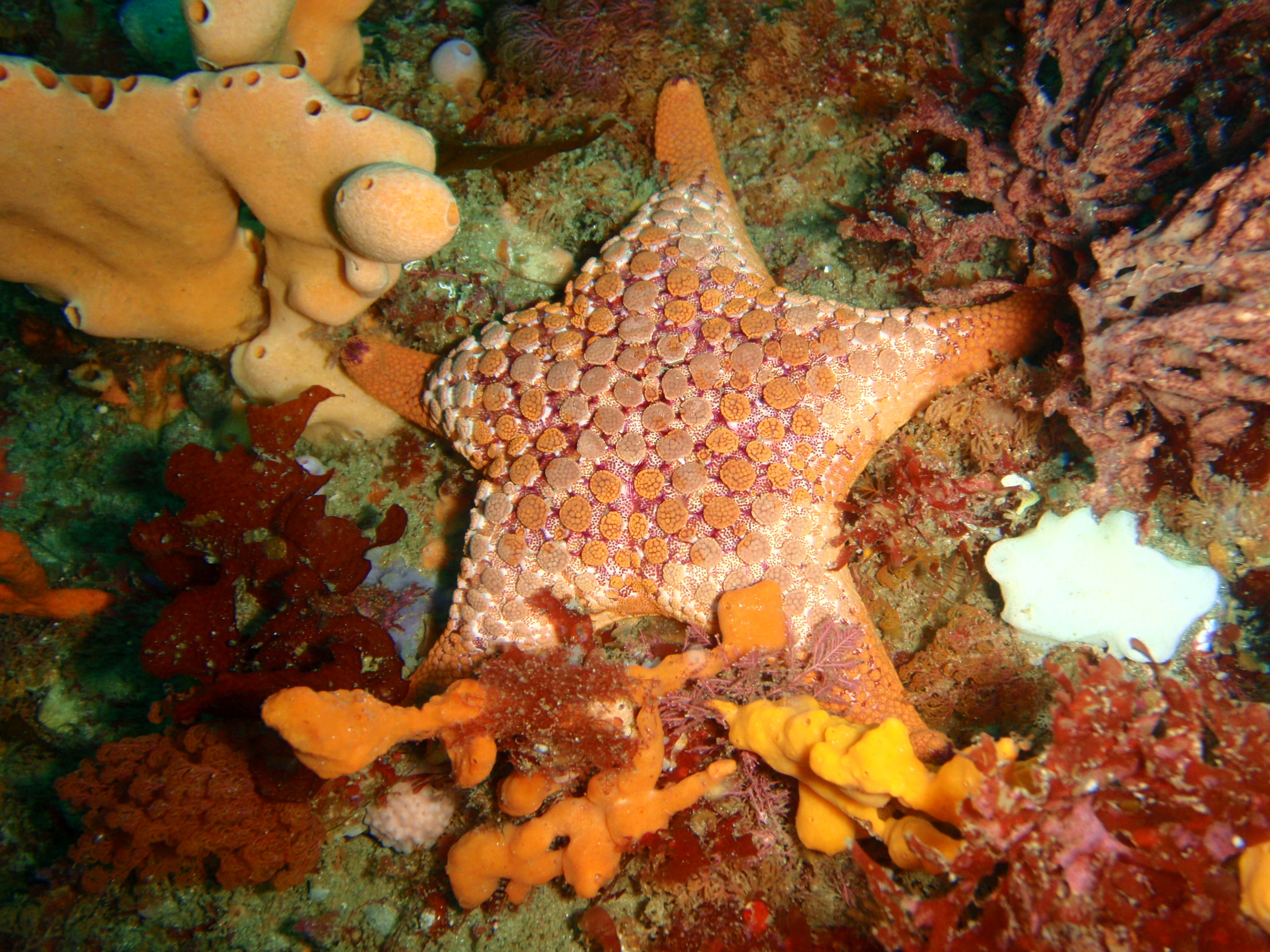
Nectria ocellata

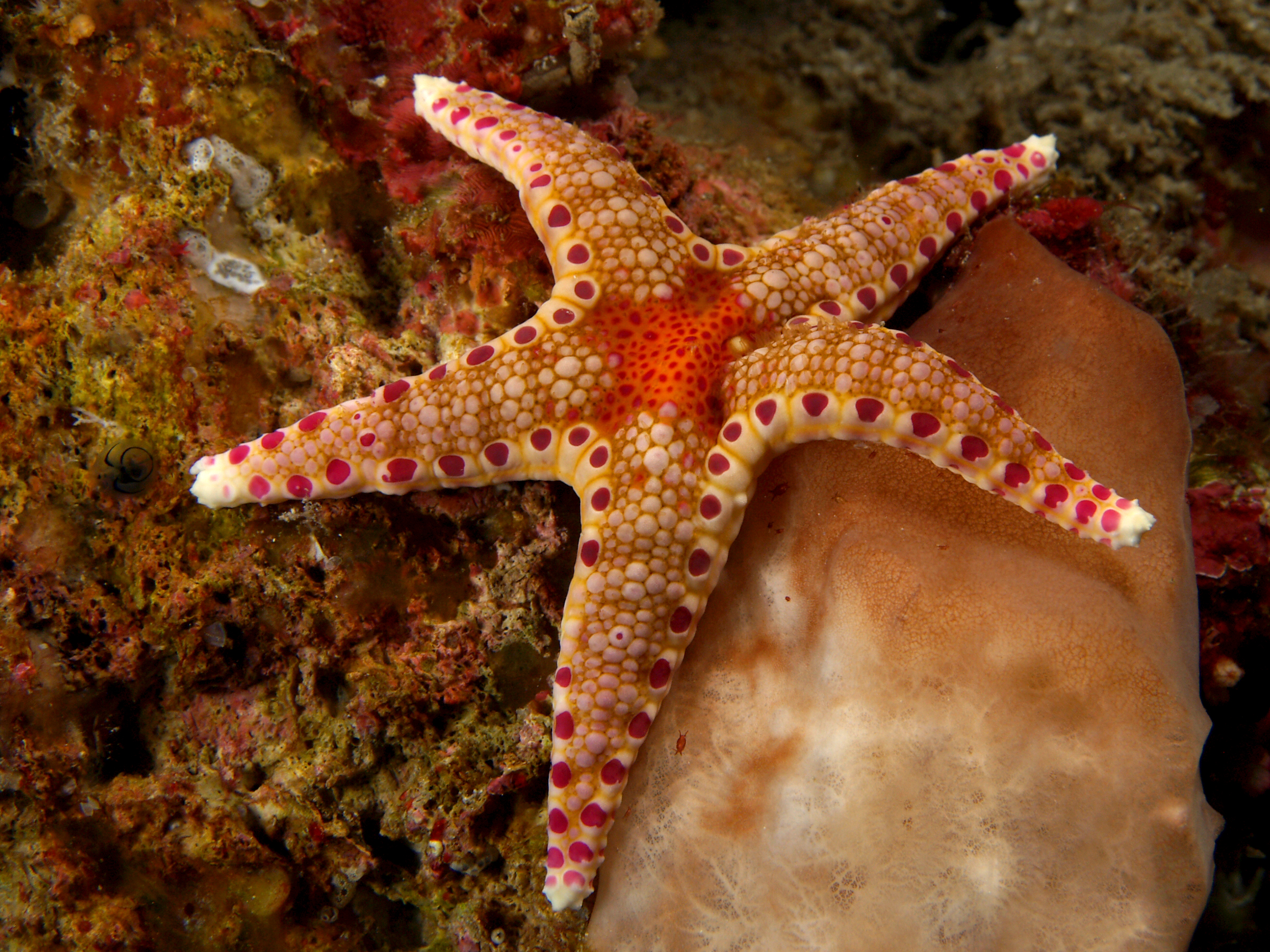
Neoferdina insolita

Goniasteridae are usually middle-sized sea stars with a characteristic double range of marginal plates bordering the disk and arms. Most of them have five arms, often short and triangular, around a broad central disc; many species are pentagonal or subpentagonal, covered densely with granular, seed-like protuberances, hence the name of the family "seed-star" (gonium+aster). The aboral face is often covered with tiny spines looking like paxillae. Pedicellariae are often valvate, and the gonads are located at the interradius.

Main identification keys for this group include the presence of paxillae, granules, teeth, spines, or the shape and dimensions of marginal plate.

== Location and habitat ==
They occur predominantly on deep-water continental shelf habitats (but a part of them inhabit shallow waters) in all the world's oceans, being the most diverse in the Indo-Pacific region.

== List of genera ==
About 260 extant species within 70 genera are currently known, which make this family the most diverse of all the sea stars, even if half of the genera are monospecific. Species belonging to the Ferdininae subfamily have been imported from Ophidiasteridae thanks to a large revision of these two families in 2017

According to World Register of Marine Species, this family includes the following genera:

- genus Alloceramaster Mah, 2025 -- 7 species
- genus Anthenoides Perrier, 1881 -- 10 species
- genus Apollonaster Halpern, 1970 -- 2 species
- genus Astroceramus Fisher, 1906 -- 9 species
- genus Astropatricia McKnight, 2006 -- 1 species
- genus Astrothauma Fisher, 1913 -- 1 species
- genus Atheraster Mah, 2022 -- 5 species
- genus Atelorias Fisher, 1911 -- 1 species
- genus Bathyceramaster Mah, 2016 -- 2 species
- genus Calliaster Gray, 1840 -- 12 species
- genus Calliderma Gray, 1847 -- 1 species
- genus Ceramaster Verrill, 1899 -- 18 species
- genus Chitonaster Sladen, 1889 -- 4 species
- genus Circeaster Koehler, 1909 -- 9 species
- genus Cladaster Verrill, 1899 -- 4 species
- genus Diplasiaster Halpern, 1970 -- 1 species
- genus Enigmaster McKnight & H.E.S. Clark, 1996 -- 1 species
- genus Eratosaster Mah, 2011 -- 1 species
- subfamily Ferdininae Mah 2017
  - genus Bathyferdina Mah 2017 -- 1 species
  - genus Eosaster Mah, 2017 -- 1 species
  - genus Ferdina Gray, 1840 -- 3 species
  - genus Kanakaster Mah, 2017 -- 6 species
  - genus Neoferdina Livingstone, 1931 -- 12 species
  - genus Paraferdina James, 1973 -- 3 species
- genus Floriaster Downey, 1980 -- 1 species
- genus Fromia Gray, 1840 -- 16 species
- genus Gigantaster Döderlein, 1924 -- 1 species
- genus Glyphodiscus Fisher, 1917 -- 3 species
- genus Goniaster L. Agassiz, 1836 -- 1 species
- subfamily Hippasterinae
  - genus Evoplosoma Fisher, 1906 -- 8 species
  - genus Gilbertaster Fisher, 1906 -- 2 species
  - genus Hippasteria Gray, 1840 -- 11 species
  - genus Sthenaster Mah, Nizinski & Lundsten, 2010 -- 1 species
- genus Iconaster Sladen, 1889 -- 4 species
- genus Johannaster Koehler, 1909 -- 1 species
- genus Kermitaster H.E.S. Clark, 2001 -- 1 species
- genus Lithosoma Fisher, 1911 -- 6 species
- genus Litonotaster Verrill, 1899 -- 4 species
- genus Lydiaster Koehler, 1909 -- 1 species
- genus Mabahissaster Macan, 1938 -- 1 species
- genus Mariaster A.H. Clark, 1916 -- 1 species
- genus Mediaster Stimpson, 1857 -- 17 species
- genus Milteliphaster Alcock, 1893 -- 2 species
- genus Nectria Gray, 1840 -- 8 species
- genus Neoferdina Livingstone, 1931 -- 6 species
- genus Notioceramus Fisher, 1940 -- 1 species
- genus Nymphaster Sladen, 1889 -- 16 species
- genus Ogmaster von Martens, 1865 -- 1 species
- genus Peltaster Verrill, 1899 -- 3 species
- subfamily Pentagonasterinae Perrier
  - genus Akelbaster Mah, 2007 -- 1 species
  - genus Anchitosia Mah, 2007 -- 1 species
  - genus Eknomiaster HES Clark in HES Clark & D.G. McKnight, 2001 -- 2 species
  - genus Pawsonaster Mah, 2007 -- 1 species
  - genus Pentagonaster Gray, 1840 -- 5 species
  - genus Ryukuaster Mah, 2007 -- 1 species
  - genus Toraster A.M. Clark, 1952 -- 1 species
  - genus Tosia Gray, 1840 -- 3 species
- genus Pergamaster Koehler, 1920 -- 2 species
- genus Pillsburiaster Halpern, 1970 -- 7 species
- genus Plinthaster Verrill, 1899 -- 5 species
- genus Pontioceramus Fisher, 1911 -- 1 species
- genus Progoniaster Döderlein, 1924 -- 1 species
- genus Pseudoceramaster Jangoux, 1981 -- 2 species
- genus Pseudogoniodiscaster Livingstone, 1930 -- 1 species
- genus Rosaster Perrier, 1894 -- 11 species
- genus Sibogaster Döderlein, 1924 -- 2 species
- genus Siraster H.L. Clark, 1915 -- 1 species
- genus Sphaeriodiscus Fisher, 1910 -- 7 species
- genus Stellaster Gray, 1840 -- 7 species
- genus Stellasteropsis Dollfus, 1936 -- 3 species
- genus Styphlaster H.L. Clark, 1938 -- 1 species
- genus Tessellaster H.L. Clark, 1941 -- 1 species
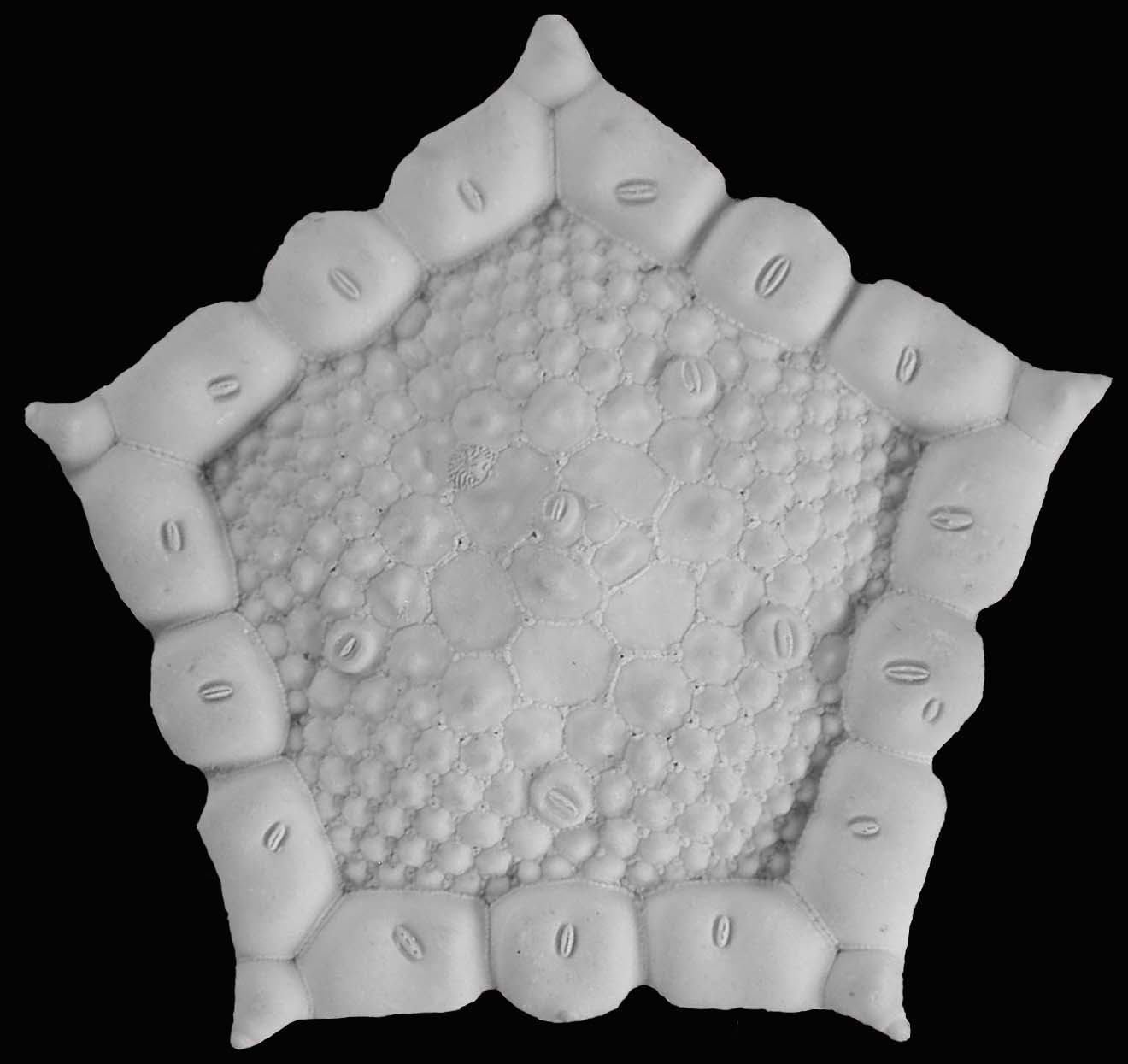
Akelbaster novaecaledoniae

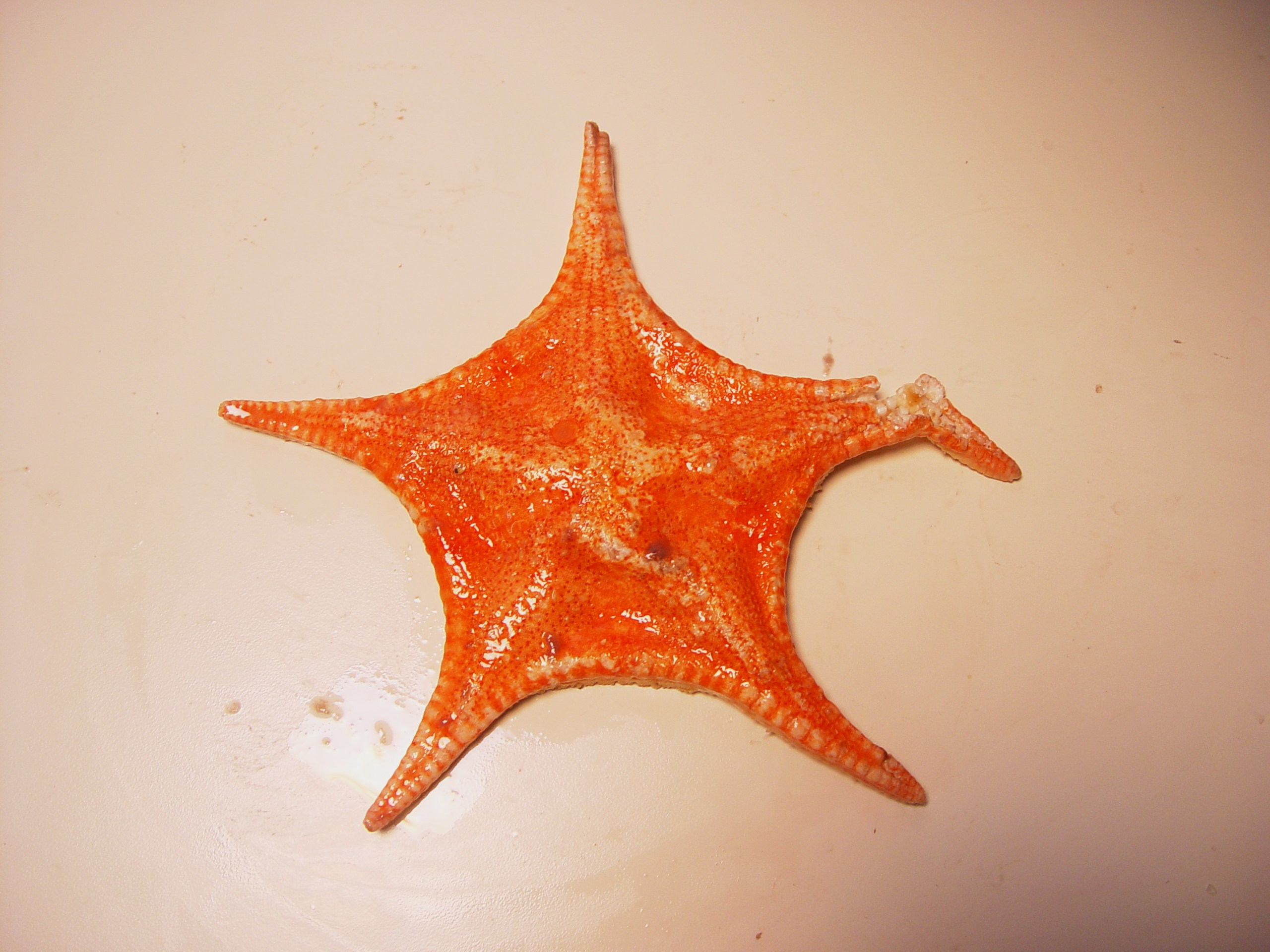
Anthenoides piercei

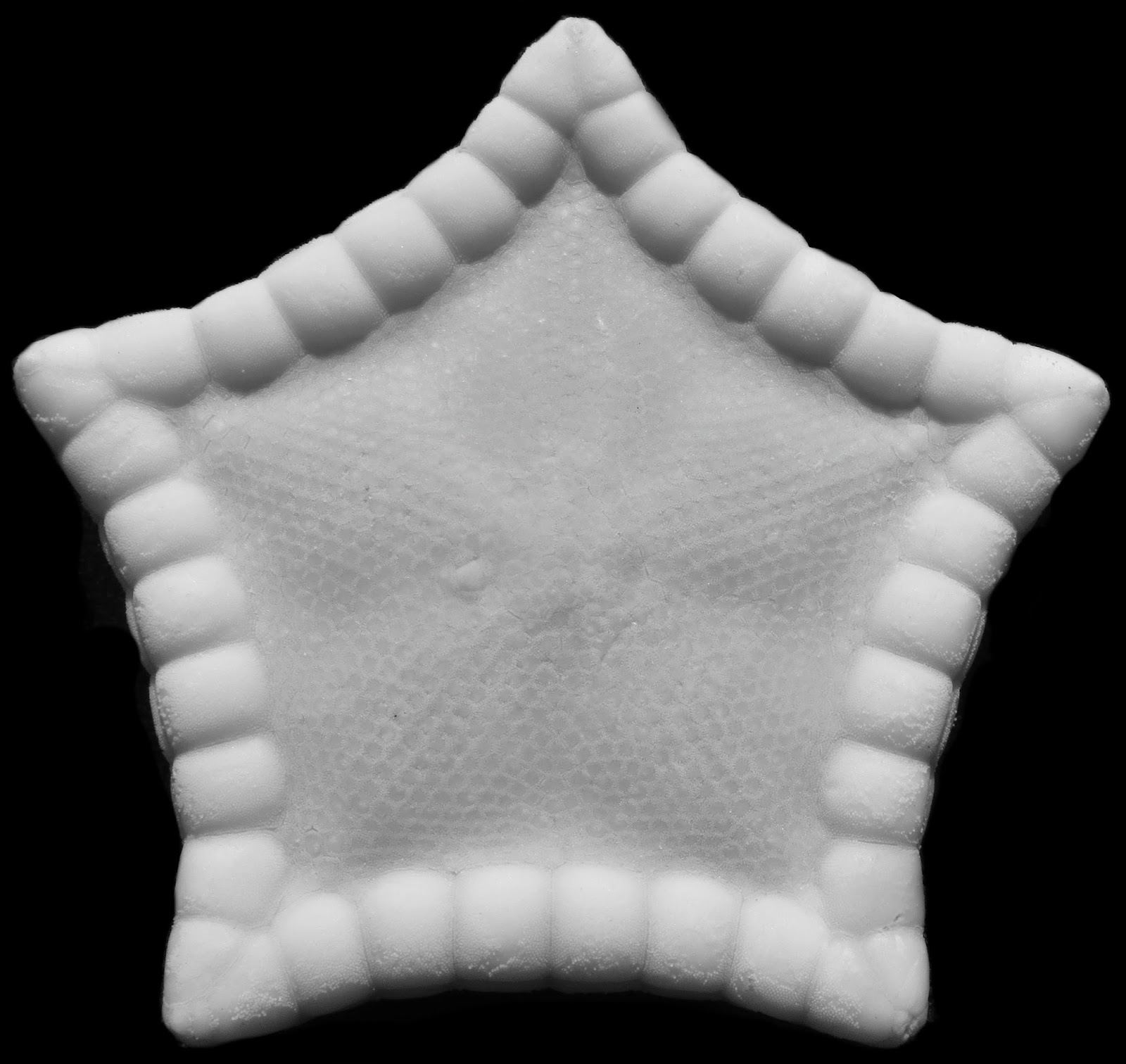
Apollonaster kelleyi

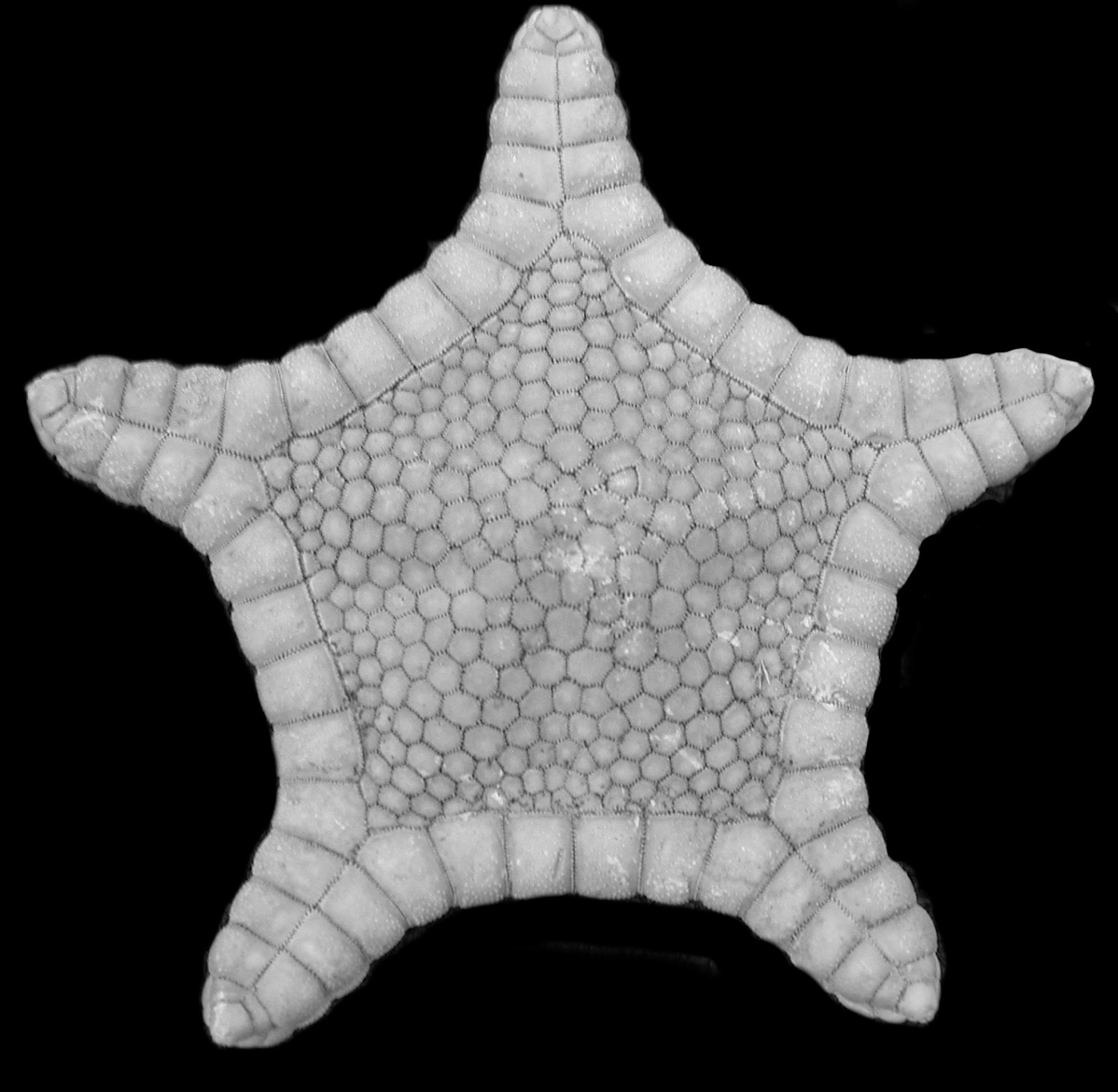
Astroceramus eldredgei

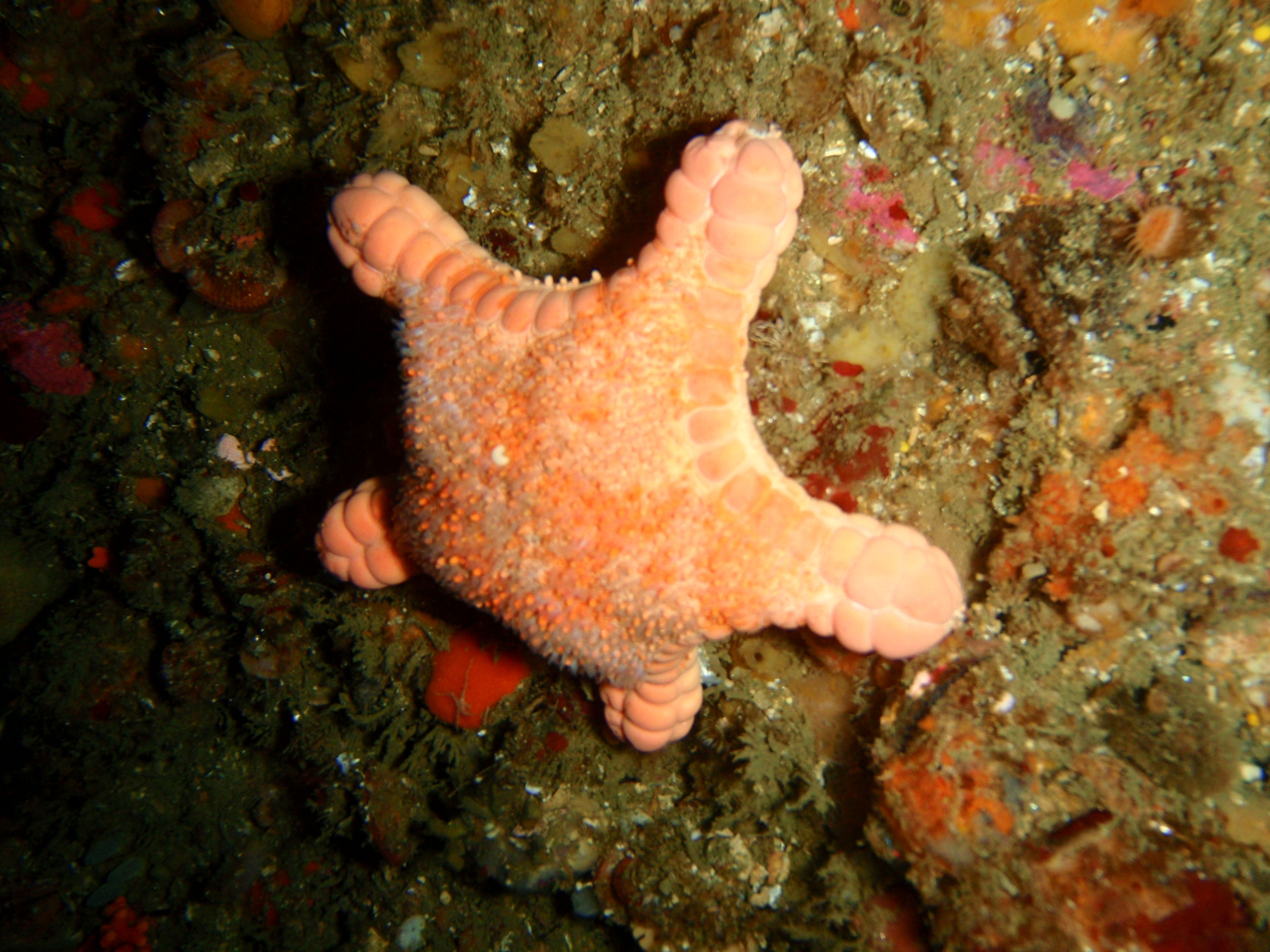
Calliaster baccatus

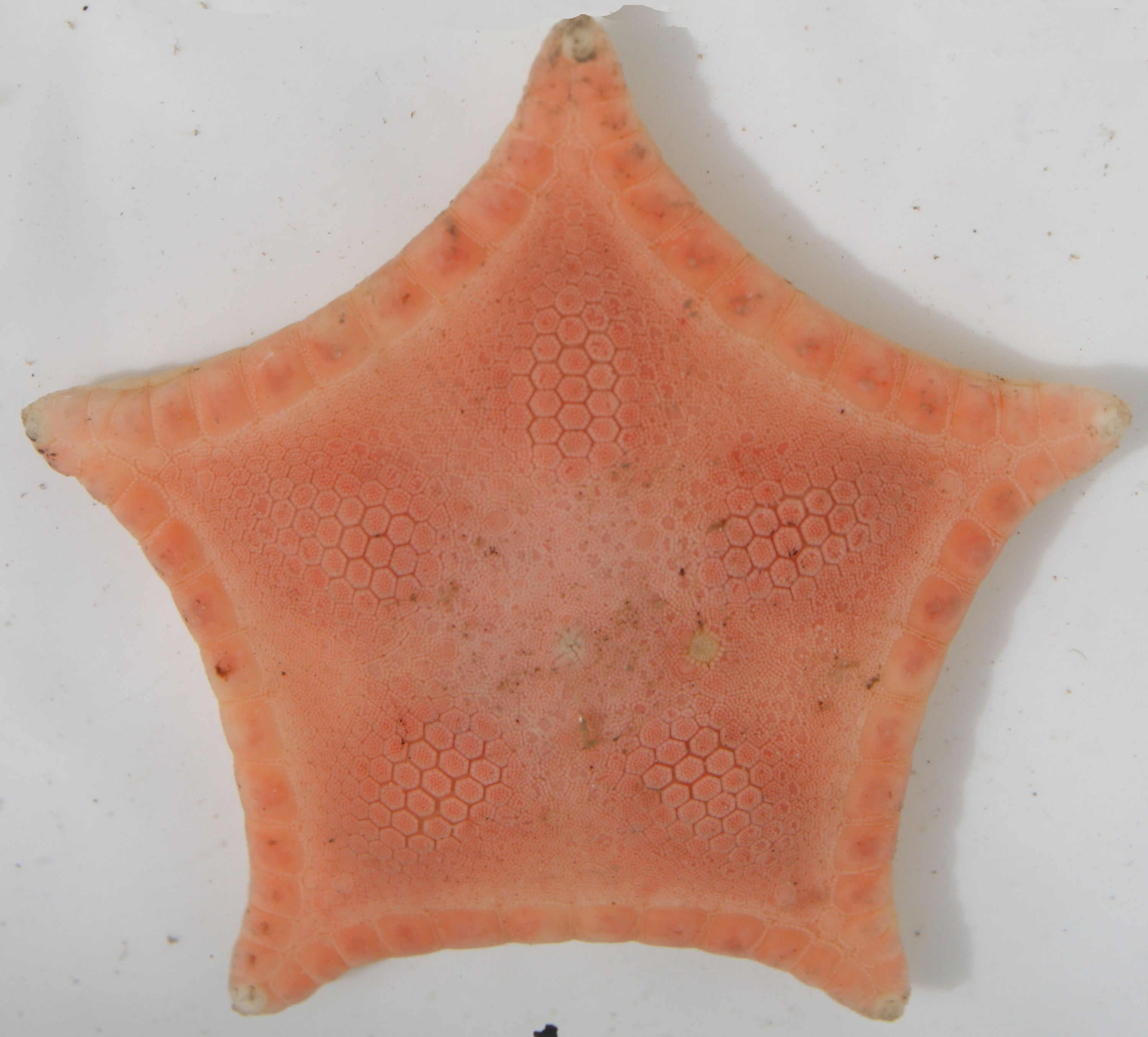
Ceramaster granularis

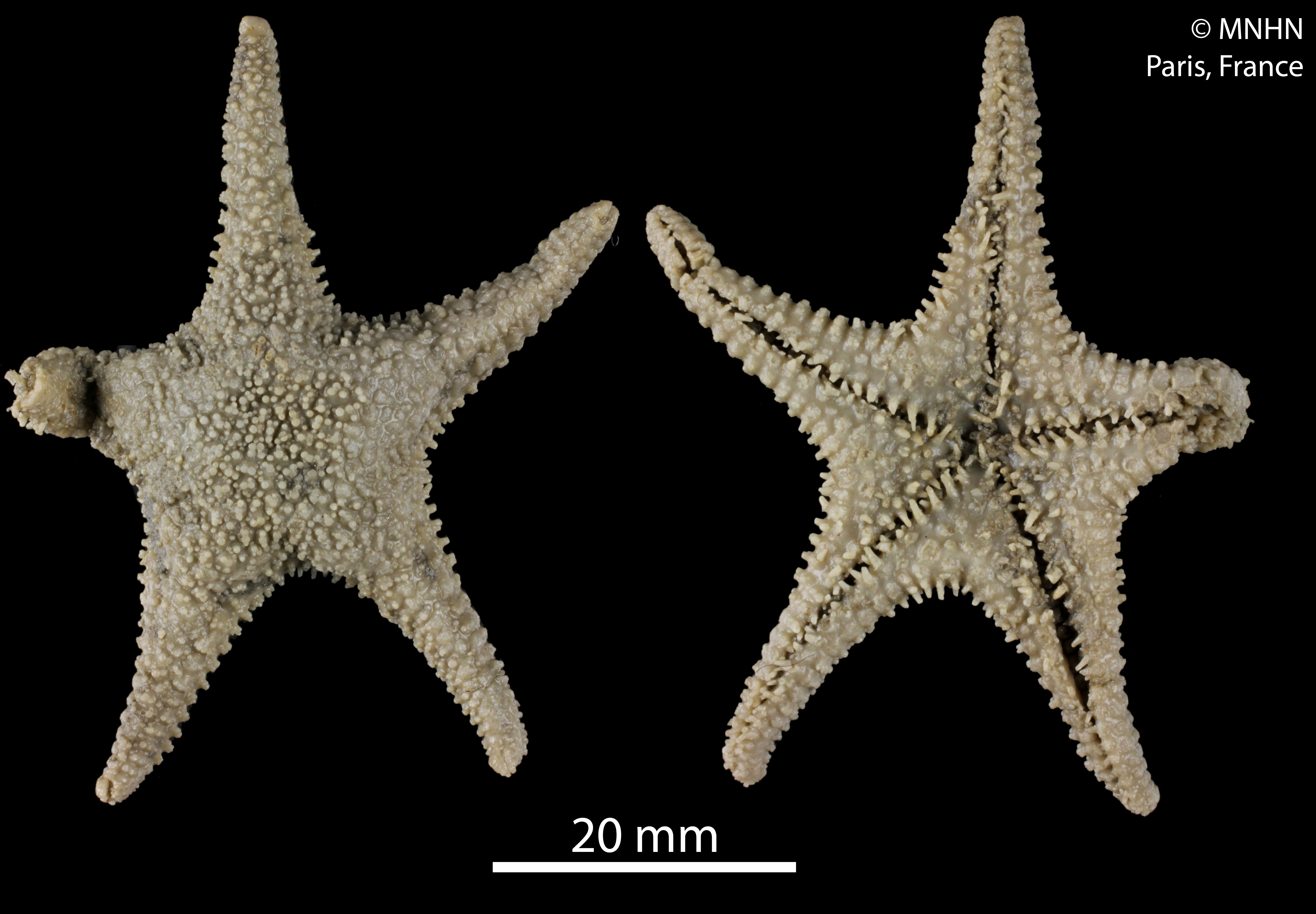
Chitonaster johannae

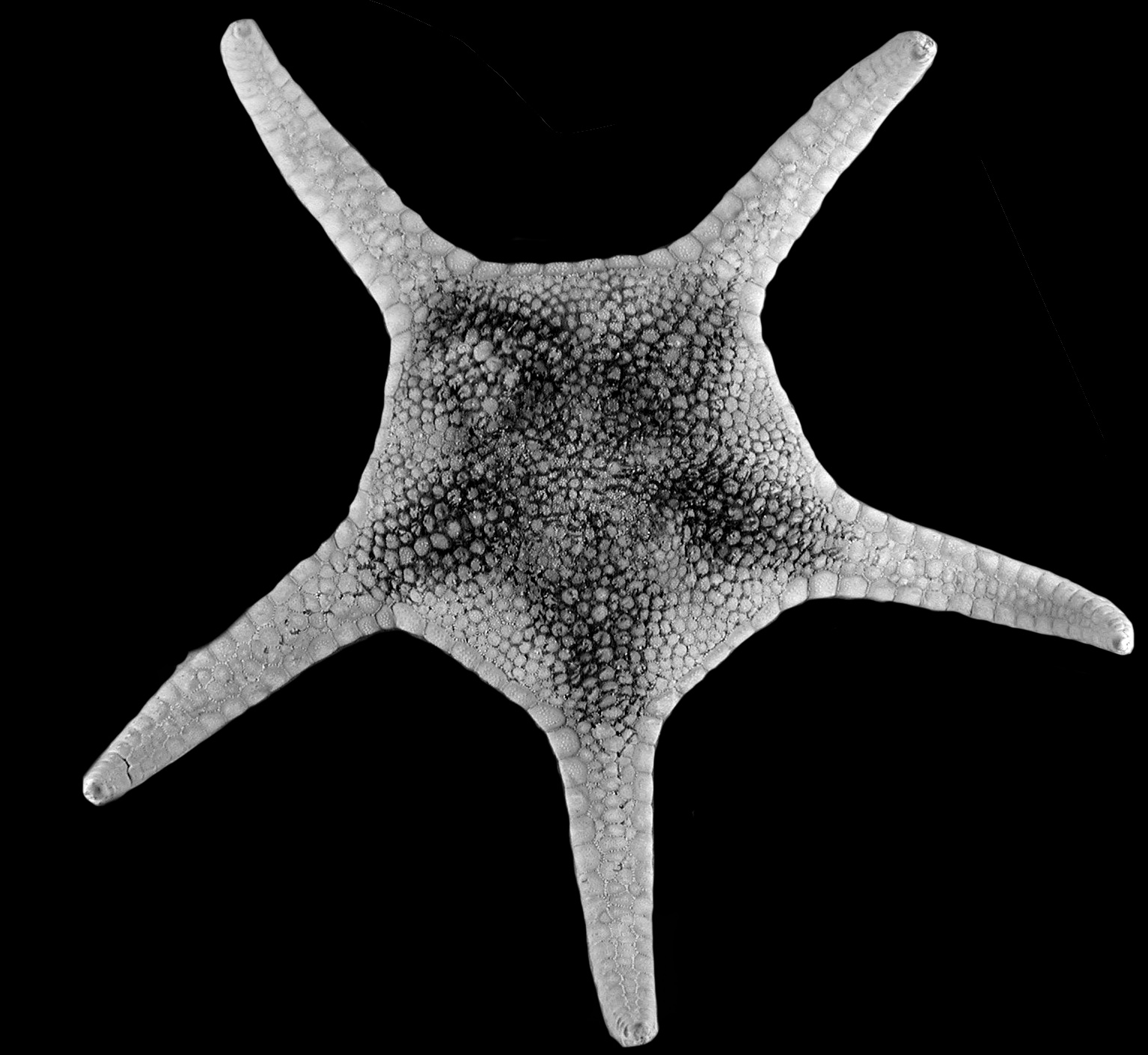
Circeaster sandrae

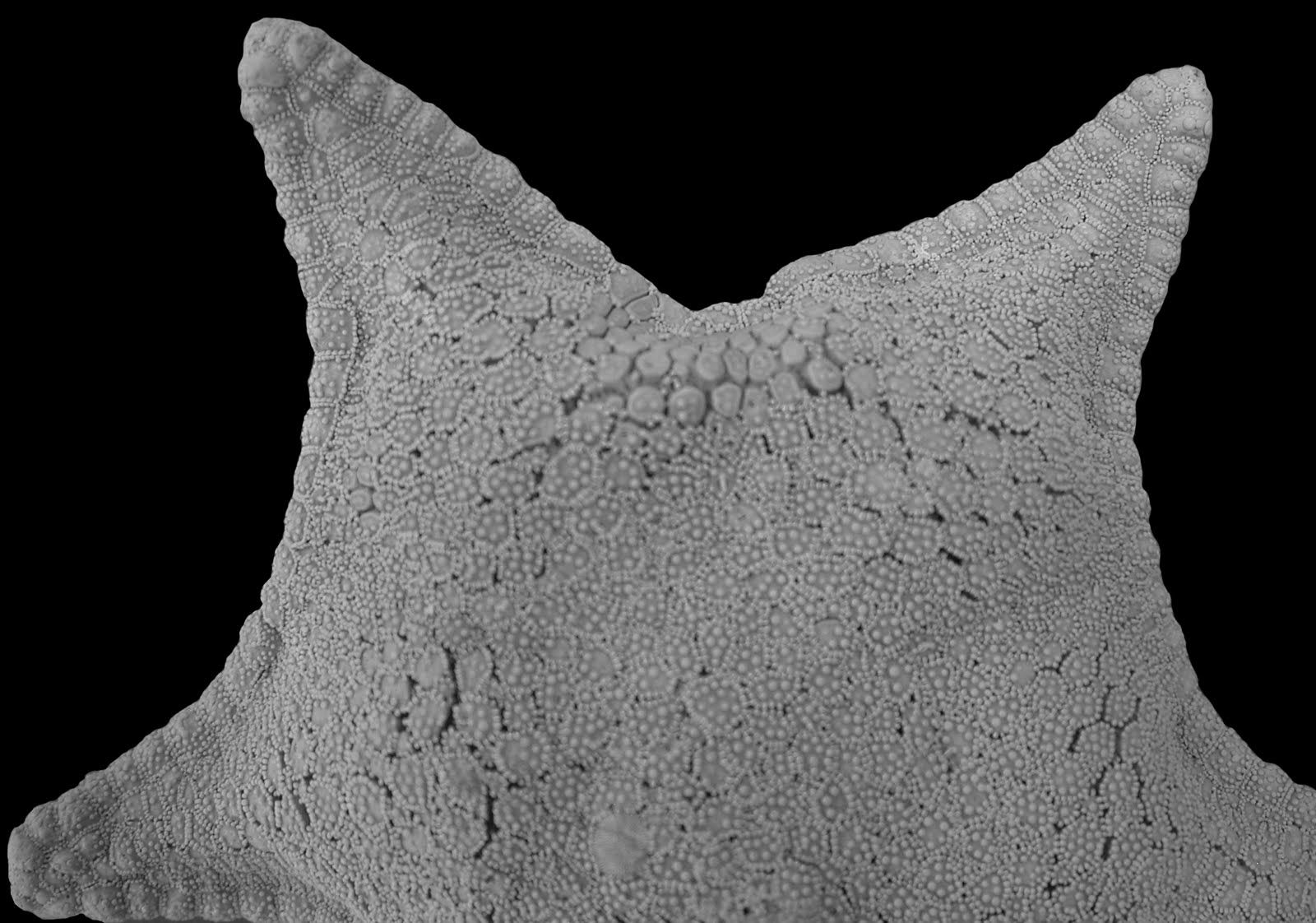
Cladaster analogus

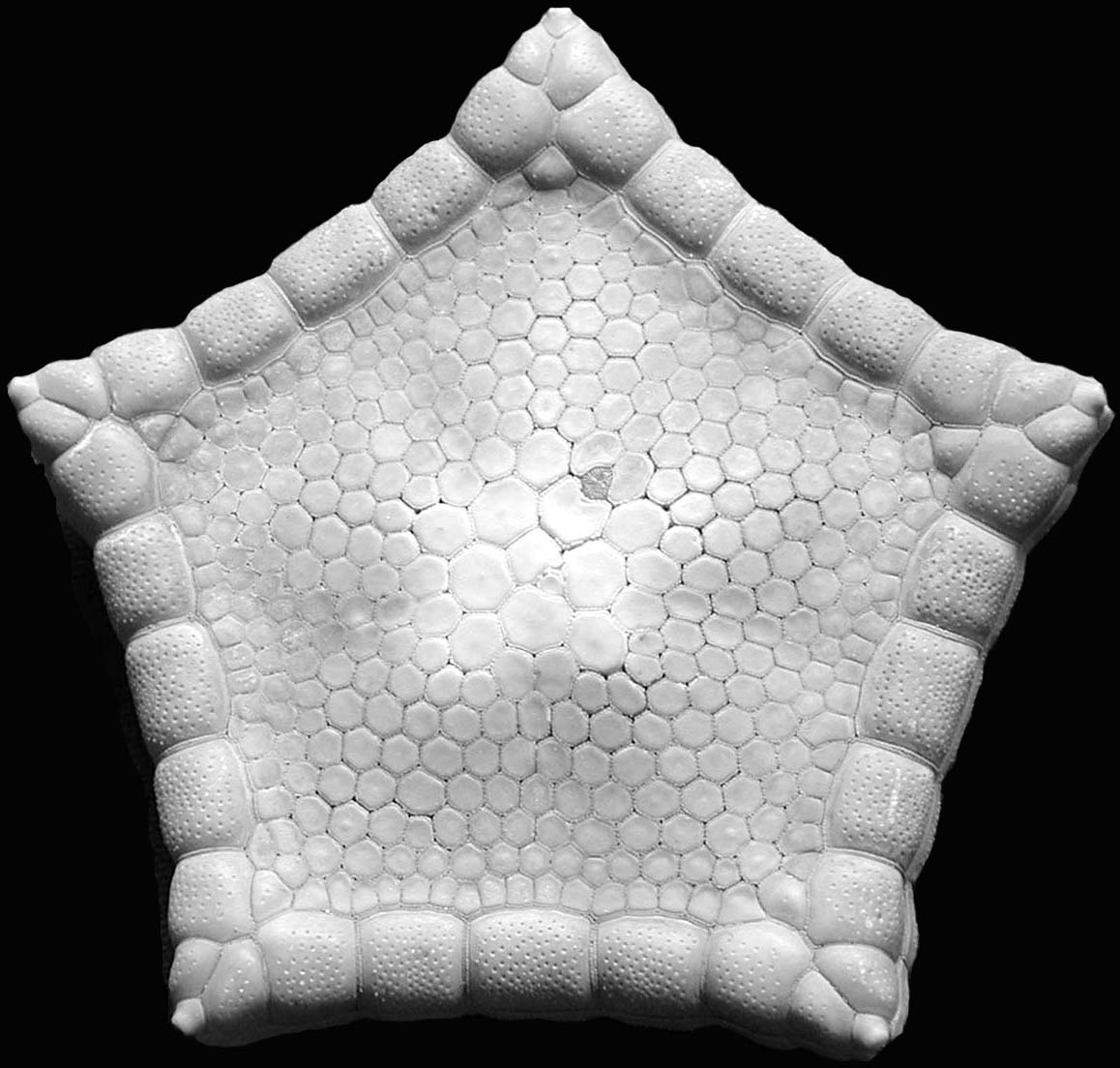
Eknomiaster beccae

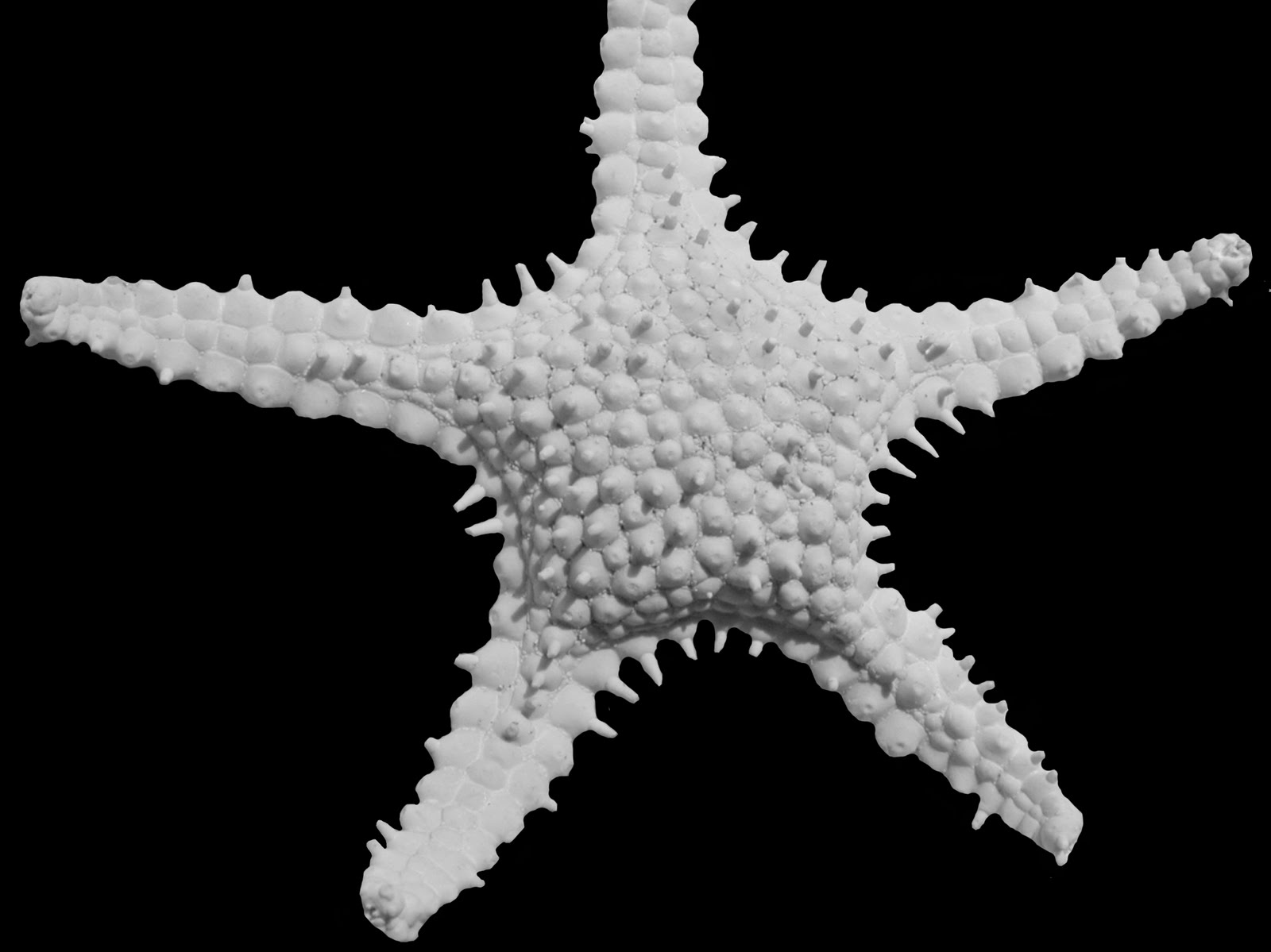
Eratosaster jennae

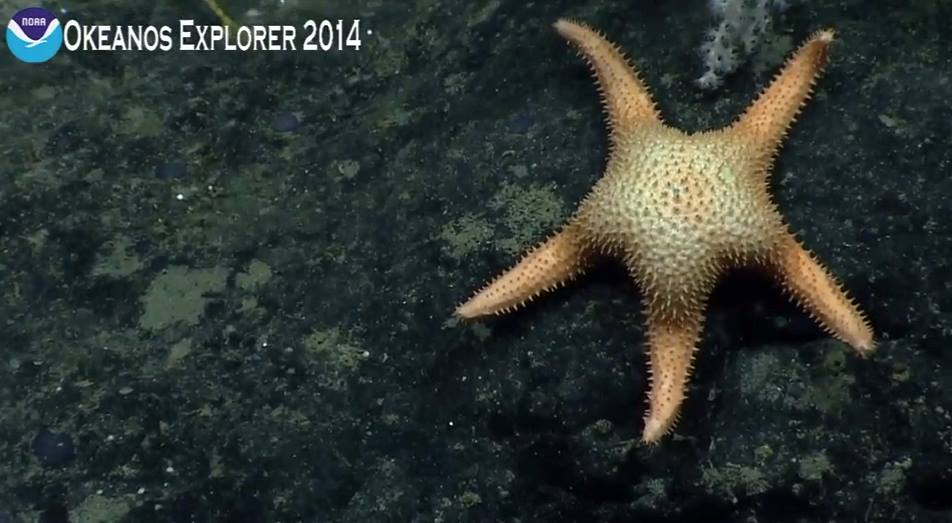
Evoplosoma sp.

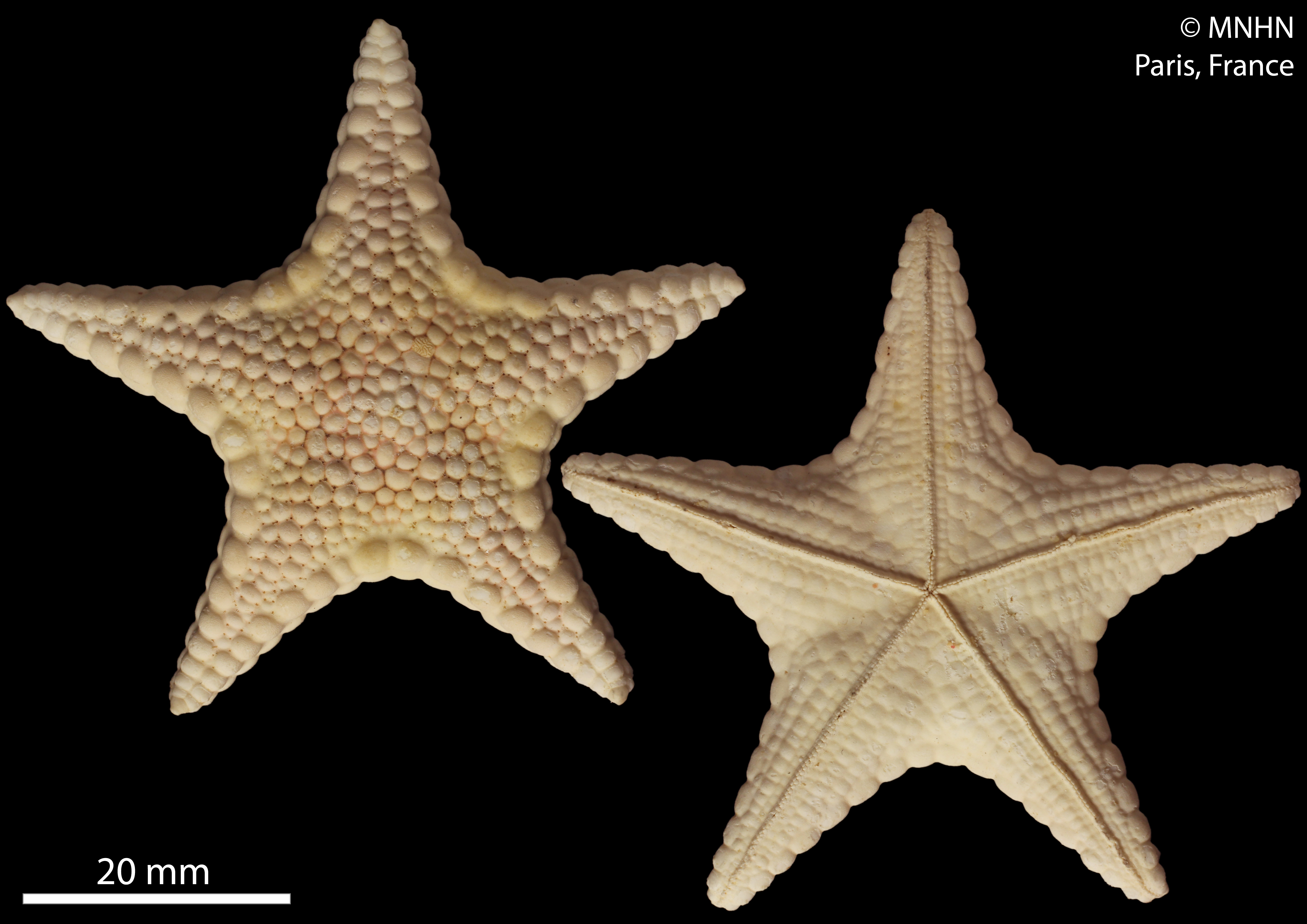
Eosaster nadiae

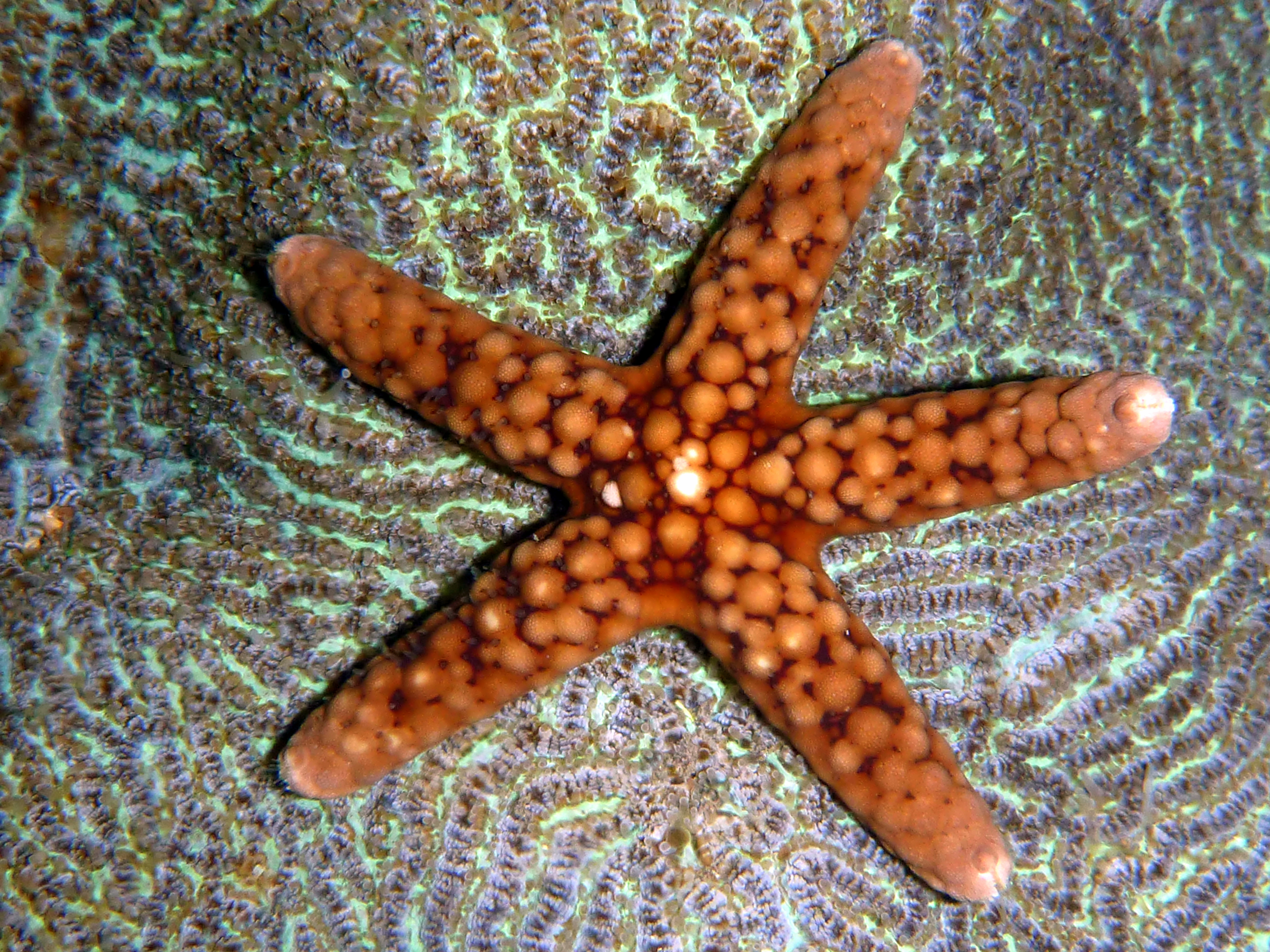
Ferdina flavescens

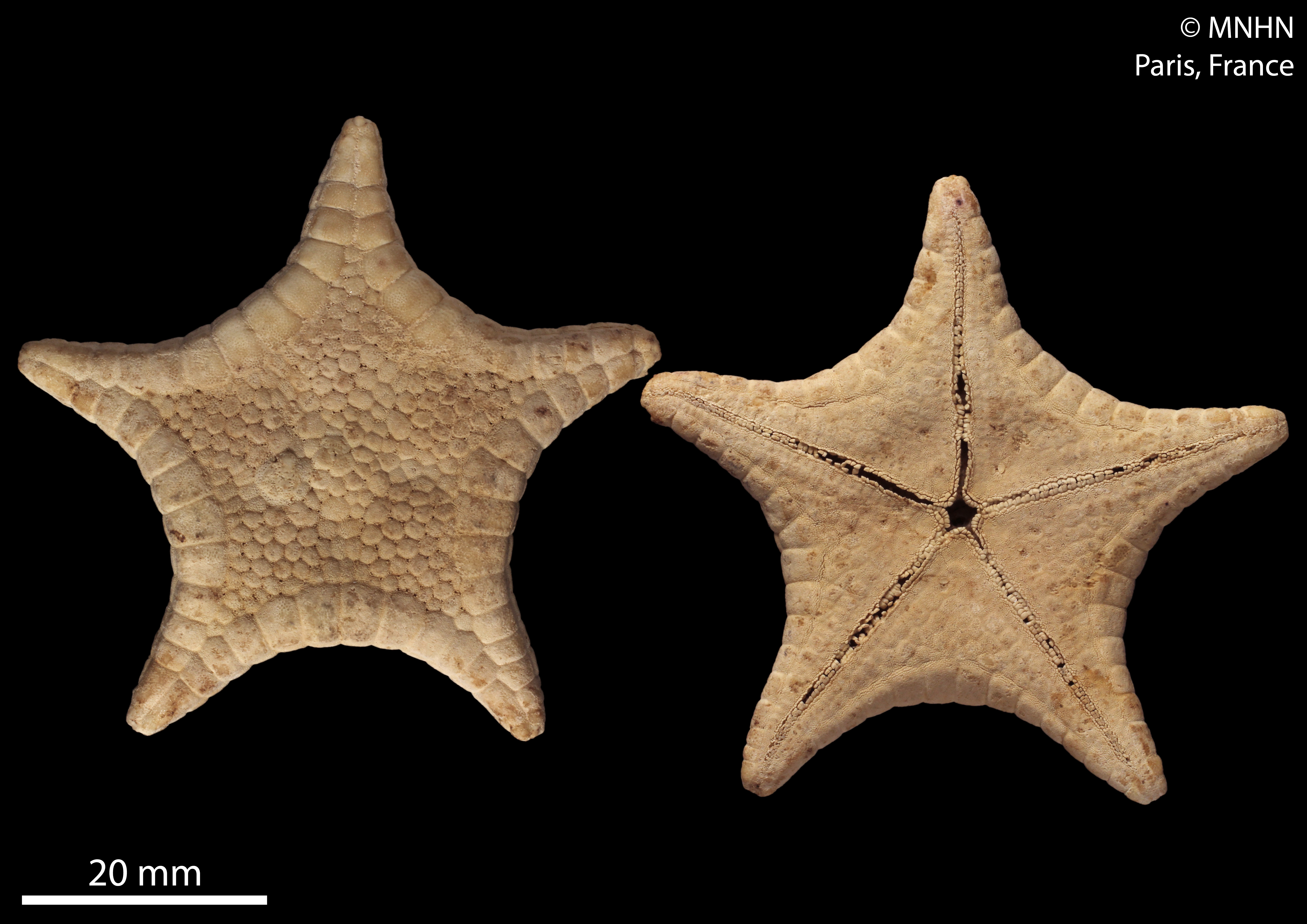
Kanakaster solidus

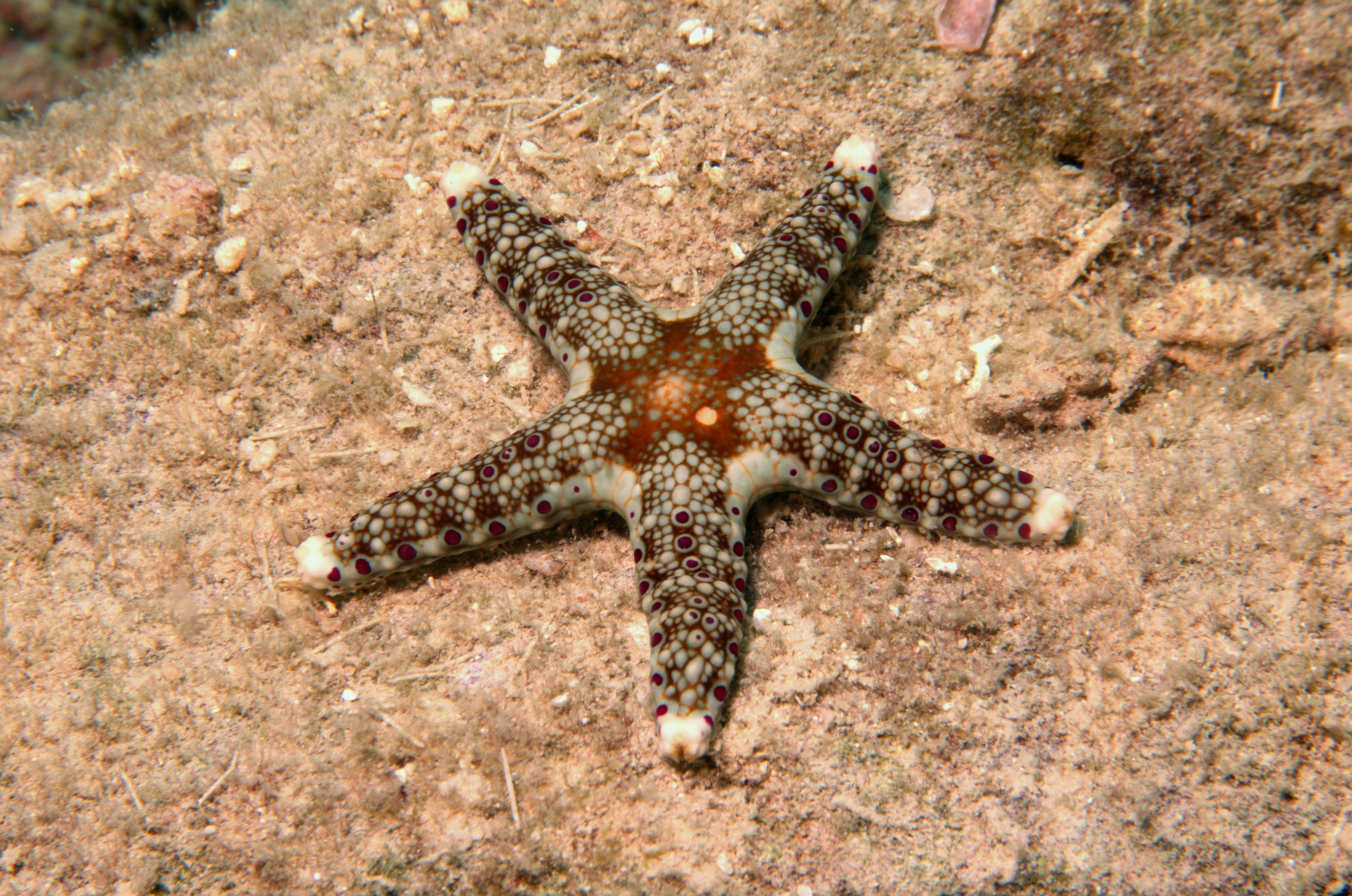
Neoferdina cumingi

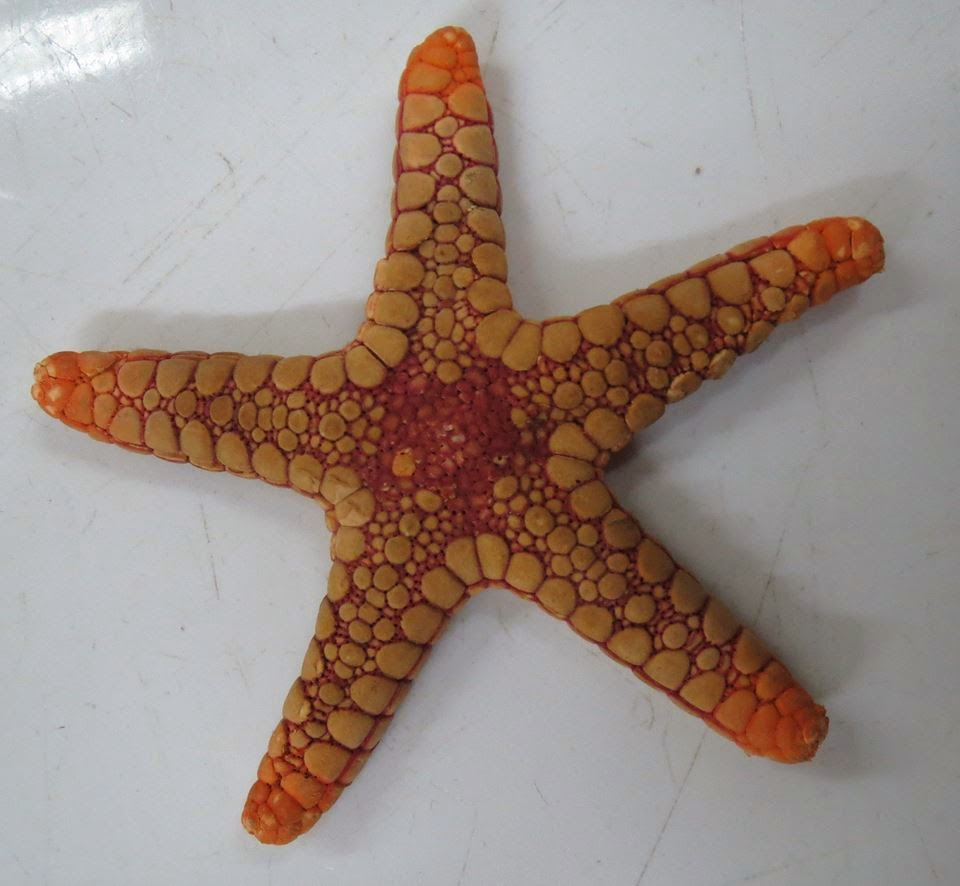
Paraferdina plakos

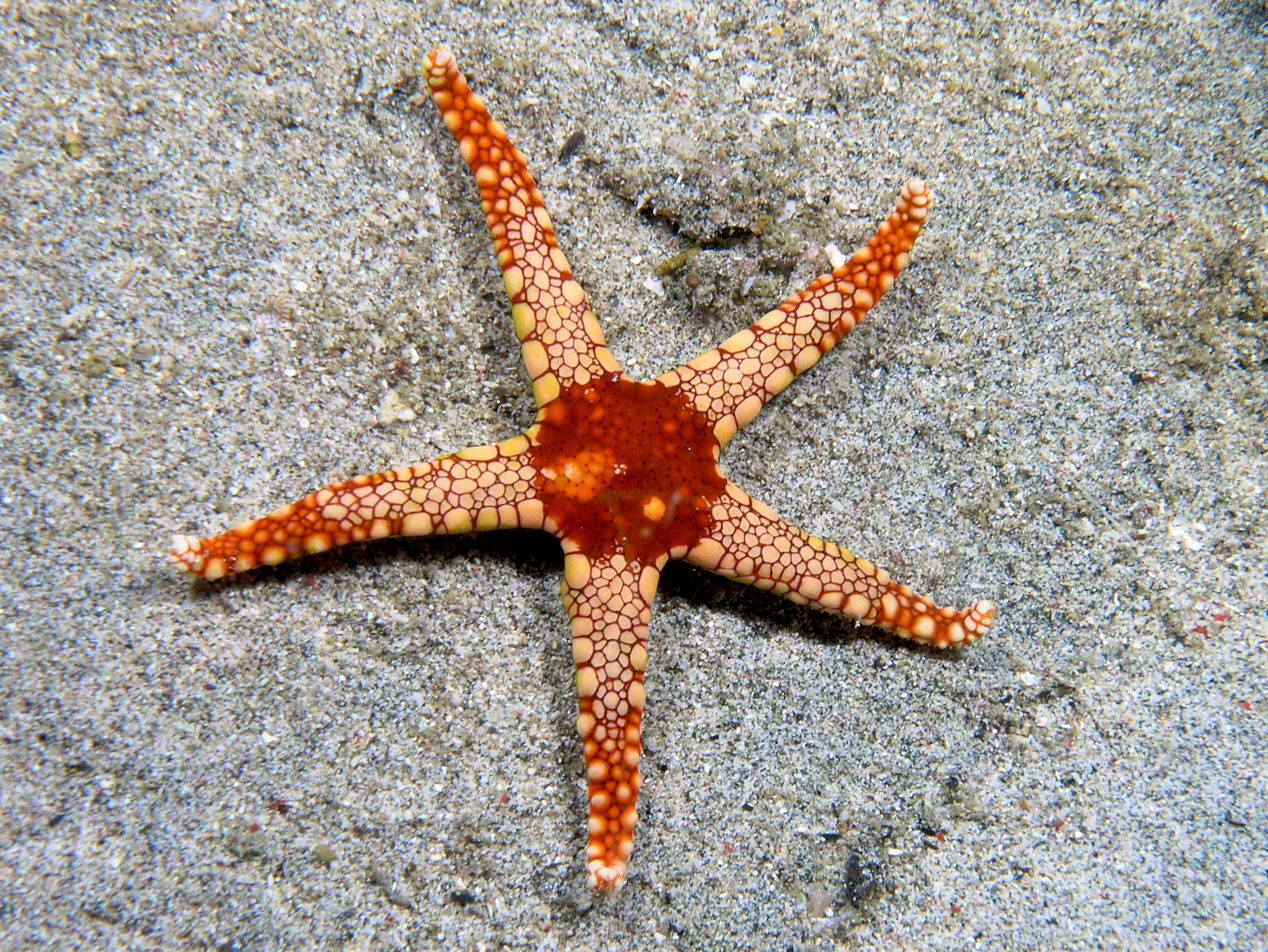
Fromia monilis

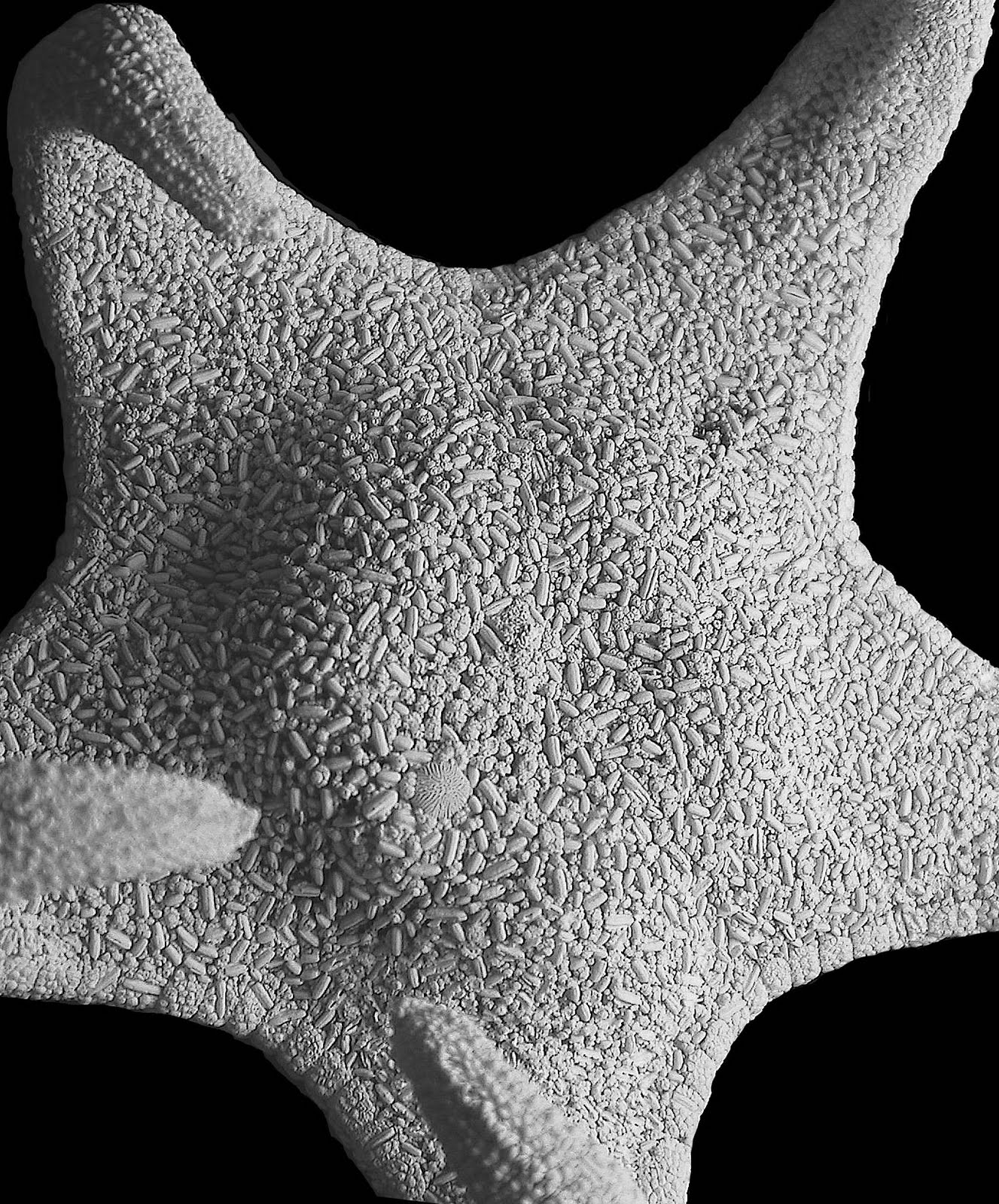
Gilbertaster caribaea

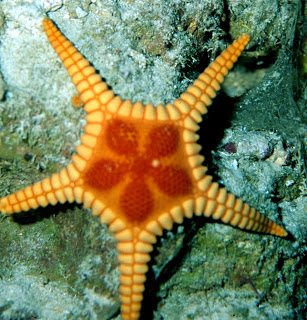
Glyphodiscus magnificus

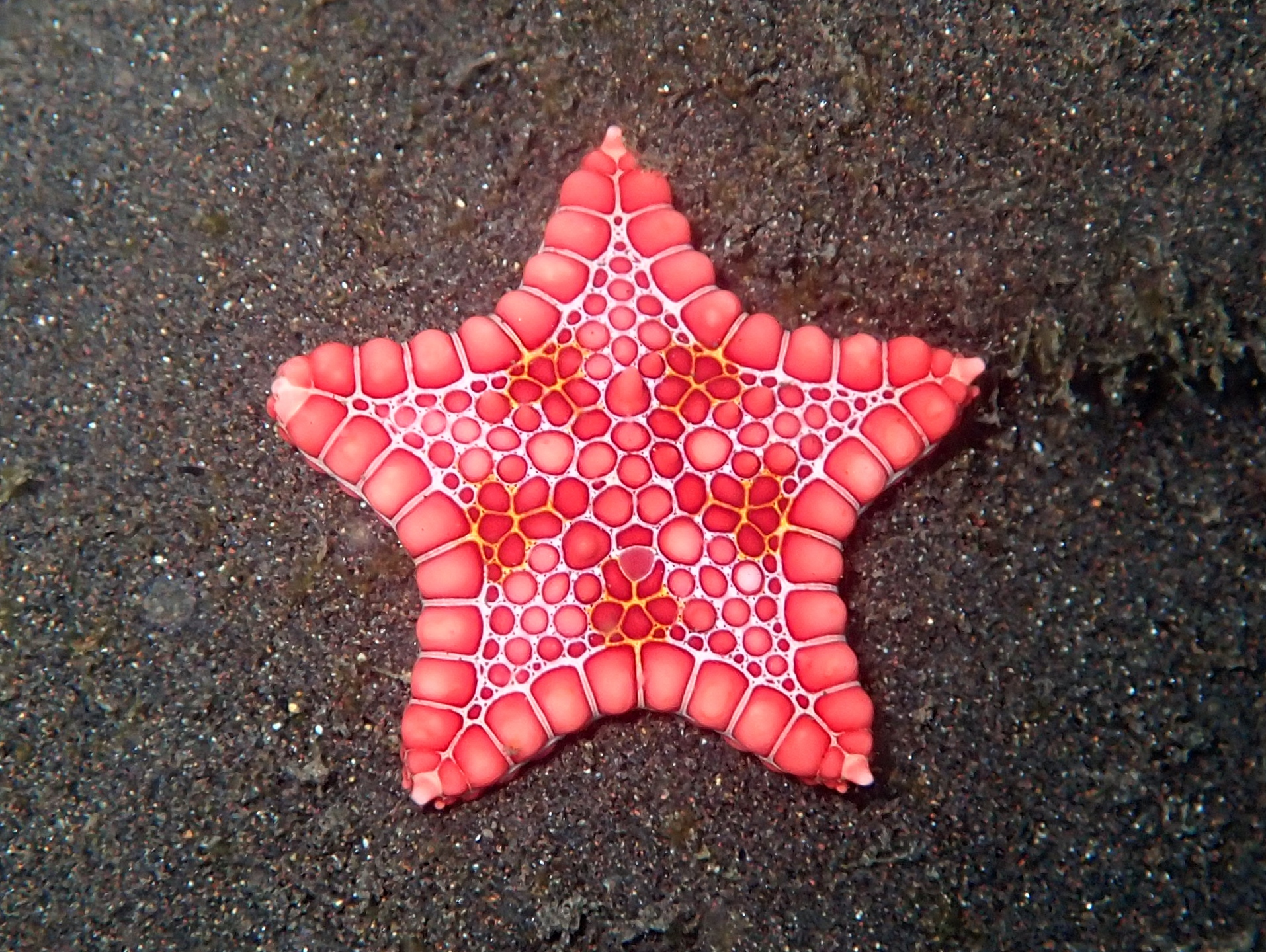
Goniaster tessellatus

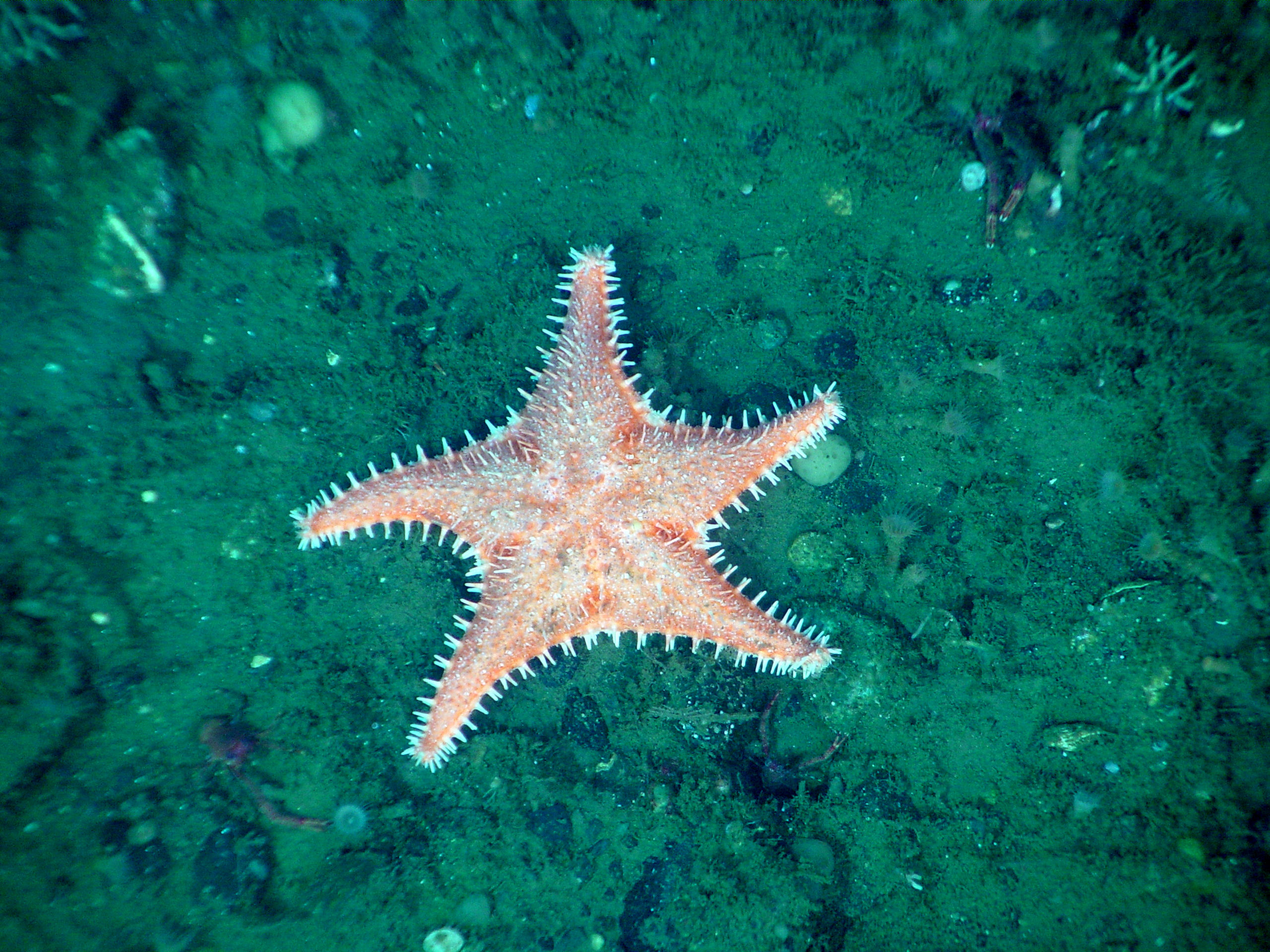
Hippasteria spinosa

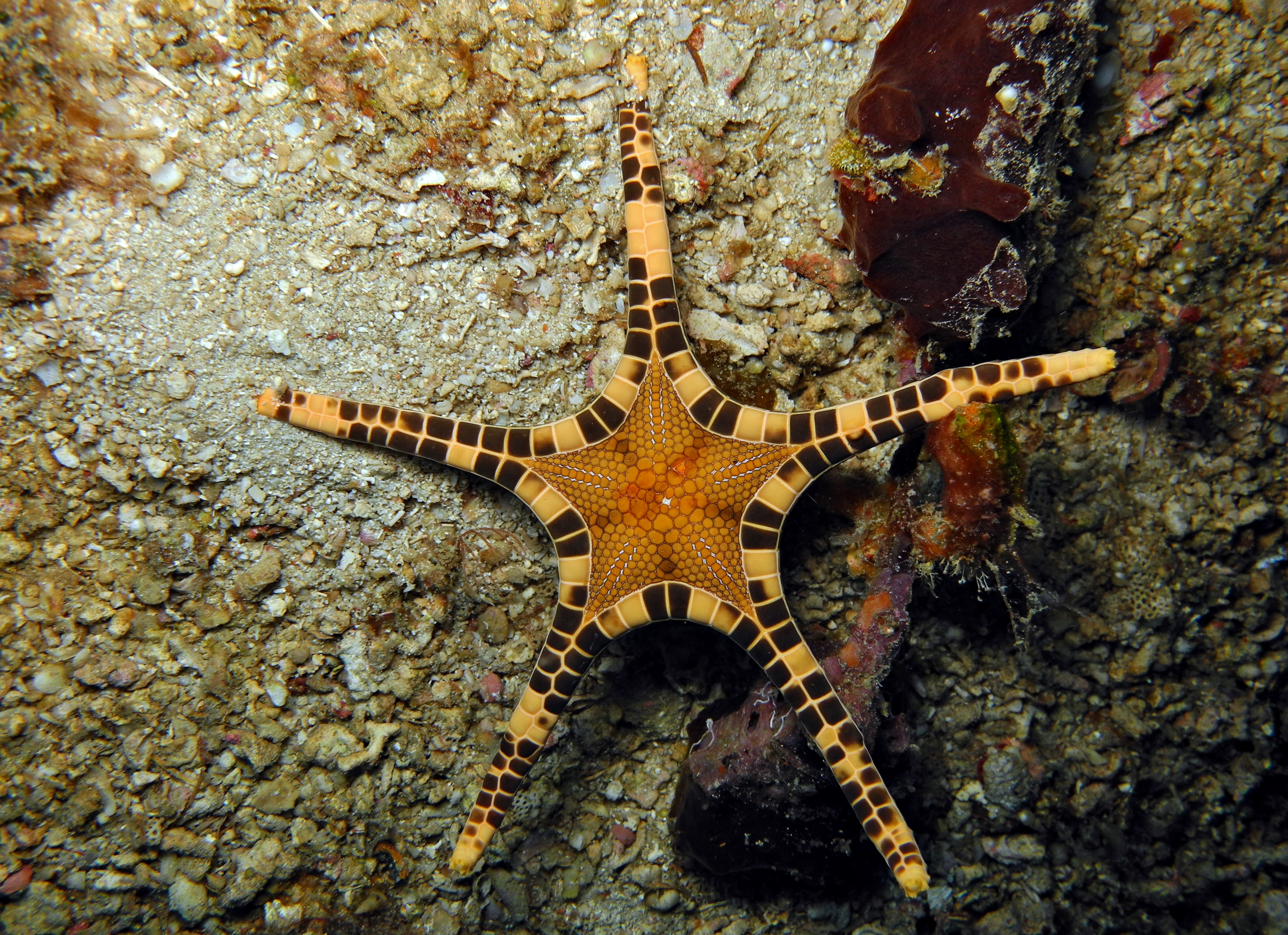
Iconaster longimanus

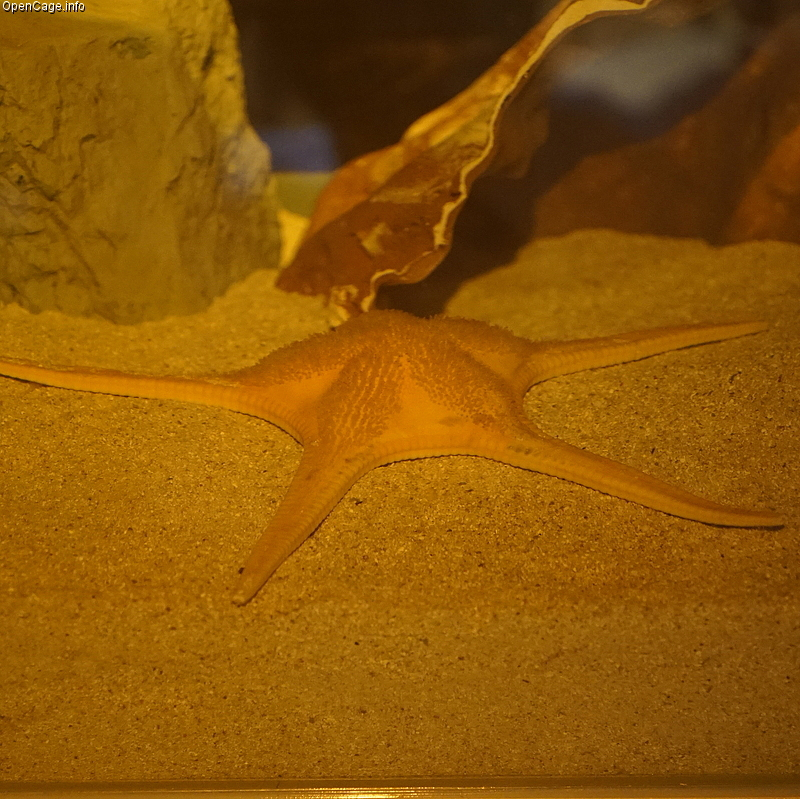
`Mariaster giganteus

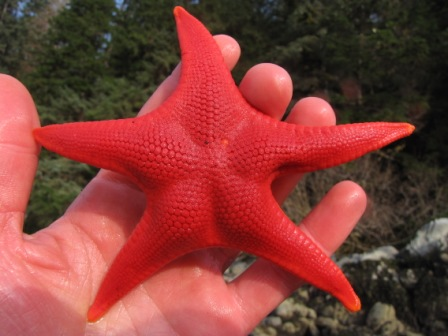
Mediaster aequalis

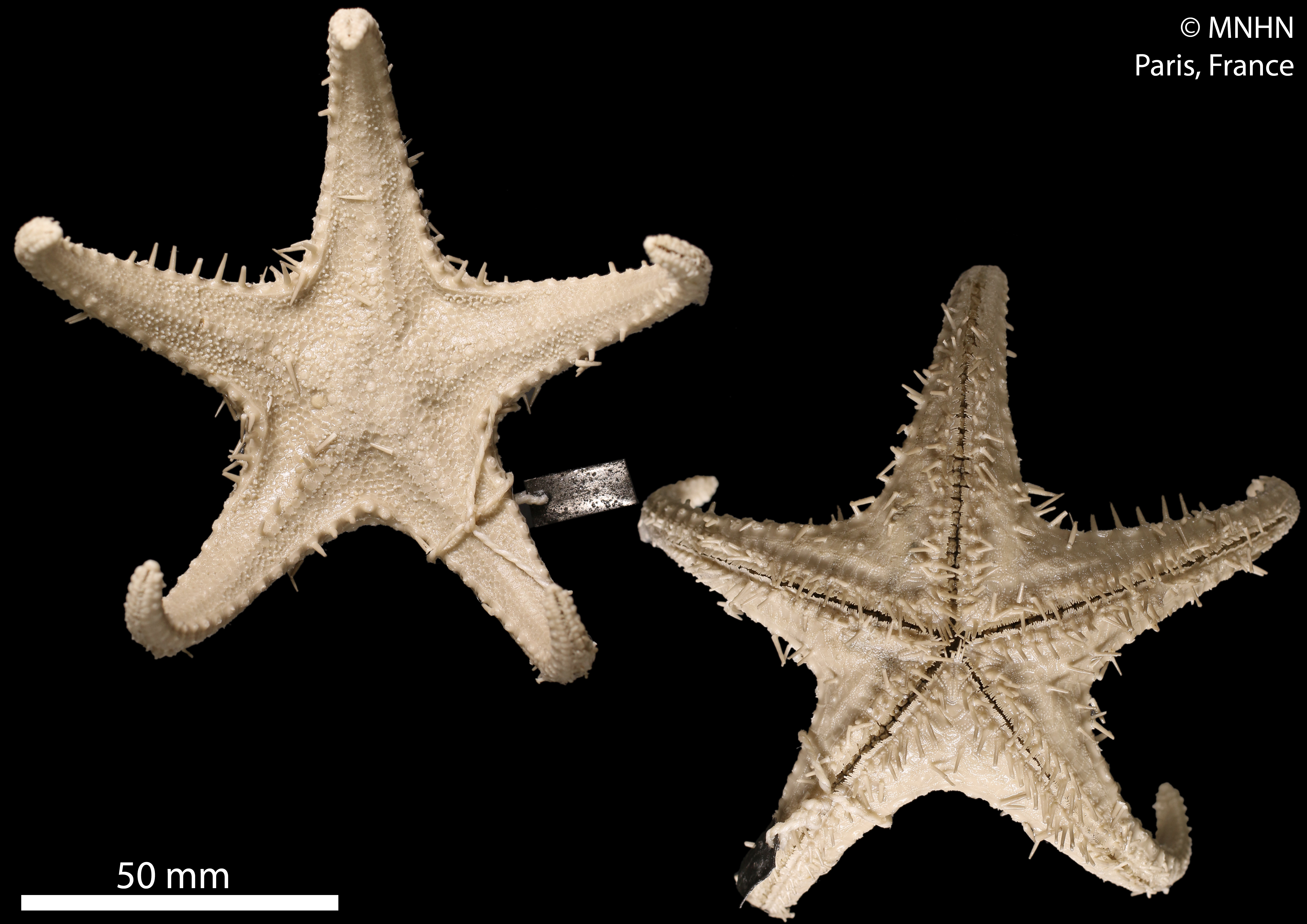
Milteliphaster woodmasoni

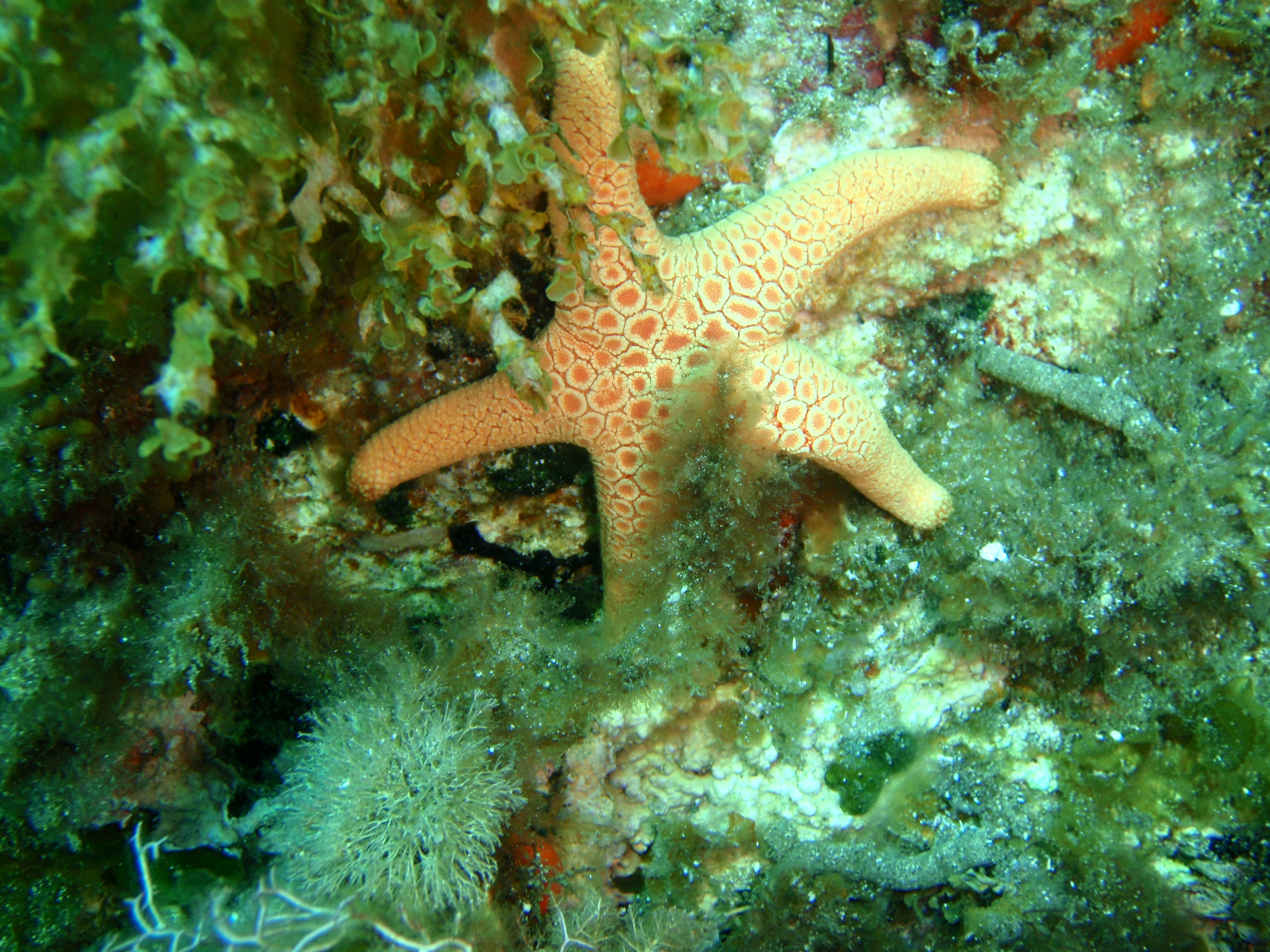
Nectria macrobrachia

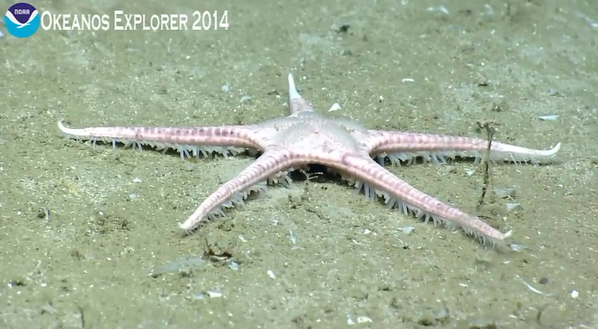
Nymphaster arenatus

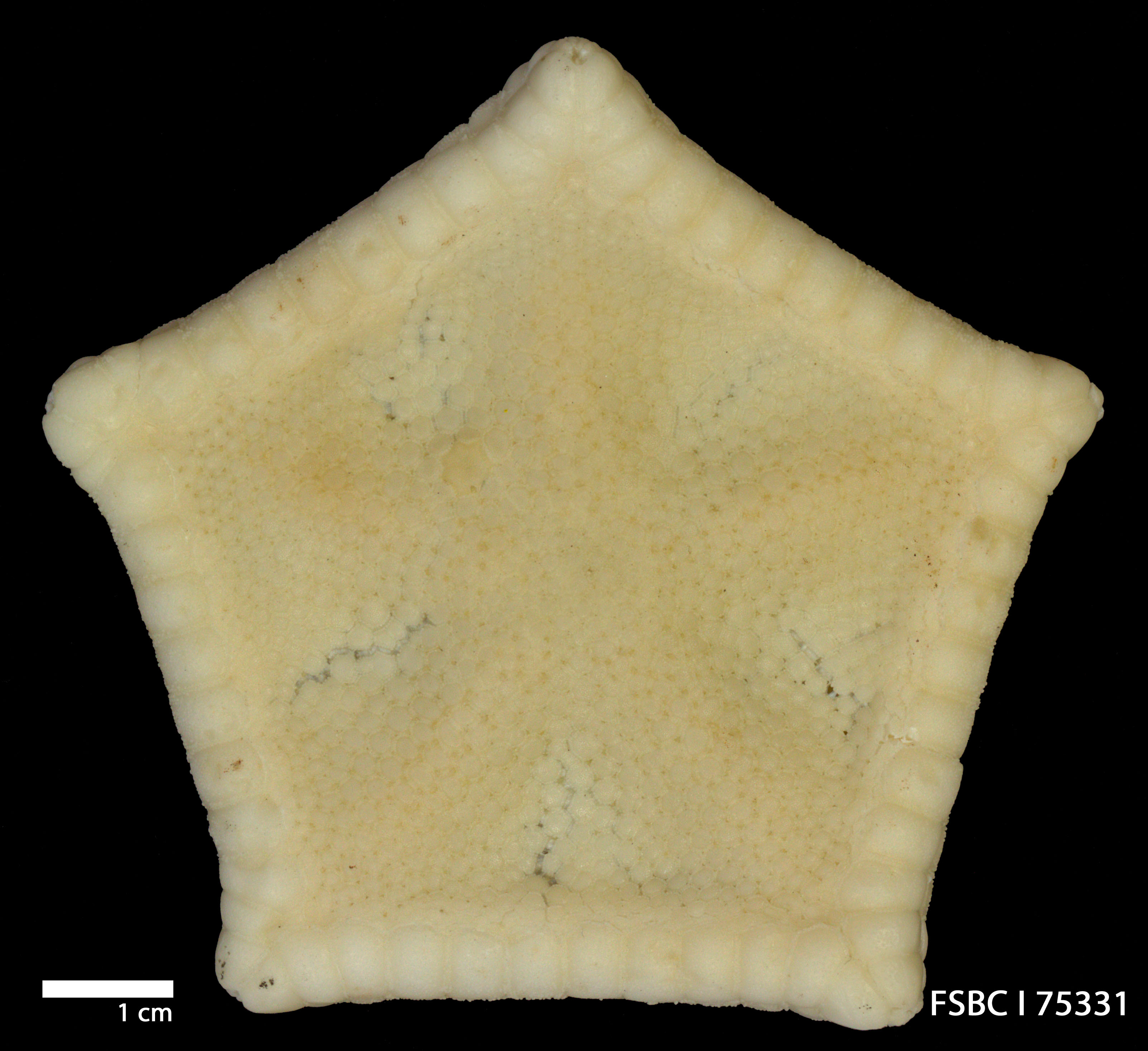
Peltaster placenta

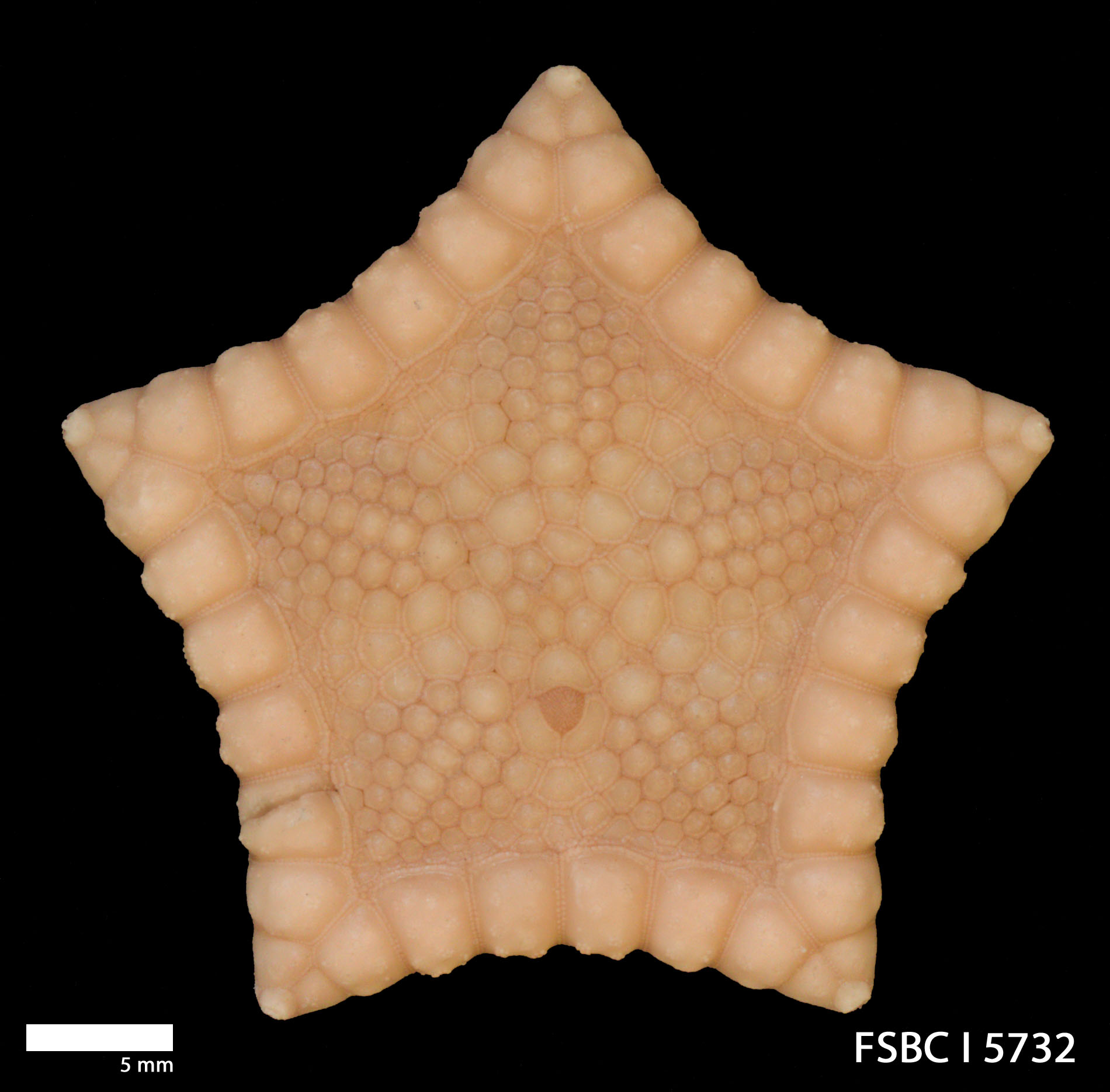
Pawsonaster parvus

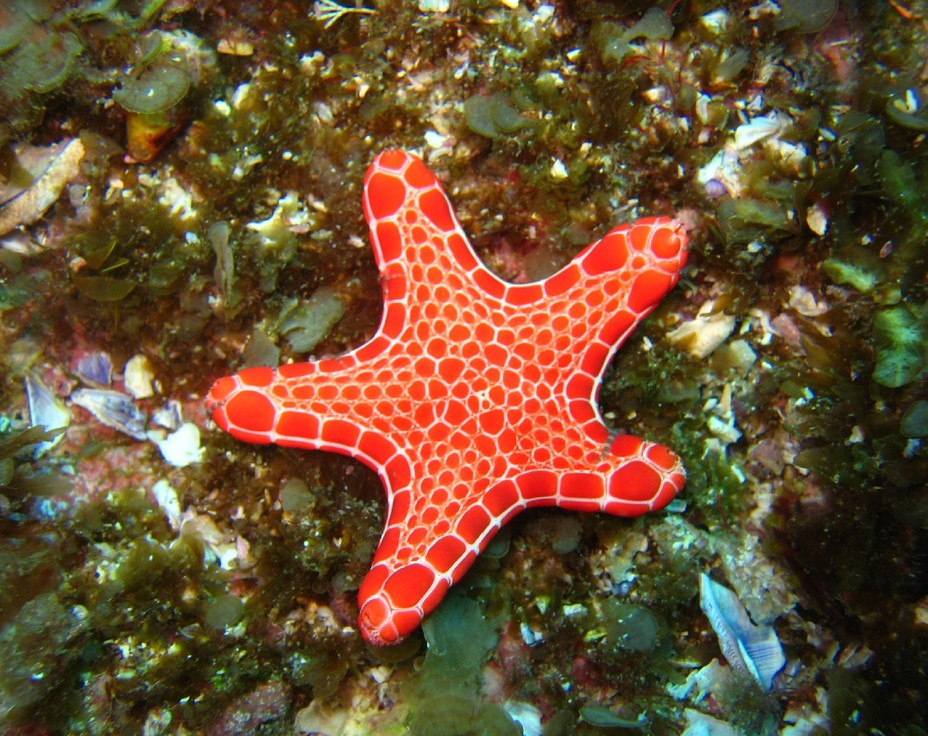
Pentagonaster duebeni

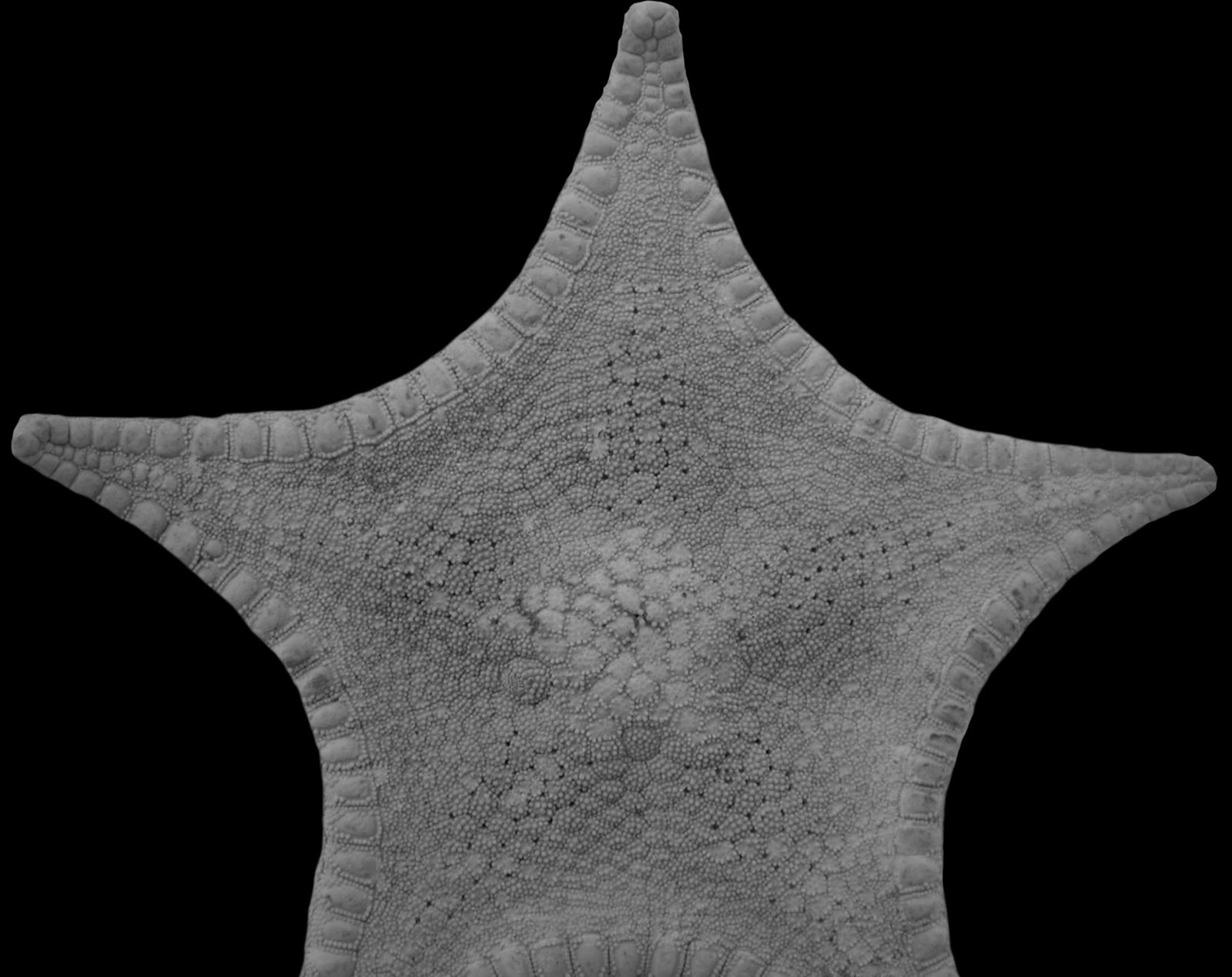
Pillsburiaster calvus

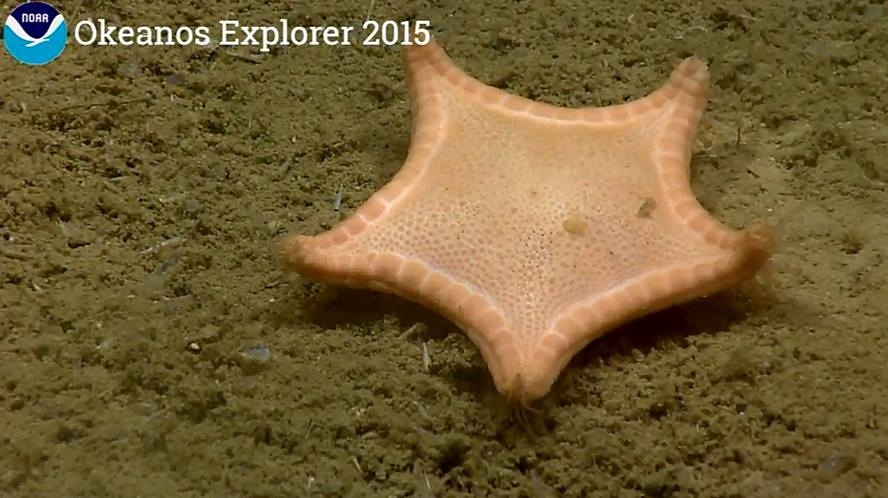
Plinthaster dentatus

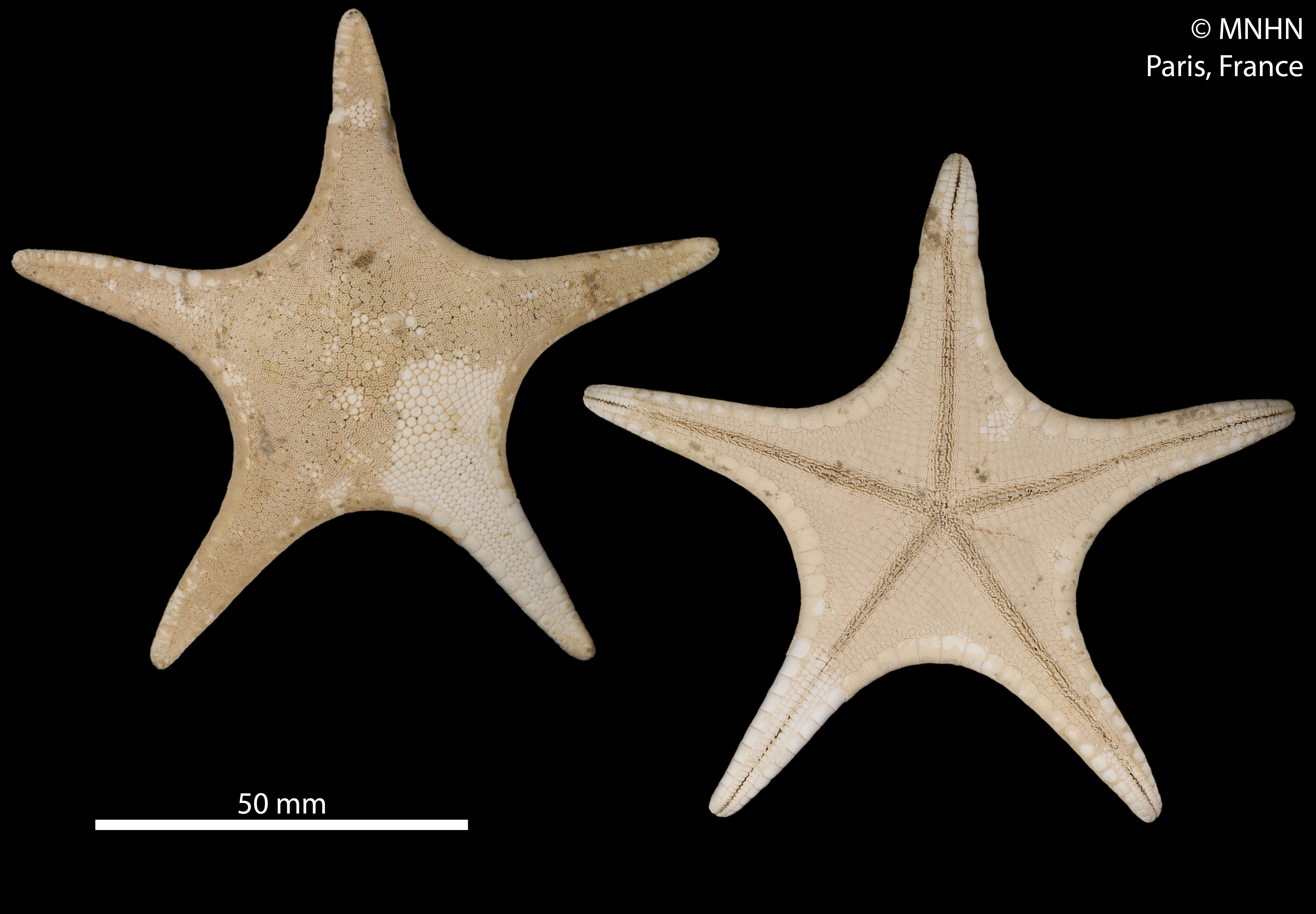
Pseudoceramaster regularis

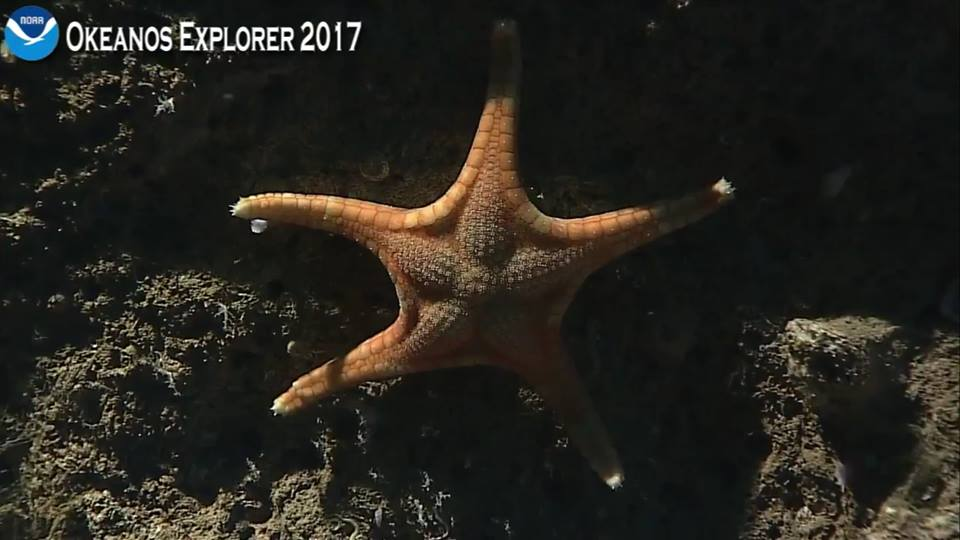
Rosaster sp.

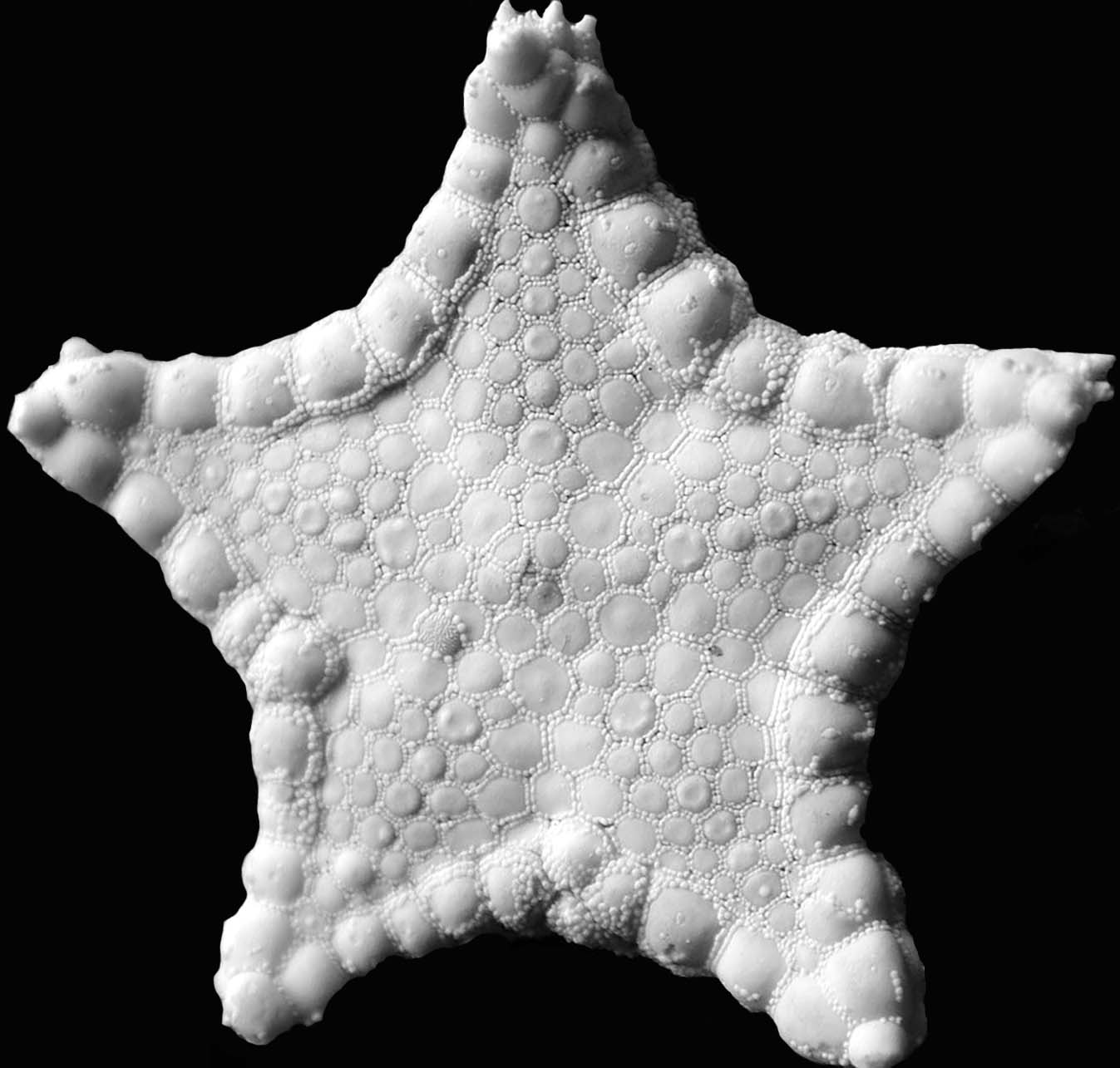
Ryukuaster onnae

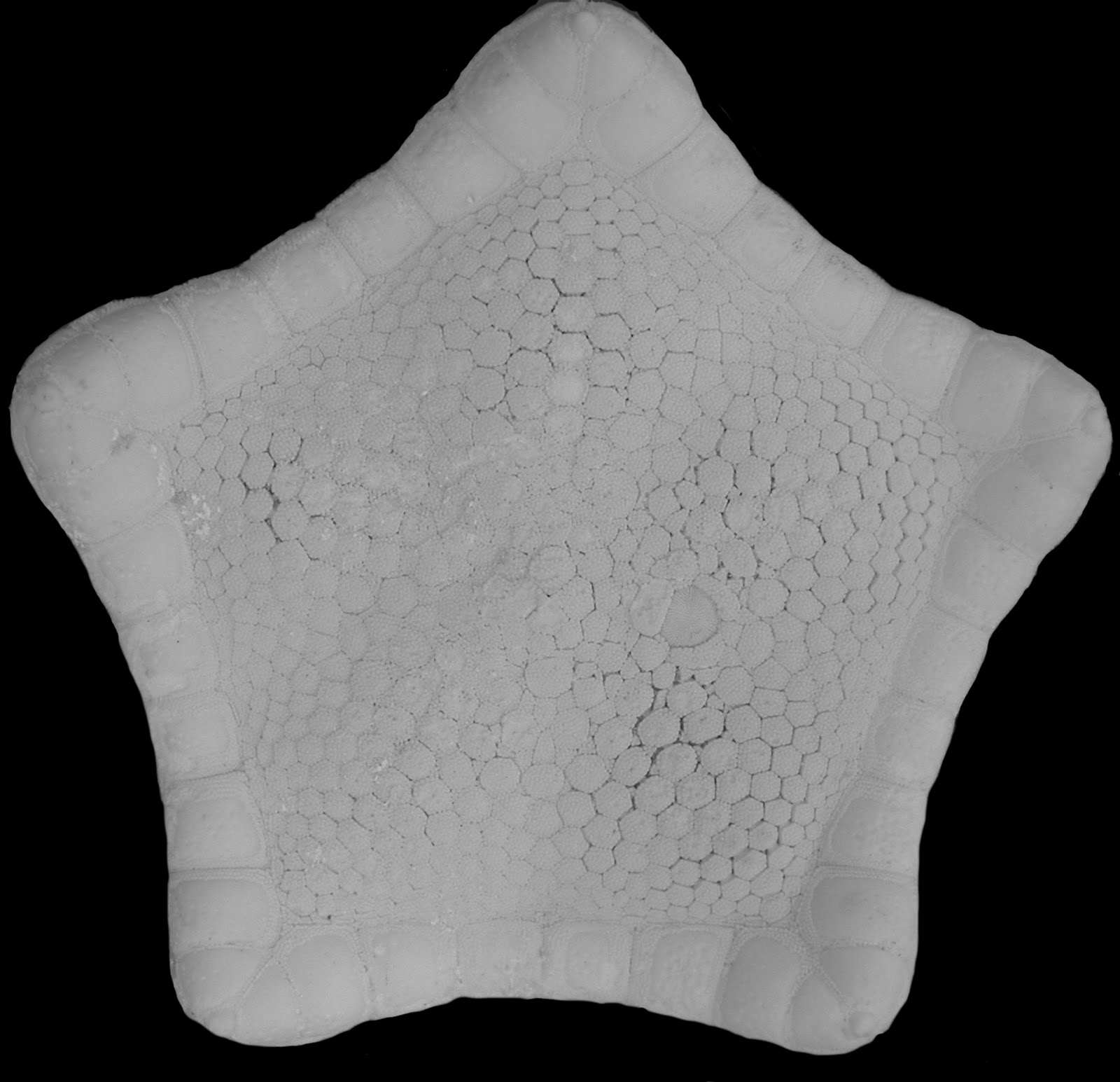
Sphaeriodiscus mirabilis

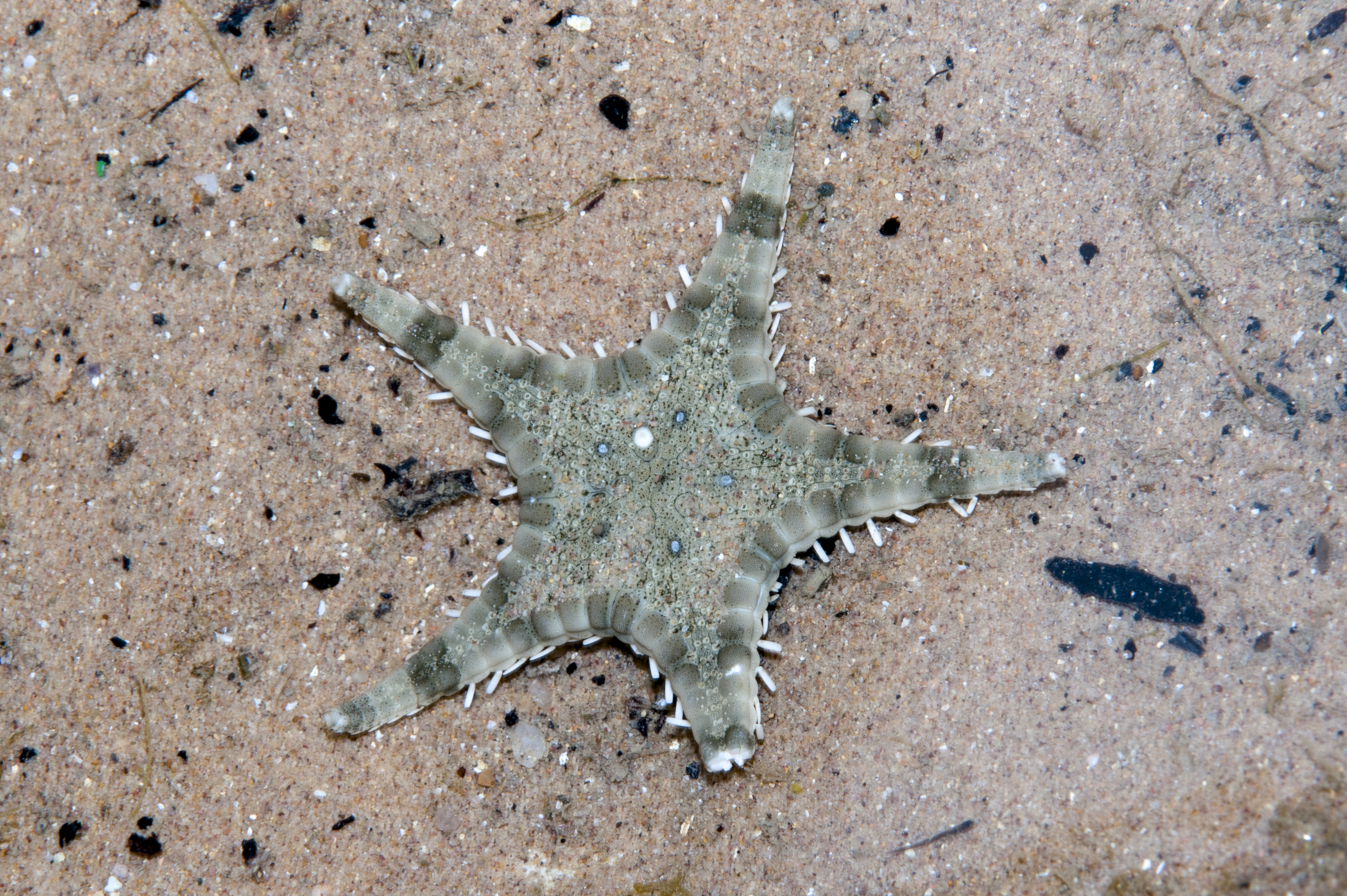
Stellaster childreni

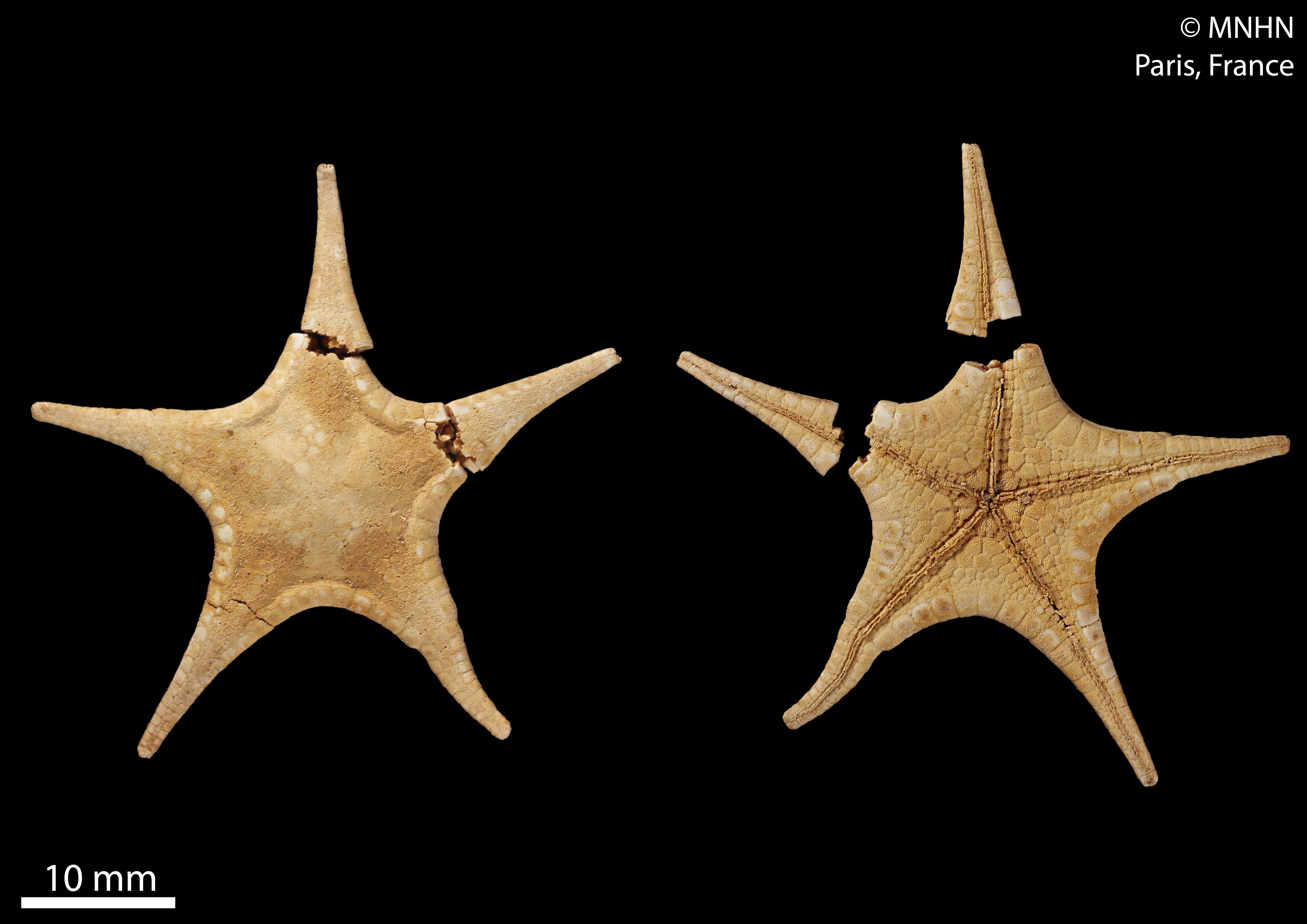
Stellasteropsis fouadi

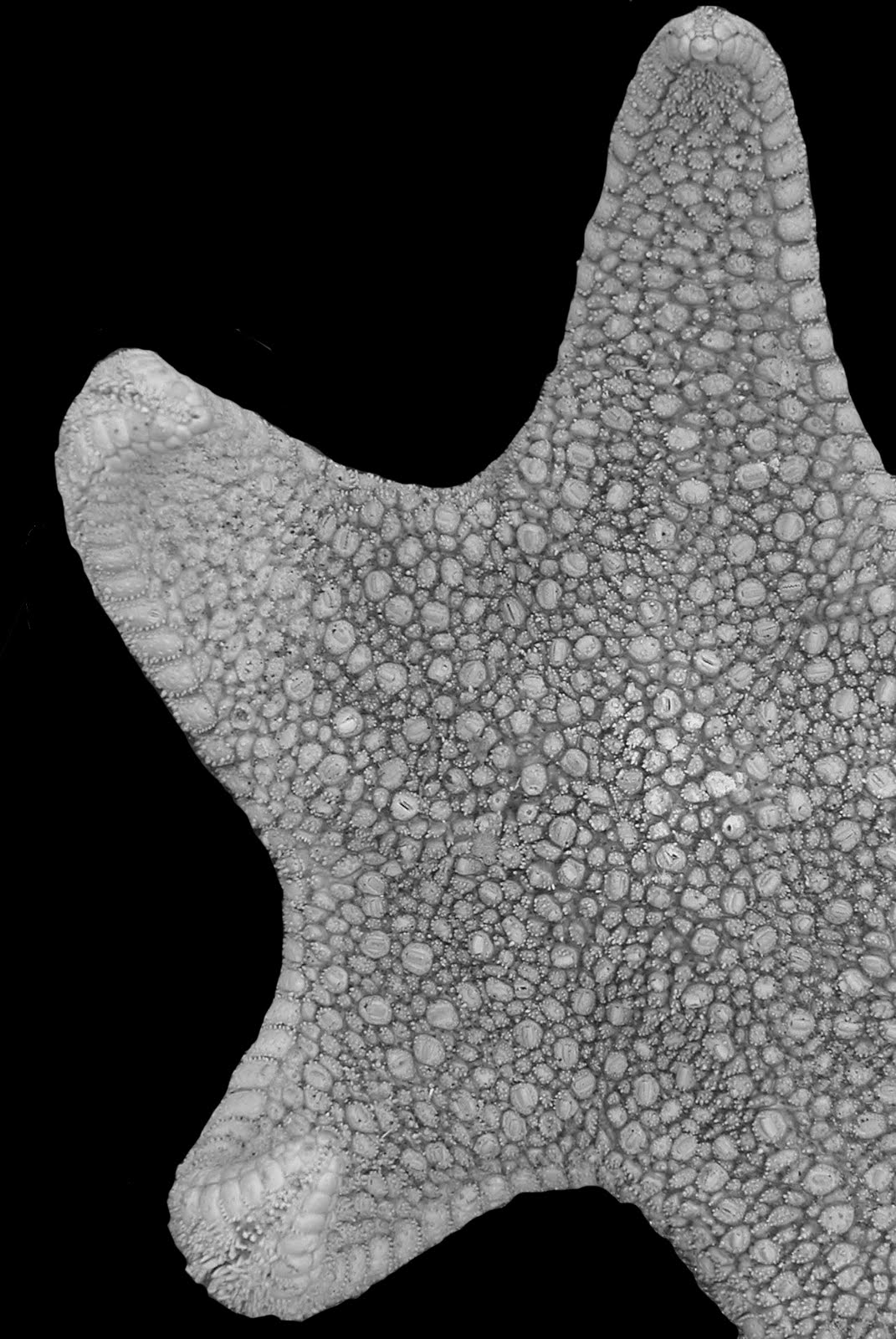
Sthenaster emmae

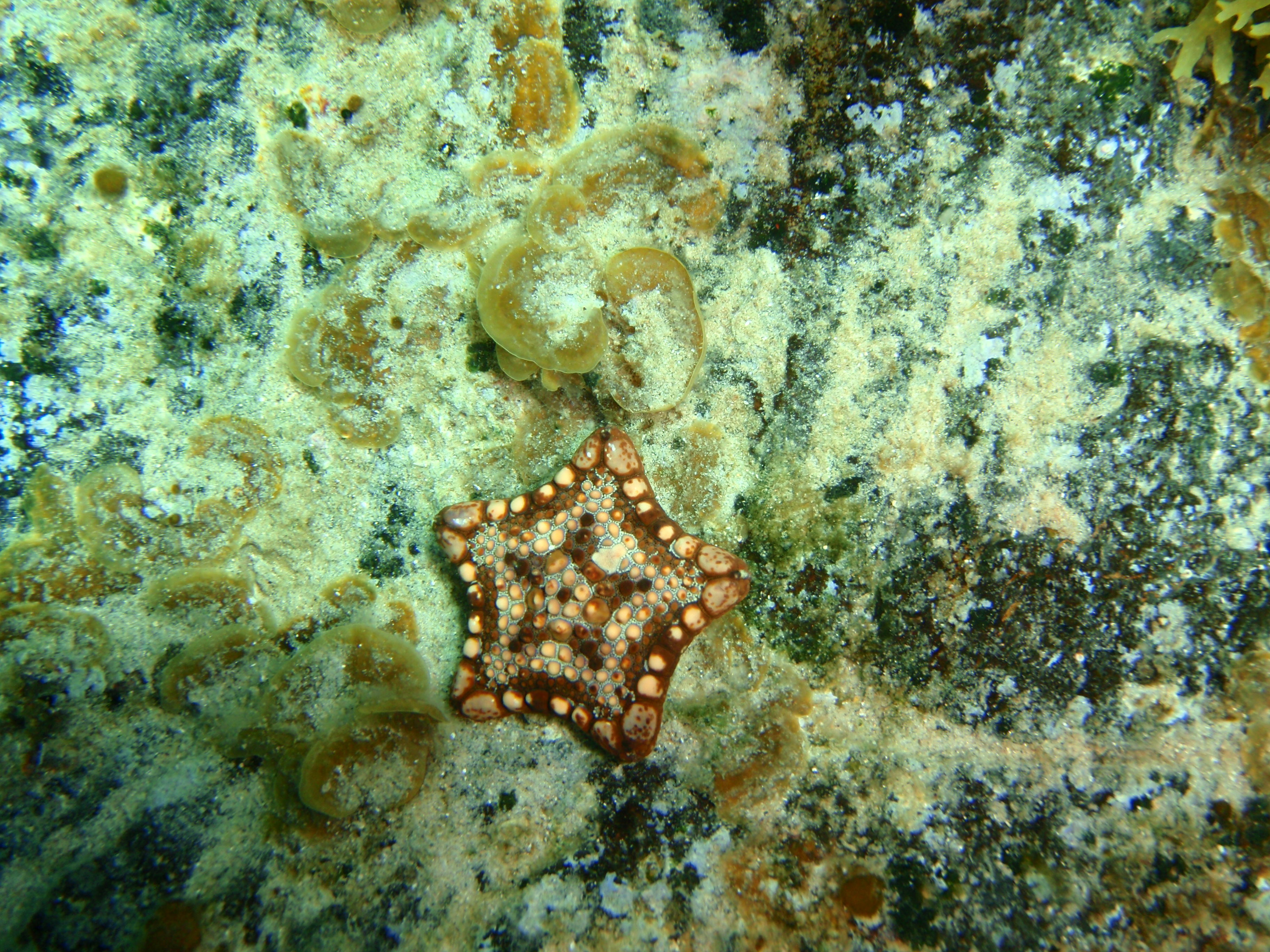
Tosia australis

== Extinct genera ==
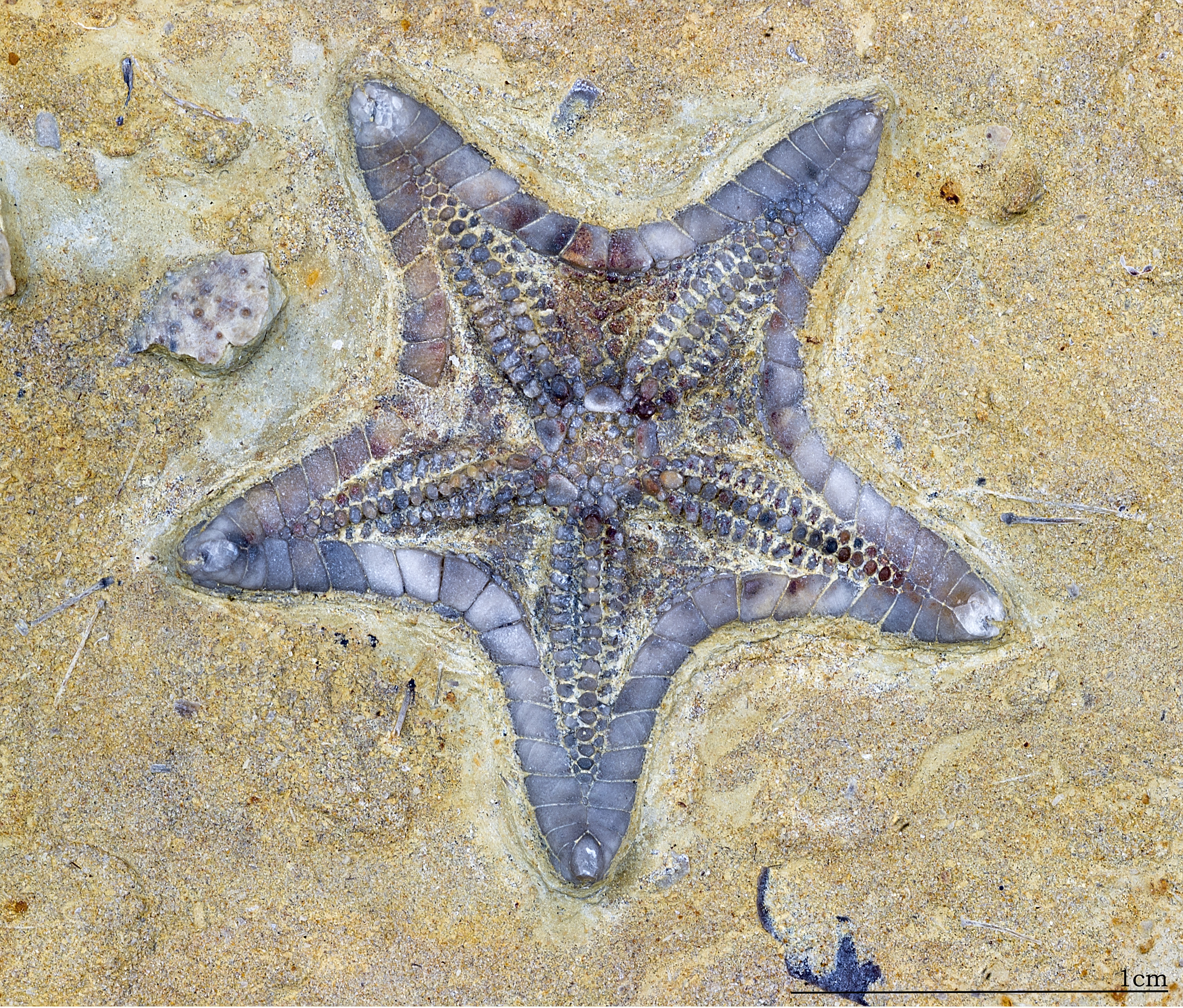
Fossil of Marocaster coronatus.

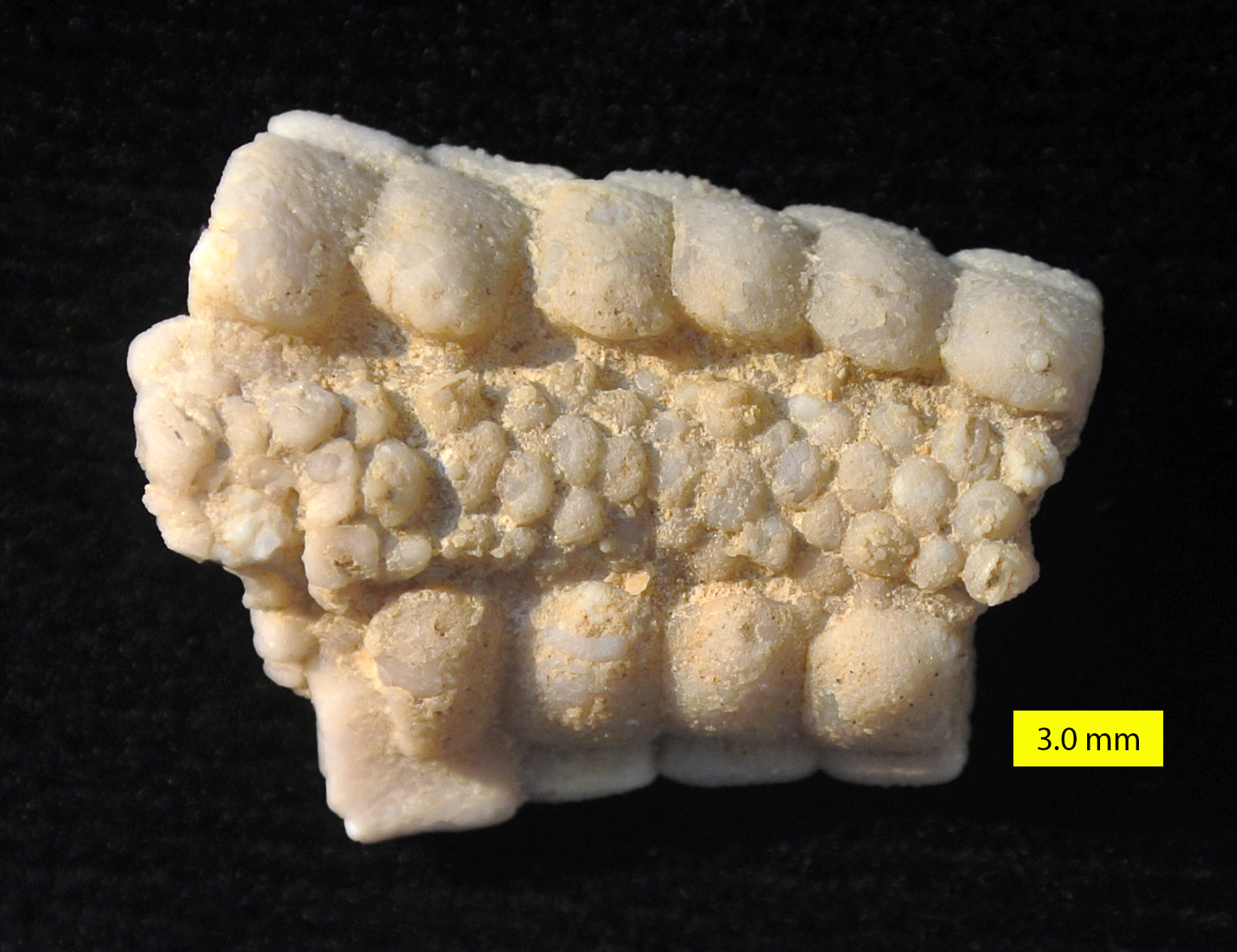
Ray fragment of fossil goniasterid; Zichor Formation (Coniacian, Upper Cretaceous), southern Israel.

Lists of genera containing extinct species according to fossilworks.

- Bugarachaster Breton 1992
- Buterminaster Blake and Zinsmeister 1988
- Caletaster Breton 1978
- Capellia Blake and Reid 1998
- Cenomanaster Wright 1951
- Chomataster Spencer 1913
- Codellaster Blake and Kues 2002
- Comptonia Gray 1840
- Comptoniaster Breton 1983
- Cottreauaster Wright 1951
- Crateraster Spencer 1913
- Cymbaster Breton and Néraudeau 2008
- Fayoumaster Roman and Strougo 1987
- Fomalhautia Blake and Reid 1998
- Forbesiaster de Loriol 1909
- Fredaster Breton and Néraudeau 2008
- Galbaster Villier et al. 2004
- Haccourtaster Jagt 2000
- Hessaster Gale 2011
- Huroeaster Valette 1915
- Leptogonium Pomel 1885
- Marocaster Blake and Reboul 2011
- Mastaster Mercier 1935
- Metopaster Sladen 1893
- Miopentagonaster Mercier 1935
- Nehalemia Blake 1973
- Noviaster Valette 1929
- Ocalaster Blake and Portell 2009
- Ophryaster Spencer 1913
- Oyenaster Blake and Portell 2009
- Pachyaster de Loriol 1909
- Parametopaster Breton 1992
- Pentetagonaster d'Orbigny 1850
- Pulcinellaster Breton 1992
- Recurvaster Brünnich-Nielsen 1943
- Skiaster Blake and Jagt 2005
- Spenceraster Lambert 1914
- Sucia Blake 1973
- Talecaster Breton 1992
- Teichaster Spencer 1913
- Tomidaster Sladen 1891
- Tylasteria Valette 1929
