= Cushion sea star =

There are many species of sea star colloquially called a "cushion sea star" or simply "cushion star." Some of these are listed here, under the highest taxonomic classification where they are referred to as such.

== Families ==
- Odontasteridae (Verrill, 1880)
  - Acodontaster conspicuus (Koehler, 1920)
  - Odontaster validus (Koehler, 1906)

== Genera ==
- Culcita (Agassiz, 1836)
  - Culcita coriacea (Müller & Troschel, 1842)
  - Culcita novaeguineae (Müller & Troschel, 1842)
  - Culcita schmideliana (Retzius, 1805)
- Ceramaster (Verrill, 1899)
  - Ceramaster arcticus (Verrill, 1909)
  - Ceramaster patagonicus (Sladen, 1889)

== Species ==
- Choriaster granulatus (Lütken, 1869)
- Meridiastra calcar (Lamarck, 1816)
- Asterina gibbosa (Pennant, 1777)
- Oreaster reticulatus (Linnaeus, 1758)
