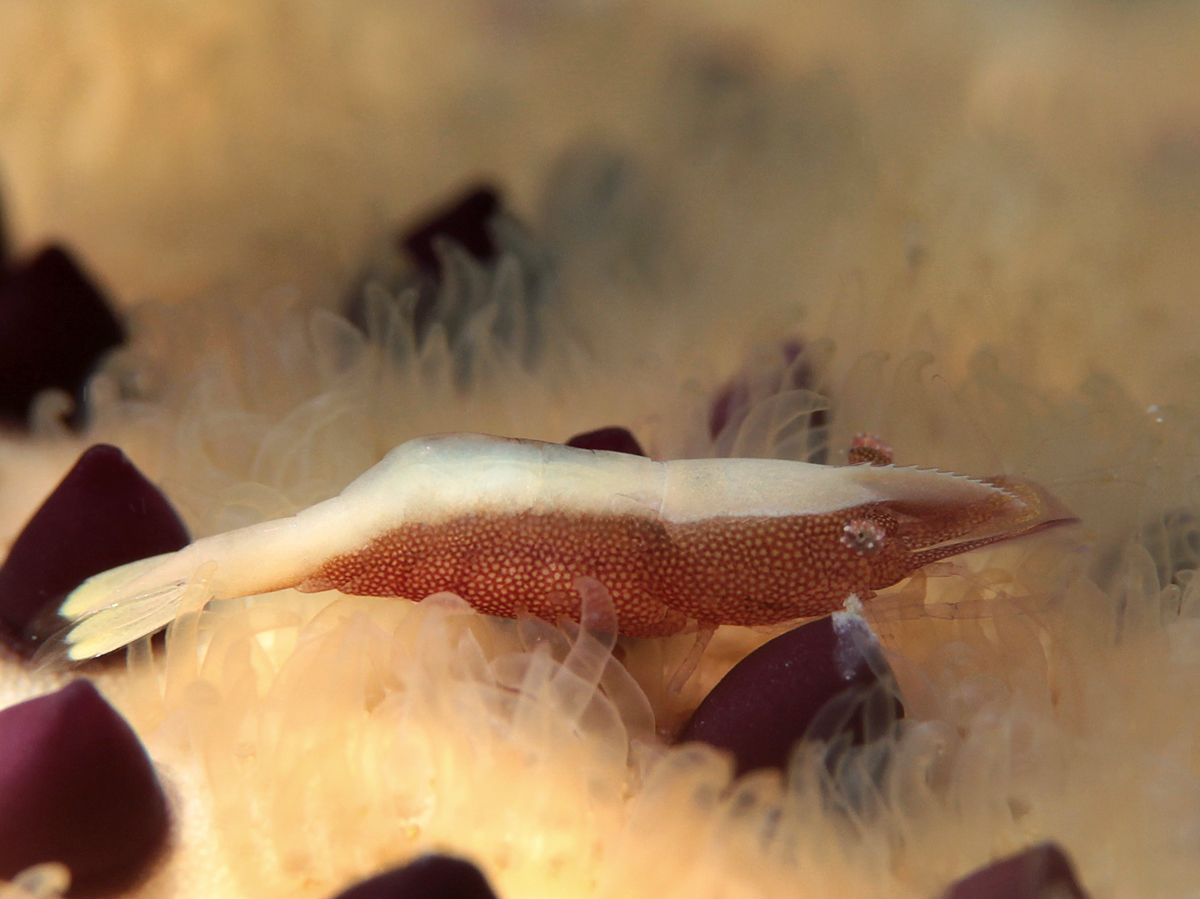
- Starfish shrimp on a Culcita schmideliana

Scientific classification
- Kingdom: Animalia
- Phylum: Arthropoda
- Class: Malacostraca
- Order: Decapoda
- Suborder: Pleocyemata
- Infraorder: Caridea
- Family: Palaemonidae
- Genus: Zenopontonia
- Species: Z. soror

Binomial name
- Zenopontonia soror (Nobili, 1904)

Synonyms
- Periclimenes bicolor Edmondson, 1935; Periclimenes frater Borradaile, 1915; Periclimenes parasiticus Borradaile, 1898; Periclimenes soror Nobili, 1904

= Zenopontonia soror =

Species of shrimp

Zenopontonia soror, the starfish shrimp or seastar shrimp, is a species of shrimp in the family Palaemonidae. It is found in shallow water in the tropical Indo-Pacific region. It lives in association with a starfish, often changing its colour to match that of its host.

== Description ==
Zenopontonia soror is a medium-sized shrimp growing to a length of about 1.5 cm (0.6 in). It has a short, broad rostrum that curves downwards and has ten or eleven teeth on its dorsal surface. It is liberally covered with small white spots, the main colour mimicking that of its host starfish; on Linckia laevigata it is blue; on Acanthaster it is two-coloured, bright red with a pale dorsal streak, and on Culcita it is a less-speckled, clear colour, sometimes with a transparent dorsal streak, blue or maroon, or sometimes white, yellow or pale green. It could be mistaken for the imperial shrimp (Zenopontonia rex), but that species uses a sea cucumber or large mollusc as a host.

== Distribution and habitat ==
Zenopontonia soror is found in the shallow tropical Indo-Pacific region, its range extending from the Red Sea to New Caledonia, French Polynesia, Mayotte and Reunion. It occurs on coral reefs at depths down to about 30 m (100 ft).

== Ecology ==
Zenopontonia soror is always found in association with a starfish, usually on the undersurface. Acanthaster seems to be its favourite host, but it has also been found on Culcita, Choriaster, Protoreaster, Echinaster, Halityle and Linckia, and it may also be associated with other starfish species. The shrimp appears to recognise a potential host by chemical cues in the water. It does not necessarily remain on a single starfish permanently, but if separated from its host, will search for another starfish of the same species. Up to about fifty individual shrimps have been found on a single host; the shrimps feed on mucus secreted by the starfish and benefit from the protection from predation provided by its carnivorous host.
