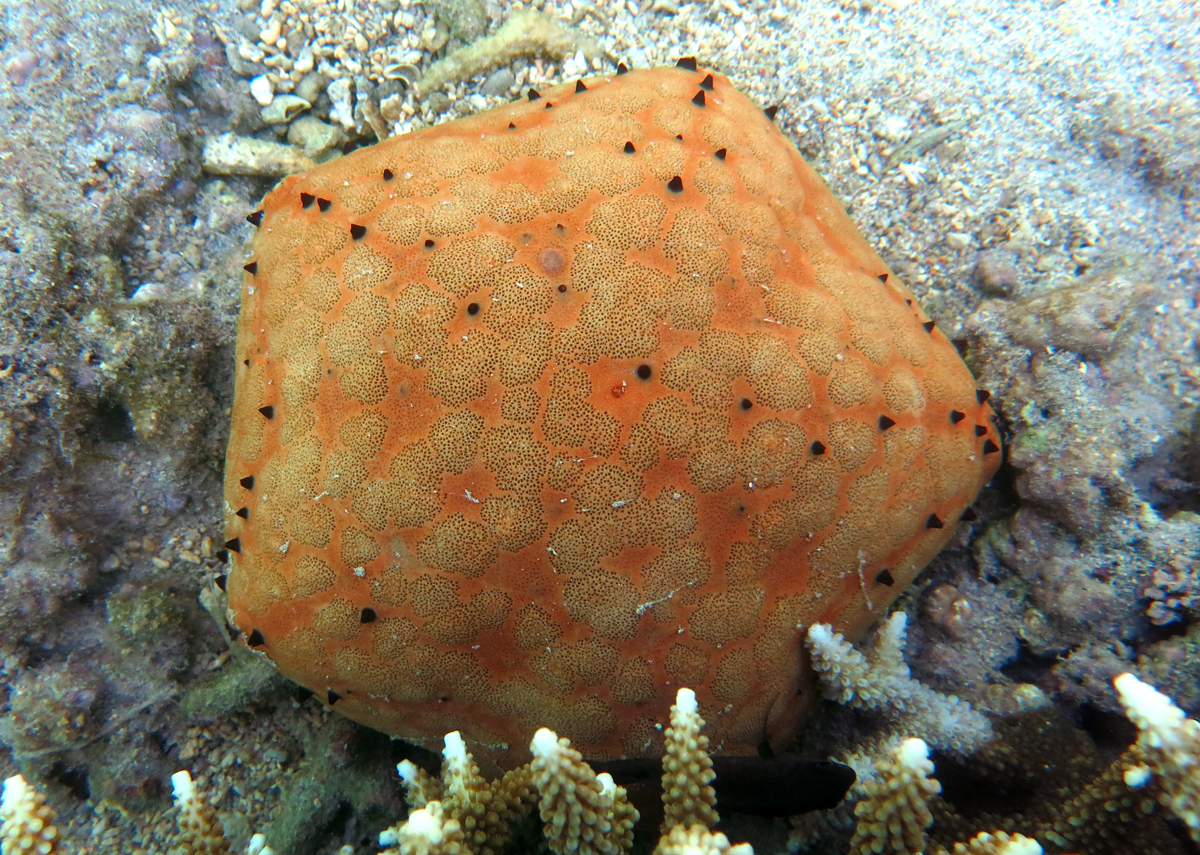

Scientific classification
- Domain: Eukaryota
- Kingdom: Animalia
- Phylum: Echinodermata
- Class: Asteroidea
- Order: Valvatida
- Family: Oreasteridae
- Genus: Culcita
- Species: C. schmideliana

Binomial name
- Culcita schmideliana (Retzius, 1805)

Synonyms
- Asterias discoidea Lamarck, 1816; Asterias schmideliana Retzius, 1805; Culcita schmideliana var. africana Döderlein, 1896; Goniodiscus studeri deLoriol, 1885

= Culcita schmideliana =

Species of starfish

Culcita schmideliana, commonly known as the spiny cushion star, is a species of pin-cushion star. It has a variety of base colors and often patches of a different color. It is pentagonal in shape and lives in the tropical Indo-Pacific. This species is rarely kept by hobby aquarists.

== Description ==
Culcita schmideliana is a roughly pentagonal starfish with a leathery surface and an inflated appearance. It is subglobose in shape when fully adult, with a very convex aboral (upper) surface and flat base. The aboral surface is scattered with small conical spines (that supposedly never enter the papular zones) and the oral (under) surface has small granulations and is clad in large conical tubercles, those nearest the ambulacral grooves and the margin being ovate in cross section and the largest. This starfish varies in color but often has a greyish background with small pink patches mostly adjacent to black tubercles. The madreporite is usually an orangeish color. This starfish often has several commensal animals in its body cavity or on its surface. A carapid fish is usually to be found living in its stomach and sometimes the polychaete worm Gastrolepidia clavigera crawls over its surface. There is also often a tiny commensal shrimp Periclimenes soror hiding almost invisibly on its aboral surface.

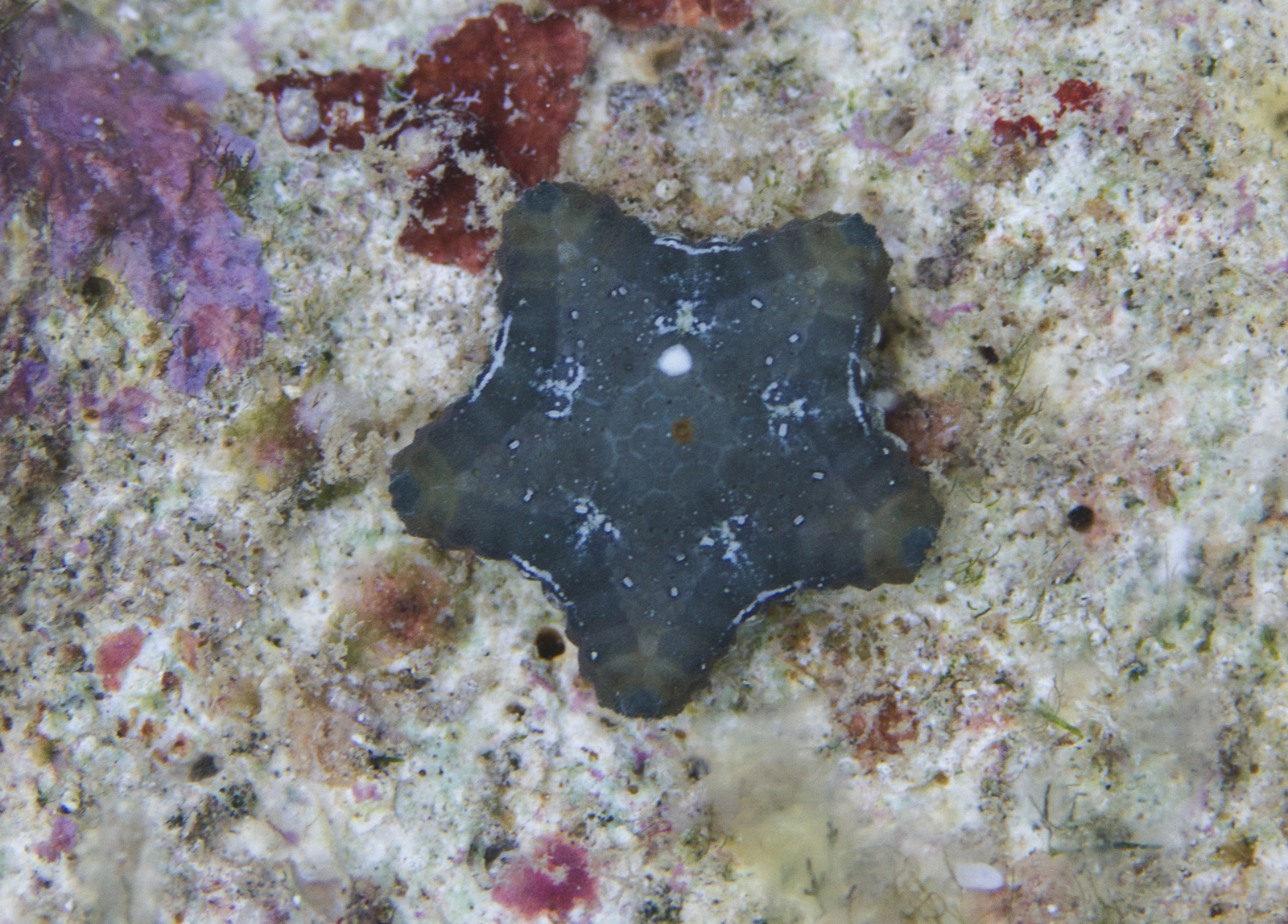
Flat juvenile

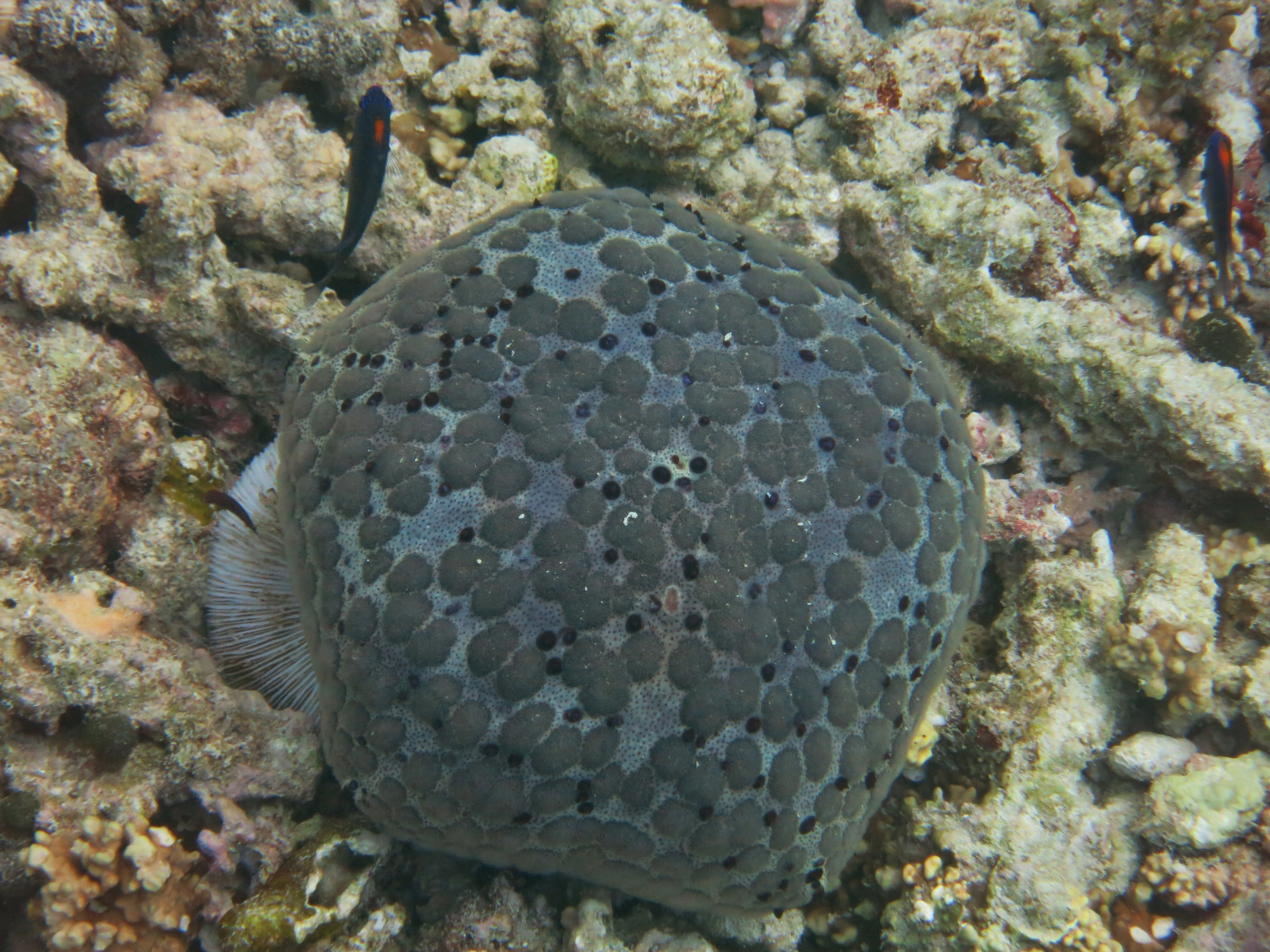
idem

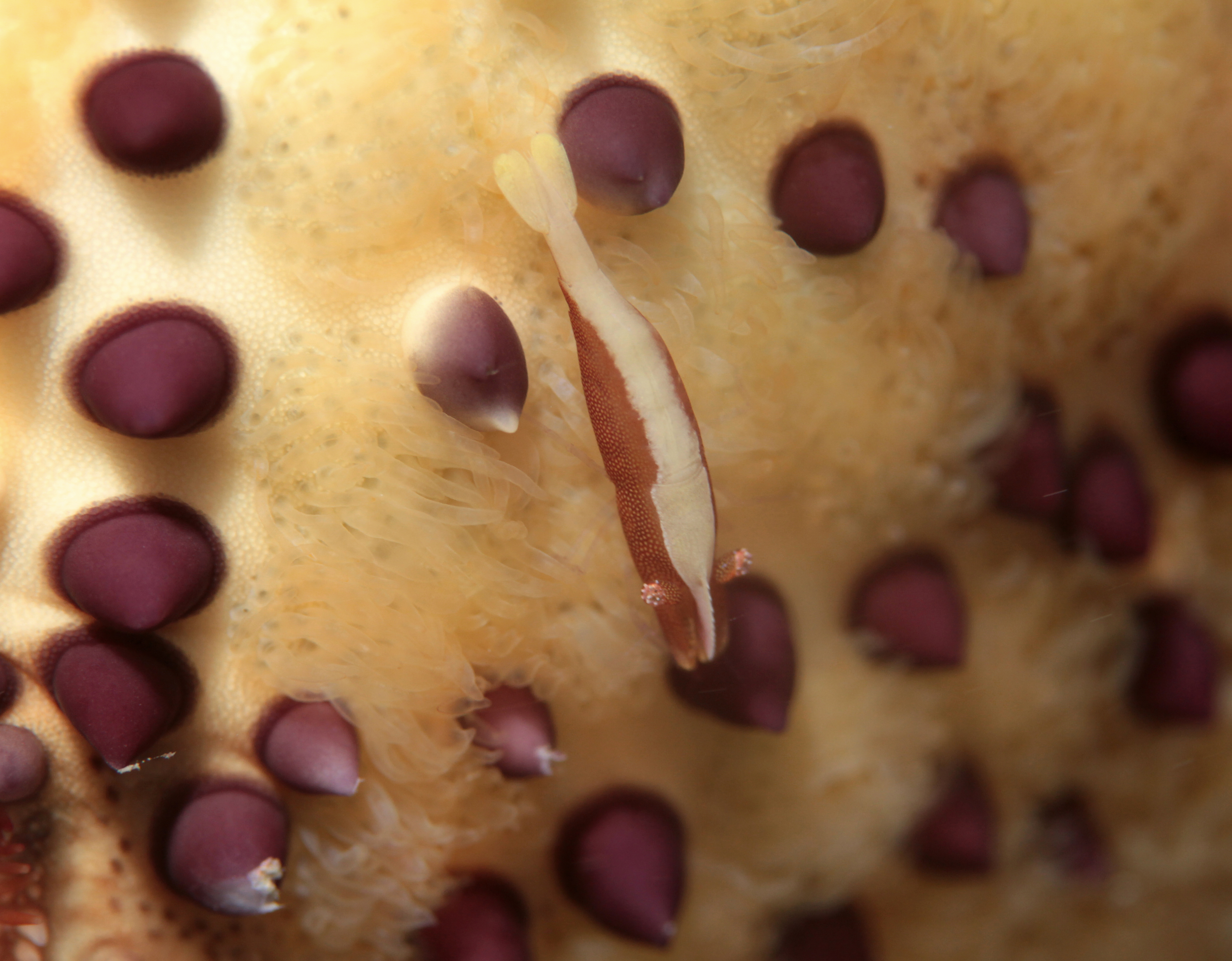
A symbiotic shrimp (Periclimenes soror)

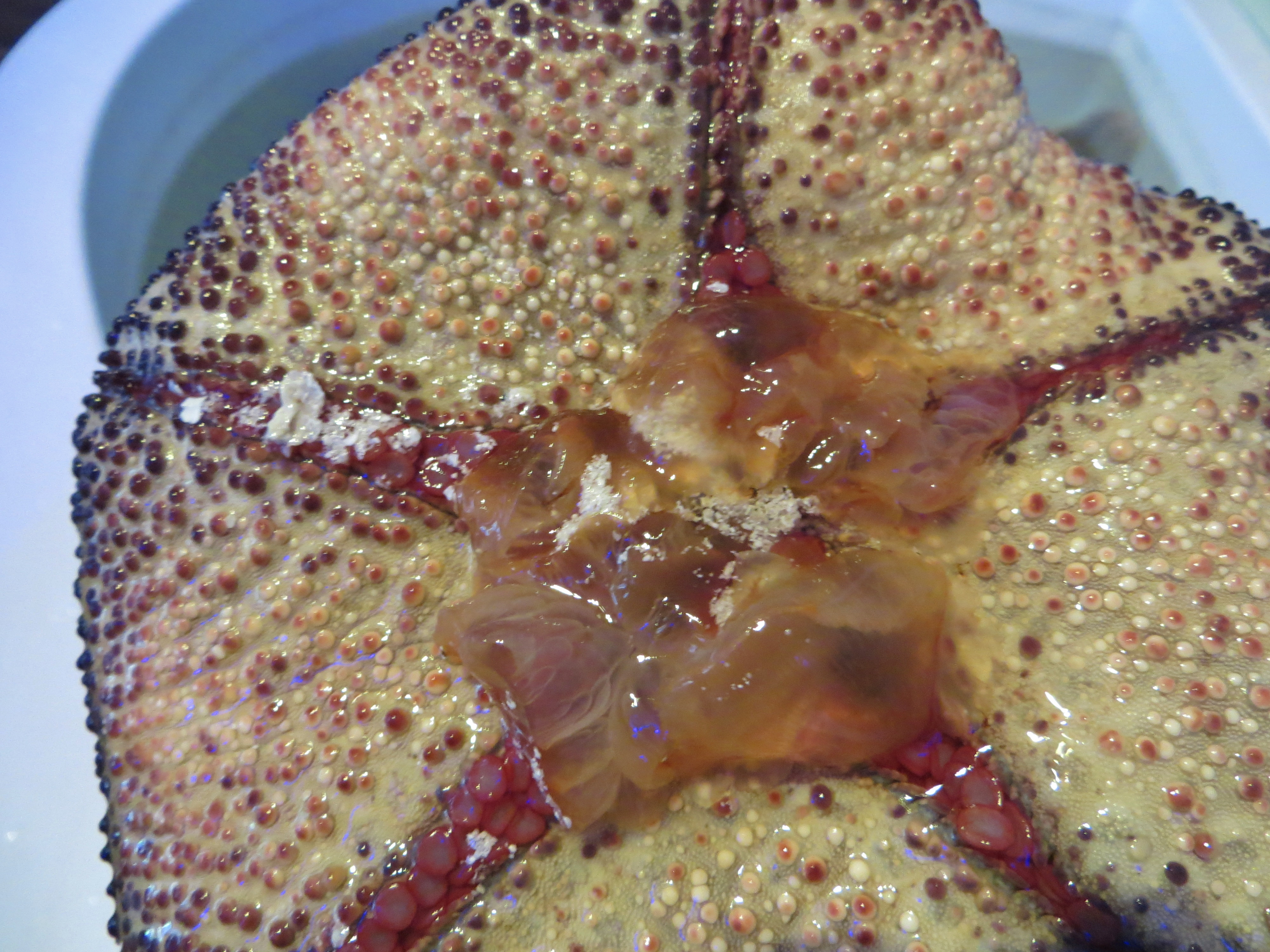
Underside, with everted stomach for feeding.

== Distribution and habitat ==
Culcita schmideliana is native to the tropical western Indo-Pacific. Its range extends from Madagascar, the East African coast and the Red Sea to Aldabra, Chagos, Philippines Islands, the Seychelles, the Maldives, Sri Lanka and Australia. It is found in lagoon areas and on inner reef flats with seagrasses and among algae at depths down to about 92 m (302 ft).

== Behaviour ==
Culcita schmideliana feeds mainly on the epibenthic film of organic detritus and micro-organisms growing on algae and sea grasses. It also browses on the sponge Gellius cymiformis, which is usually associated with the symbiotic alga Ceratodictyon spongiosum, and the living tissues and polyps of the stony corals Galaxea and Goniopora and the soft coral Xenia. In grazing in this way on corals it resembles the better known cushion star Culcita novaeguineae.
