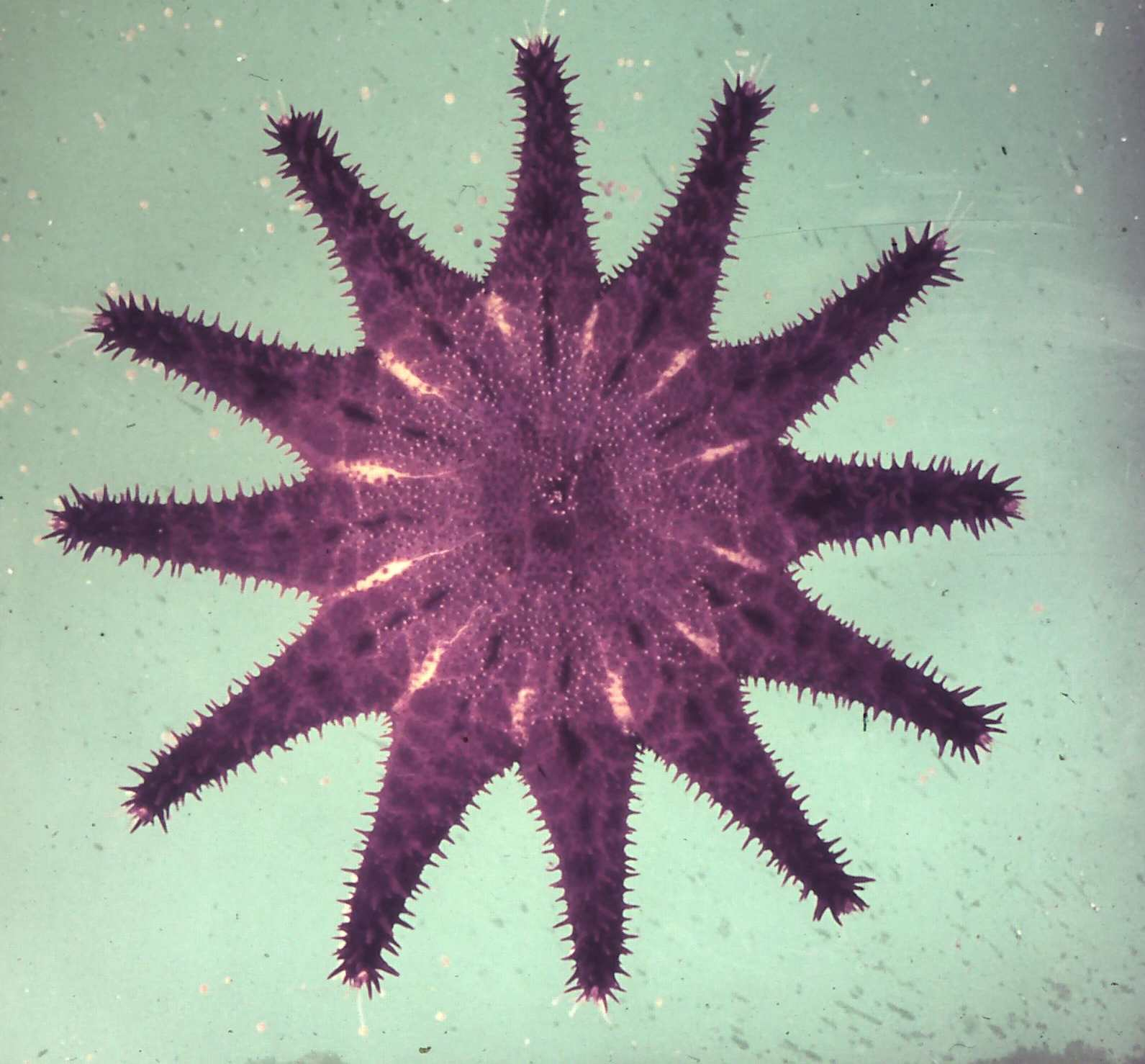
- Specimen collected by trawling on soft substrate inshore of the Great Barrier Reef

Scientific classification
- Kingdom: Animalia
- Phylum: Echinodermata
- Class: Asteroidea
- Order: Valvatida
- Family: Acanthasteridae
- Genus: Acanthaster
- Species: A. brevispinus

Binomial name
- Acanthaster brevispinus Fisher 1917, p. 92

= Acanthaster brevispinus =

Species of starfish

Acanthaster brevispinus, the short-spined crown-of-thorns starfish, is one of the two members of the starfish genus Acanthaster, along with the much better-known A. planci, the common crown-of-thorns starfish.

== Physical description ==
The body form of A. brevispinus is fundamentally the same as that of a typical starfish or seastar. Like A. planci, however, its distinctive traits include being disc-shaped, multiple-armed with multiple madreporites, flexible, prehensile, and densely spined, and having a large ratio of stomach surface to body mass. Its prehensile ability arises from the two rows of numerous tube feet that extend to the tip of each arm. In being multiple-armed, it has lost the five-fold symmetry (pentamerism) typical of starfish, although it begins with this symmetry in its life cycle.

Acanthaster brevispinus is readily distinguished from A. planci in that it has:

- dense blunt spines over the upper (aboral) surface of its disc
- short pedicellaria on its aboral surface
- purple-brown aboral surface becoming more intense along the arms
- blotches of darker colour around the perimeter of the disc and along the arms, including a large blotch at the base of each arm
- pale marks on the disc between each arm
- spines along it arms which are not as long as in A. planci
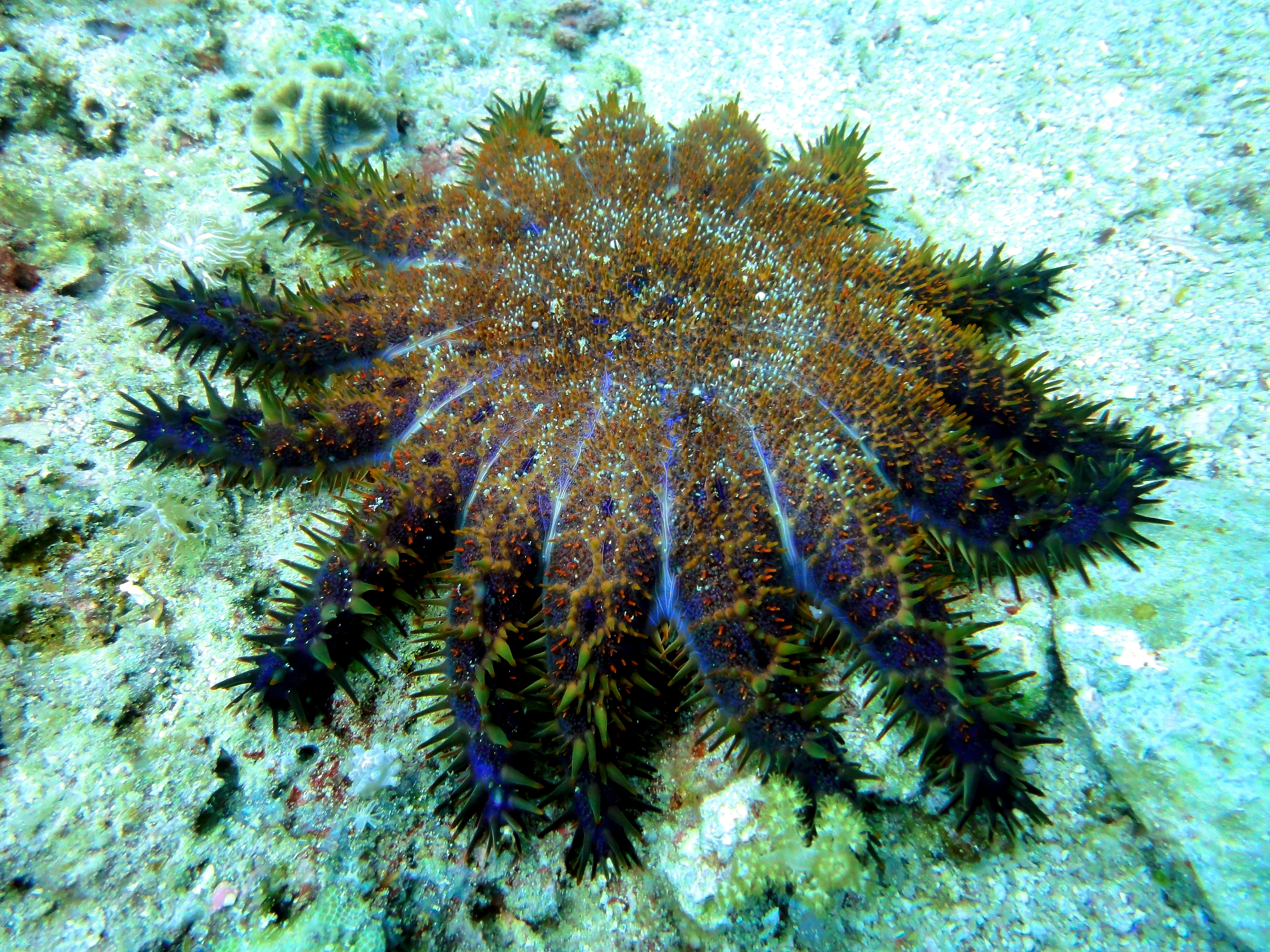
Underwater in the Philippines

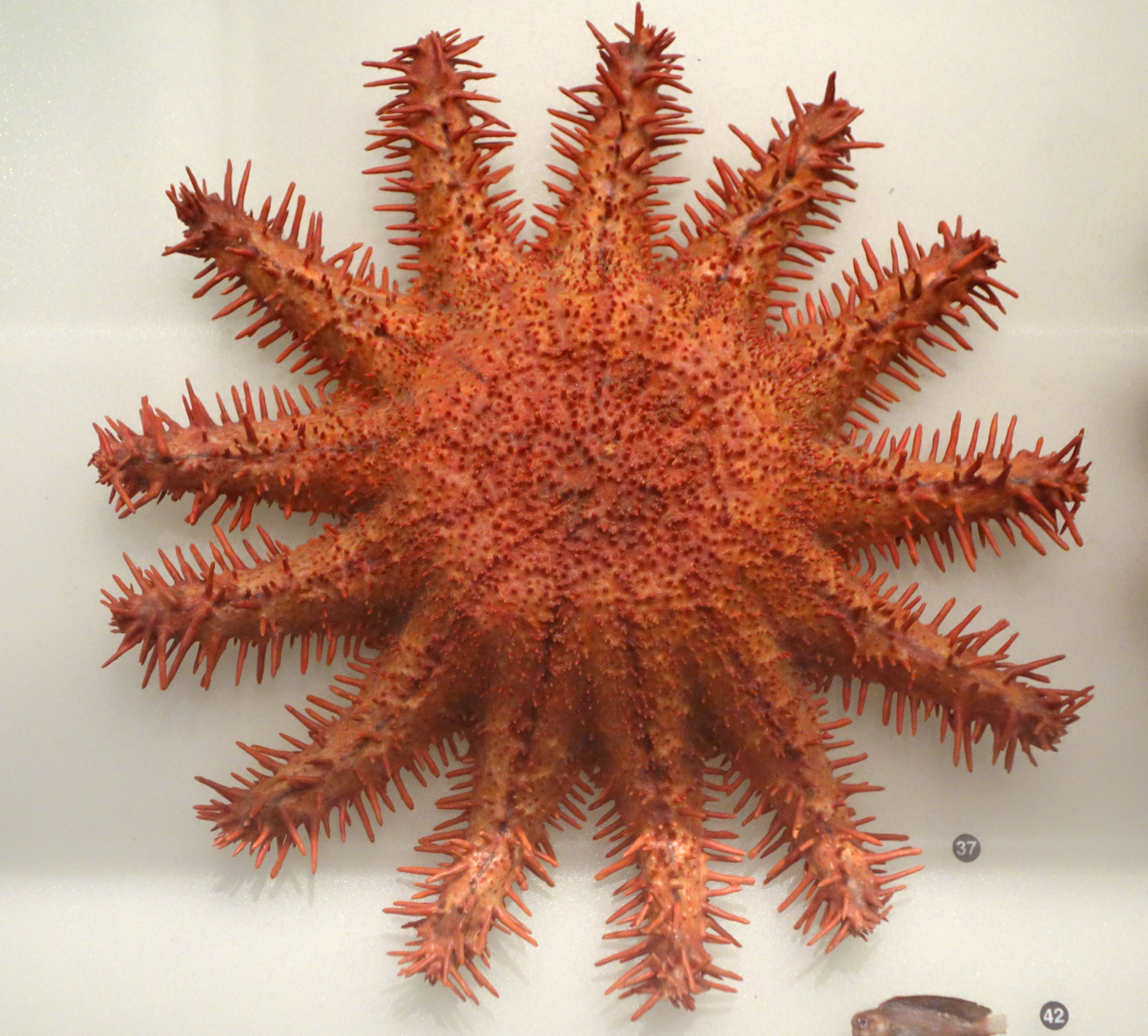
Preserved specimen at Tokyo Museum

== Taxonomy ==
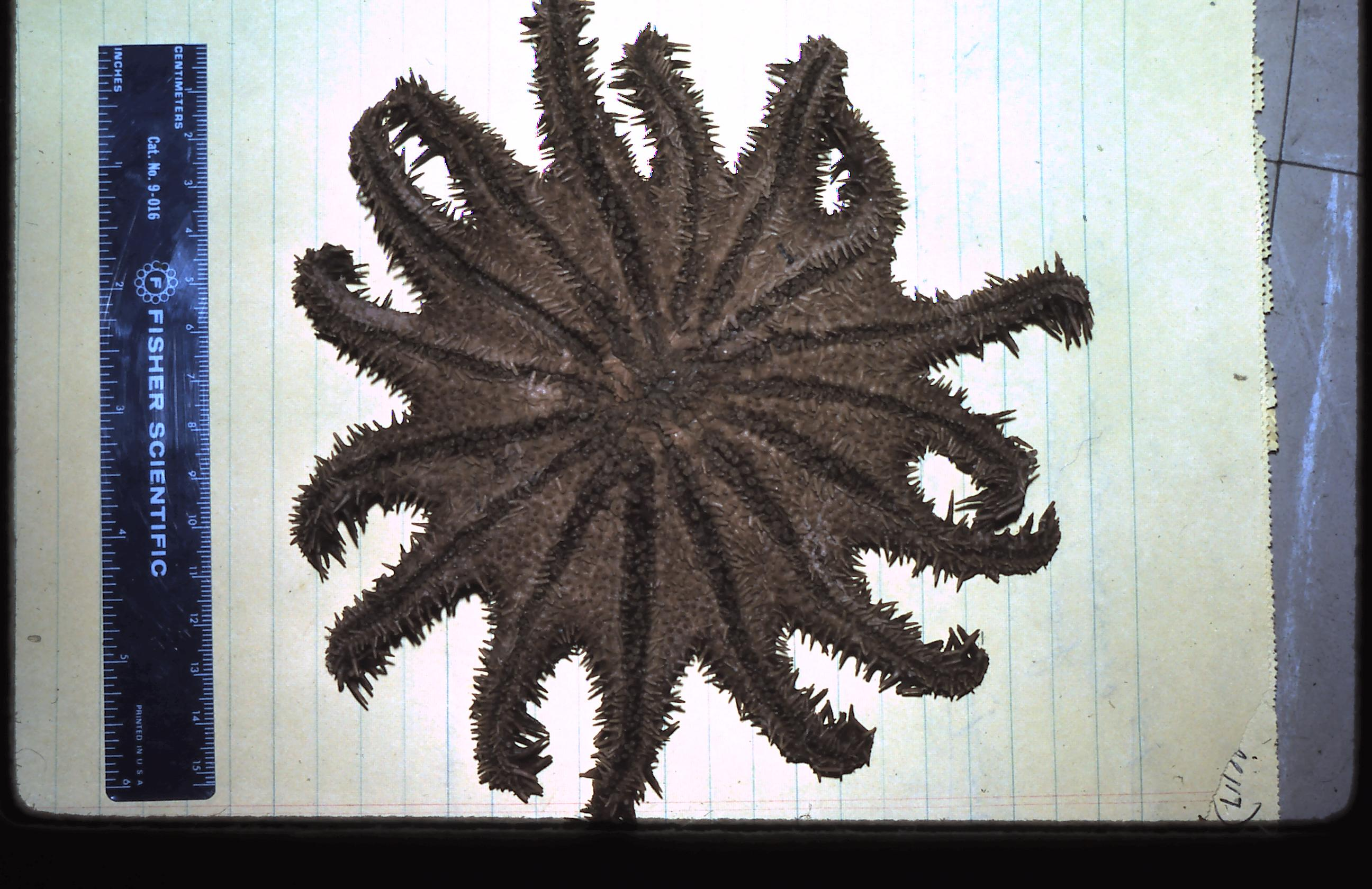
A. brevispinus holotype, oral surface

A. brevispinus was described by the American zoologist Walter Kenrick Fisher from a specimen collected at 18 m deep off Sirun Island, Sulu Archipelago, Philippines. The holotype is lodged in the U.S. National Museum, Washington, registration number USNM37027.

Madsen (1955) reviewed the taxonomy of the genus Acanthaster and concluded that there were three species: the Indo-Pacific A. planci(L.); the short-armed, blunt spined eastern Pacific A. ellisii (Gray) and A. brevispinus Fisher. Madsen suspected that A. brevispinus was part of the variability of A. planci over its wide geographical range. See Acanthaster planci for a treatment of the status of Acanthaster ellisii.

Subsequently, A. brevispinus was reported from the Great Barrier Reef region.

Jangoux and Aziz reported a specimen from the Seychelles. They considered it sufficiently different from the holotype in some features to describe it as A. brevispinus seyshellesensis nov. subsp.

== Etymology ==
The genus name Acanthaster comes from Ancient Greek ἄκανθα (ákantha), meaning "spine, thorn", and ἀστήρ (astḗr), meaning "star". The specific epithet brevispinus comes from Latin brevis, meaning "short", and spinus, meaning "spine".

== Geographic distribution, habitat, and diet ==
The short-spined crown-of-thorns starfish has been reported from the Philippines (western Pacific Ocean, southeast Asia), Great Barrier Reef (western Pacific Ocean, eastern Australia) and the Seychelles (western Indian Ocean). These are widely separated locations and it is not possible to accurately describe the geographic distribution of this species, except it is broad and sympatric with a significant part of the distribution of A. planci. The locations are also within the tropics or subtropics. The highest latitude from which it has been collected is at the southern part of the Great Barrier Reef.

All specimens have been collected from at least moderate depth: 18 m, 20+ m and 63 m in the Seychelles. A. brevispinus was not abundant at any of these localities, judging from the one or few collected, although this possibly is an artifact of the ways they were collected. Apparently, all were collected from soft substrates, not hard substrates like coral reef. Data are minimal on the benthic communities of which they are a part.

The Great Barrier Reef specimens used by Lucas and Jones came as an incidental bycatch of trawling inshore of the Great Barrier Reef off Townsville in the central zone of the reef. They came from a sandy substrate. Two invertebrates were also collected in the trawls: the scallops Amusium balloti and A. pleuronectes. Scallops would seem to be difficult prey for slow-moving starfish with their rapid swimming by 'flapping' their valves and with 'eyes' on their mantle edges. In the laboratory, however, the starfish were able to trap unrestrained scallops. They slowly approached the scallop over its hinge, where they were less visible, so when the scallop detected the starfish, its movements were towards and under the starfish's disk, where it could be trapped. Only a portion of attempts at trapping scallops were successful.

After trapping a scallop, the starfish fed and digested it while adopting a characteristic arched posture. A. brevispinus was fed commercial scallop meat as its standard laboratory diet, and they adopted the same arched feeding posture during feeding. This suggests scallops are a significant component of their normal diet, such that even the 'taste' of scallop meat triggers the distinct feeding behaviour. A. brevispinus, however, is quite omnivorous, at least according to observations in the laboratory.

== Experimental hybridization with A. planci ==
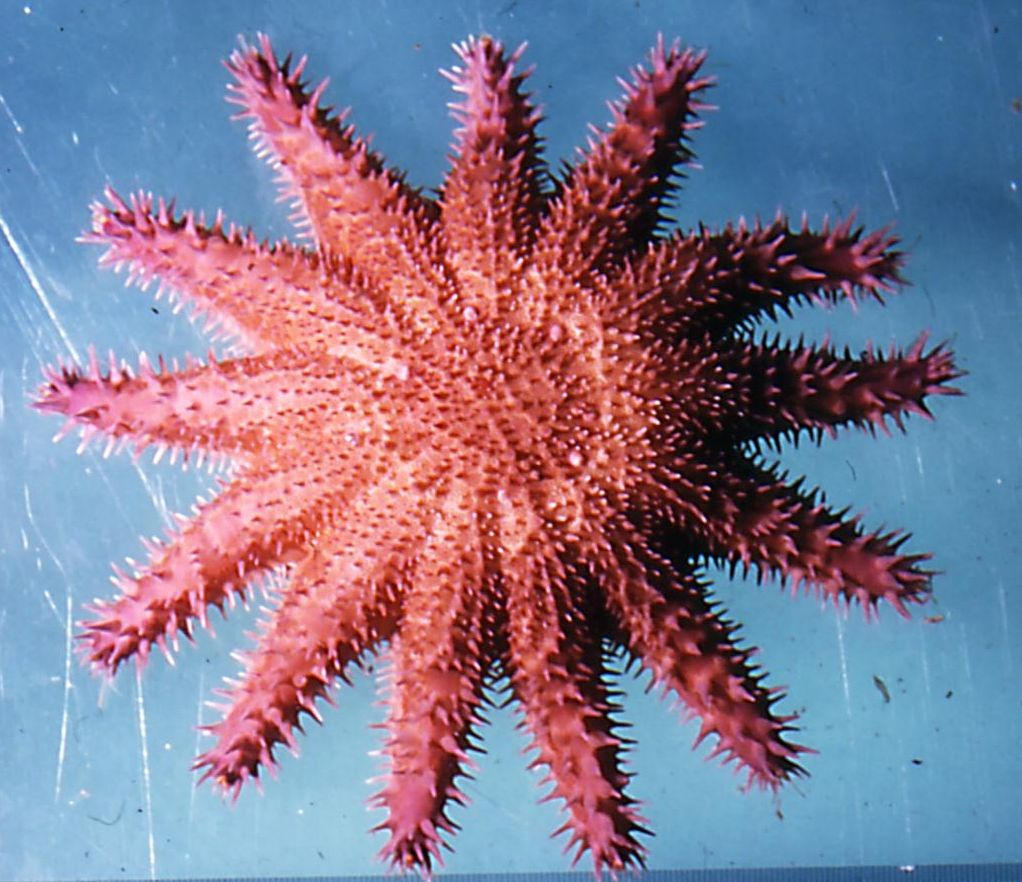
F1 A. planci hybrid

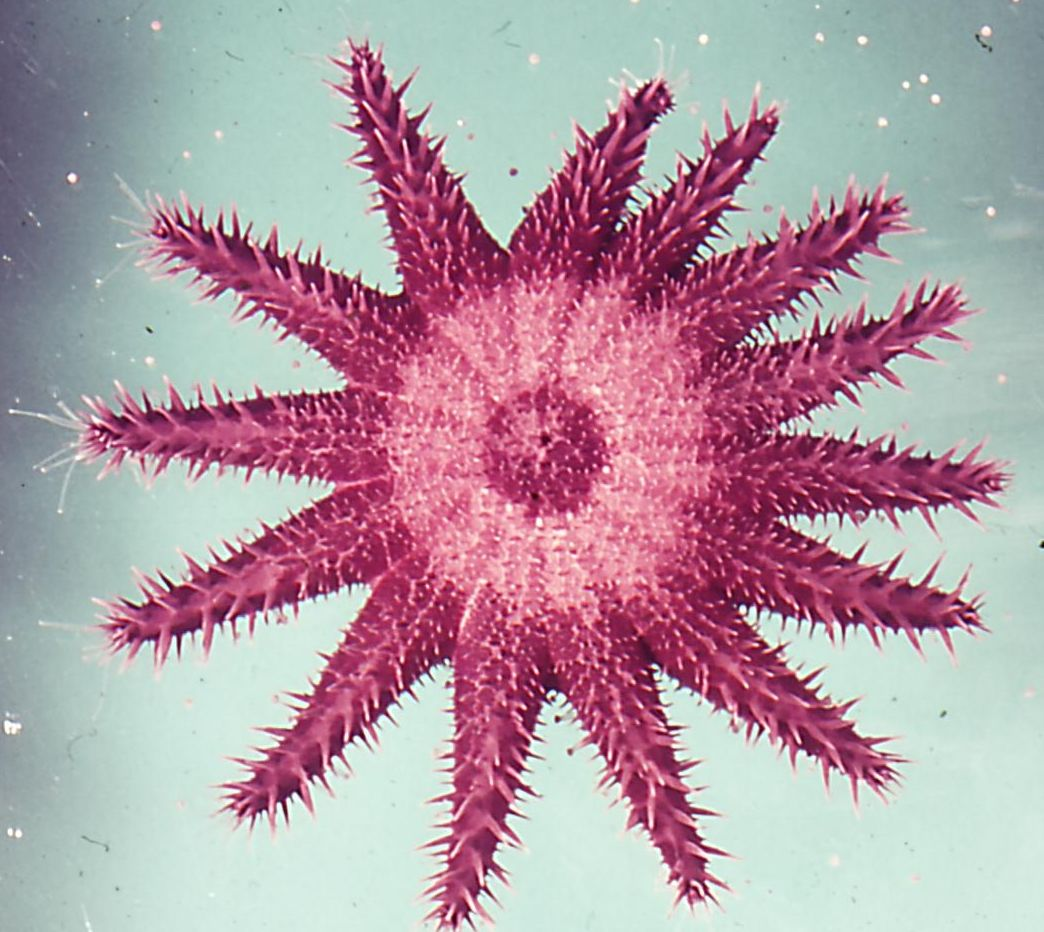
F1 A. brevispinus hybrid

In 1973, Lucas and Jones conducted a hybridization experiment to investigate genetic relatedness between A. brevispinus and A. planci. Specimens of A. brevispinus were obtained by trawling in December of that year, near the approximate time of annual gamete release by A. planci in Great Barrier Reef waters. The A brevispinus had ripe gonads and it was possible to dissect out gonad tissue without killing the starfish and thus obtain mature eggs (oocytes) and sperm. Mature eggs and sperm were also obtained from A. planci. Eggs were fertilized in vitro with sperm. Four groups of larvae resulting from the fertilizations were reared, i.e. larvae of each species and reciprocal crosses. The A. planci eggs fertilized by A. brevispinus sperm will be referred to subsequently as A. planci hybrids and correspondingly A. brevispinus hybrids, according to the source of eggs.

- A. brevispinus eggs X sperm
- A. brevispinus eggs X A. planci sperm (A. brevispinus hybrids)
- A. planci eggs X A. brevispinus sperm (A. planci hybrids)
- A. planci eggs X sperm

Fertilization rates were high for all gamete combinations, thus no evidence of gamete incompatibility between the species was noted. The larvae were reared according to the methods employed for A. planci and developed through the typical larval stages of bipinnaria and brachiolaria. Numbers of late-stage larvae were 10-29% of the original numbers of eggs, except for the A. brevispinus batch in which only a few normal late brachiolaria were seen. The subsequent development of the A planci batch and reciprocal hybrid batches followed the typical pattern of A. planci. There was settlement and metamorphosis into a five-armed starfish, 0.4–1 mm in diameter. They fed on encrusting algae. Many failed to develop normally, and six weeks after metamorphosis, 60 A. planci, 30 A. planci hybrids, six A. brevispinus hybrids, and no A. brevispinus starfish remained. It was impossible to distinguish the hybrids from A. planci during the early months of development, but when the hybrids were 200 mm in diameter, they were conspicuously different from this species. Hybrids showed intermediate features between the parent species. Spines were the immediately obvious feature, being intermediate in length between the species. In other features that distinguish A. planci and A. brevispinus, the hybrids were intermediate. The hybrids were variable, but no consistent differences were found between the two hybrids. Juvenile A. planci animals tended to have a 'bull's-eye' pattern on their aboral disks and this persisted in some adults. One of three adult A. brevispinus hybrids showed this pattern. None of the 12 adult A. planci hybrids showed it. None of the hybrids showed the pale marks between the bases of the arms that are characteristic of A. brevispinus.

Of particular interest was the inheritance of scallop-trapping behaviour by both hybrids, although they did not arch their bodies as much as A. brevispinus during feeding on scallops, possibly because their arms were thicker than those of A. brevispinus and less appropriate for this posture.

The hybrid starfish reached sexual maturity at the end of their second year (summer spawning season in the field). Further crosses were undertaken with these F1 generation hybrids to determine the extent to which gene flow through interbreeding could occur between the two species. Sexually mature male and female F1 A. brevispinus hybrids were not available and the crosses and reciprocal crosses were made with male and female F1 A. planci hybrids.

- F1 A. planci hybrid eggs × A. planci sperm
- A. planci eggs × F1 A. planci hybrid sperm
- F1 A. planci hybrid eggs × A. brevispinus sperm
- A. brevispinus eggs × F1 A. planci hybrid sperm
- F1 A. planci hybrid eggs × sperm

Although high fertilization rates were achieved again, without evidence of gamete incompatibility, survival was poor through early development and some morphological abnormalities occurred that had not been seen previously in batches of juvenile starfish. Introgression of genetic material broke down at this stage.
