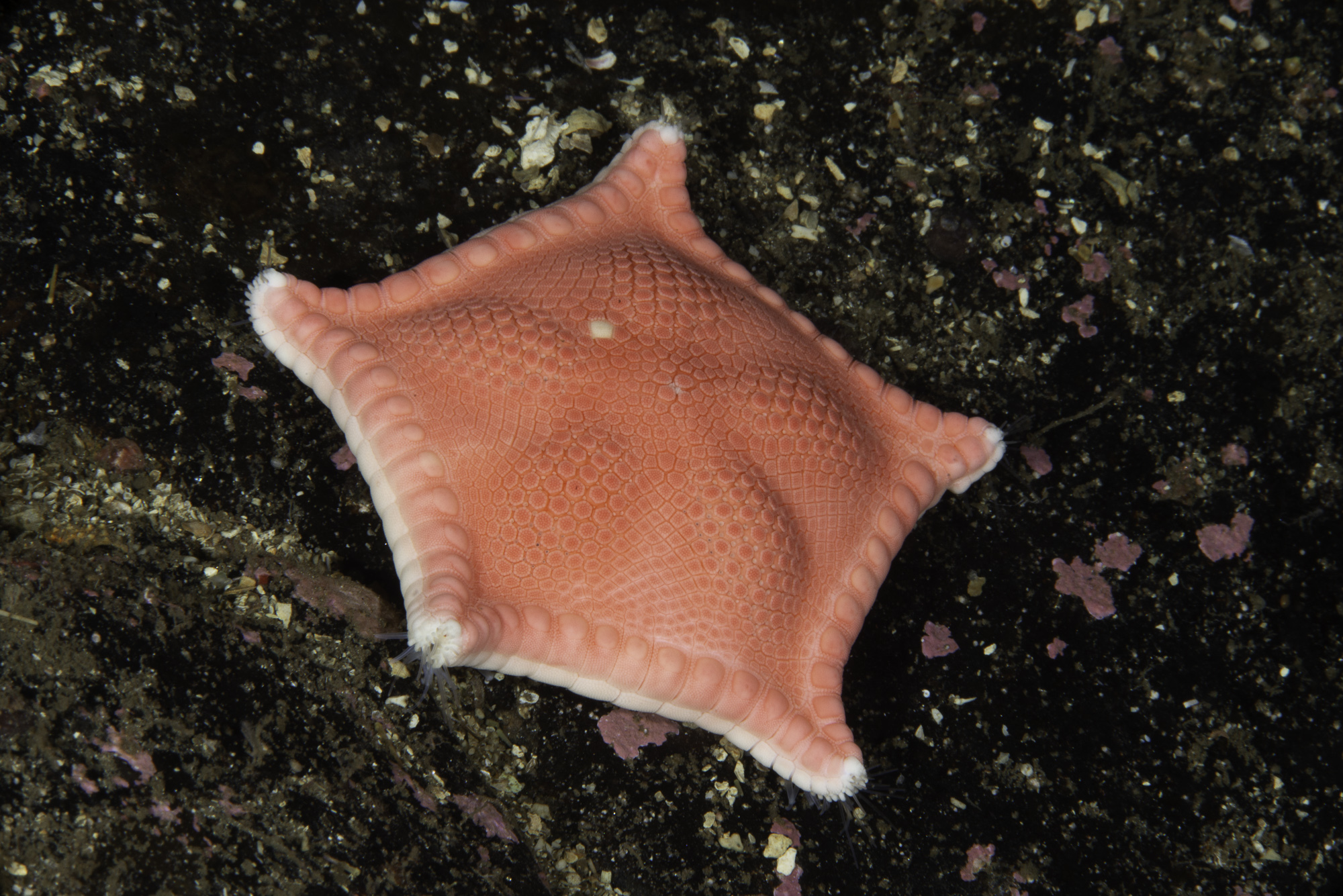
- Ceramaster granularis

Scientific classification
- Kingdom: Animalia
- Phylum: Echinodermata
- Class: Asteroidea
- Order: Valvatida
- Family: Goniasteridae
- Genus: Ceramaster; Verrill, 1899

Species
- See text

= Ceramaster =

Genus of starfishes

Ceramaster is a genus of cushion stars in the family Goniasteridae. The species in this genus have no arms. They live in deeper waters than most sea stars.

== Species list ==
Species in this genus include:

- Ceramaster arcticus (Verrill, 1909) - Arctic cookie star
- Ceramaster australis H.E.S. Clark, 2001
- Ceramaster bowersi (Fisher, 1906)
- Ceramaster clarki Fisher, 1910
- Ceramaster cuenoti (Koehler, 1909)
- Ceramaster glasbyi McKnight, 1993
- Ceramaster granularis (Retzius, 1783)
- Ceramaster grenadensis (Perrier, 1881)
- Ceramaster japonicus (Sladen, 1889)
- Ceramaster lennoxkingi McKnight, 1973
- Ceramaster leptoceramus (Fisher, 1905)
- Ceramaster misakiensis (Goto, 1914)
- Ceramaster mortenseni (Koehler, 1909)
- Ceramaster patagonicus (Sladen, 1889) - Cookie star
- Ceramaster smithi Fisher, 1913
- Ceramaster stellatus Djakonov, 1950
- Ceramaster trispinosus H.L. Clark, 1923

Note: Ceramaster placenta Fisher, 1911 is now accepted as Peltaster placenta (Müller & Troschel, 1842)
