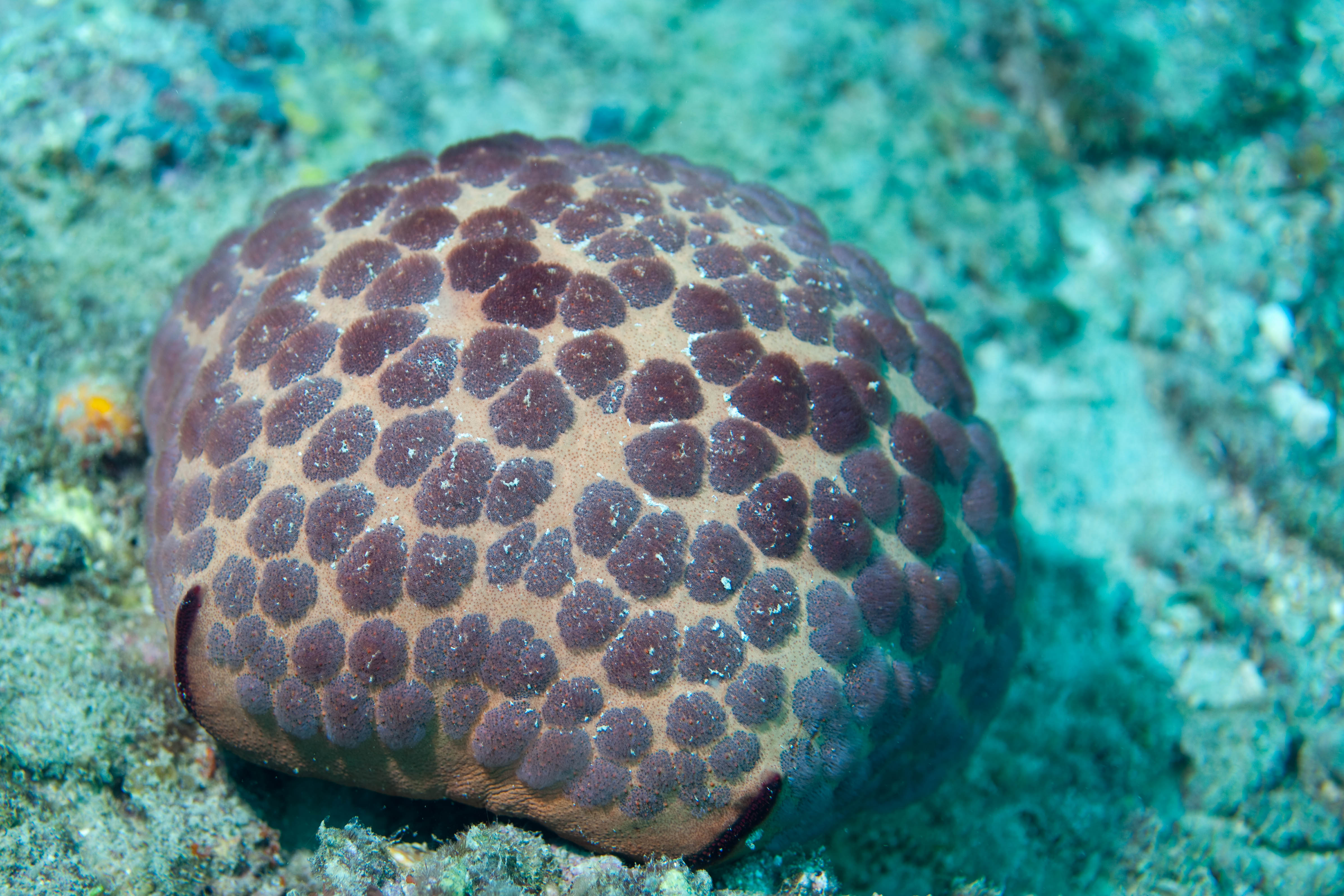

Scientific classification
- Kingdom: Animalia
- Phylum: Echinodermata
- Class: Asteroidea
- Order: Valvatida
- Family: Oreasteridae
- Genus: Culcita
- Species: C. novaeguineae

Binomial name
- Culcita novaeguineae Müller & Troschel, 1842

Synonyms
- See text

= Culcita novaeguineae =

Species of starfish

Culcita novaeguineae (common name, cushion star) is a species of starfish. It has short arms and an inflated appearance and resembles a pentagonal pincushion. It is variable in colour and can be found in tropical warm waters in the Indo-Pacific.

== Taxonomy ==
Culcita novaeguineae has numerous synonyms, at least in part because it has a "goniasterid" phase; the juveniles exhibit little resemblance to the mature form and gradually change in morphology as they grow. A number of different "species" were described in the literature before they were found to be different developmental stages of the same species. Some were even considered to be in a different family, the Goniasteridae, rather than in the correct family, Oreasteridae.

== Description ==
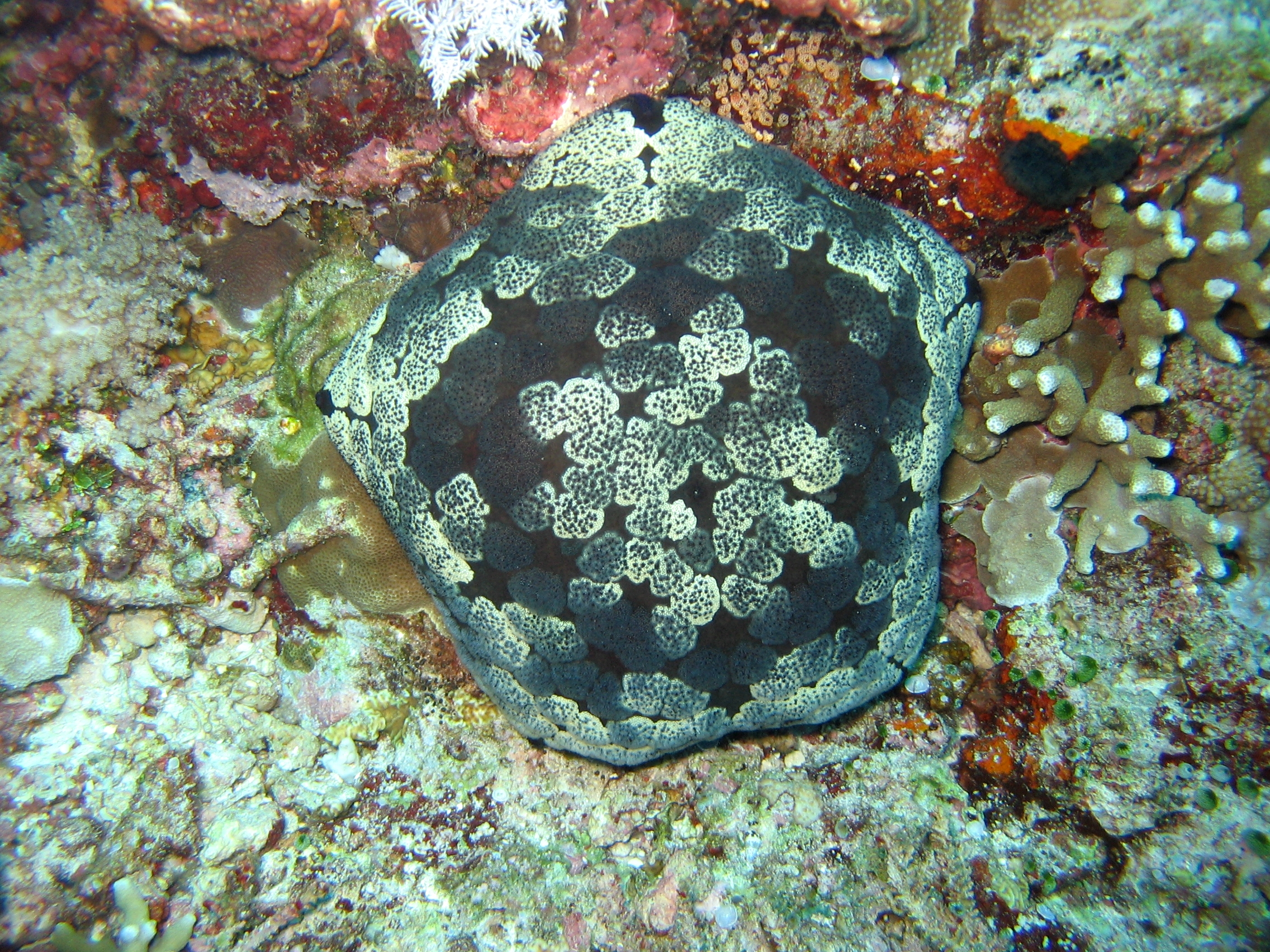
A cushion star in Apo Reef, Philippines

A mature C. novaeguineae is pentagonal to subglobose in shape with an inflated appearance and much-abbreviated arms. It can grow to a diameter of 30 cm (12 in). Rows of tube feet are on the underside, and it has a central mouth. The colour is very variable and includes a mottling with darker and lighter shades of fawn, brown, orange, yellow and green. The armoured body wall is made of calcareous ossicles which are supported internally by pillars which buttress the ambulacra. The armouring contains pits into which the tube feet can be retracted. The body cavity is filled with water. On the dorsal face, they can be covered with small conical tubercles, as well inside as outside of papular areas.

Small cushion stars are very different in appearance. They are star-shaped, with five short, broad arms and a low profile. As they grow, the inter-arm areas fill in and expand relative to the tube-feet areas, and the arms get shorter relative to the disc which becomes inflated and more massive.

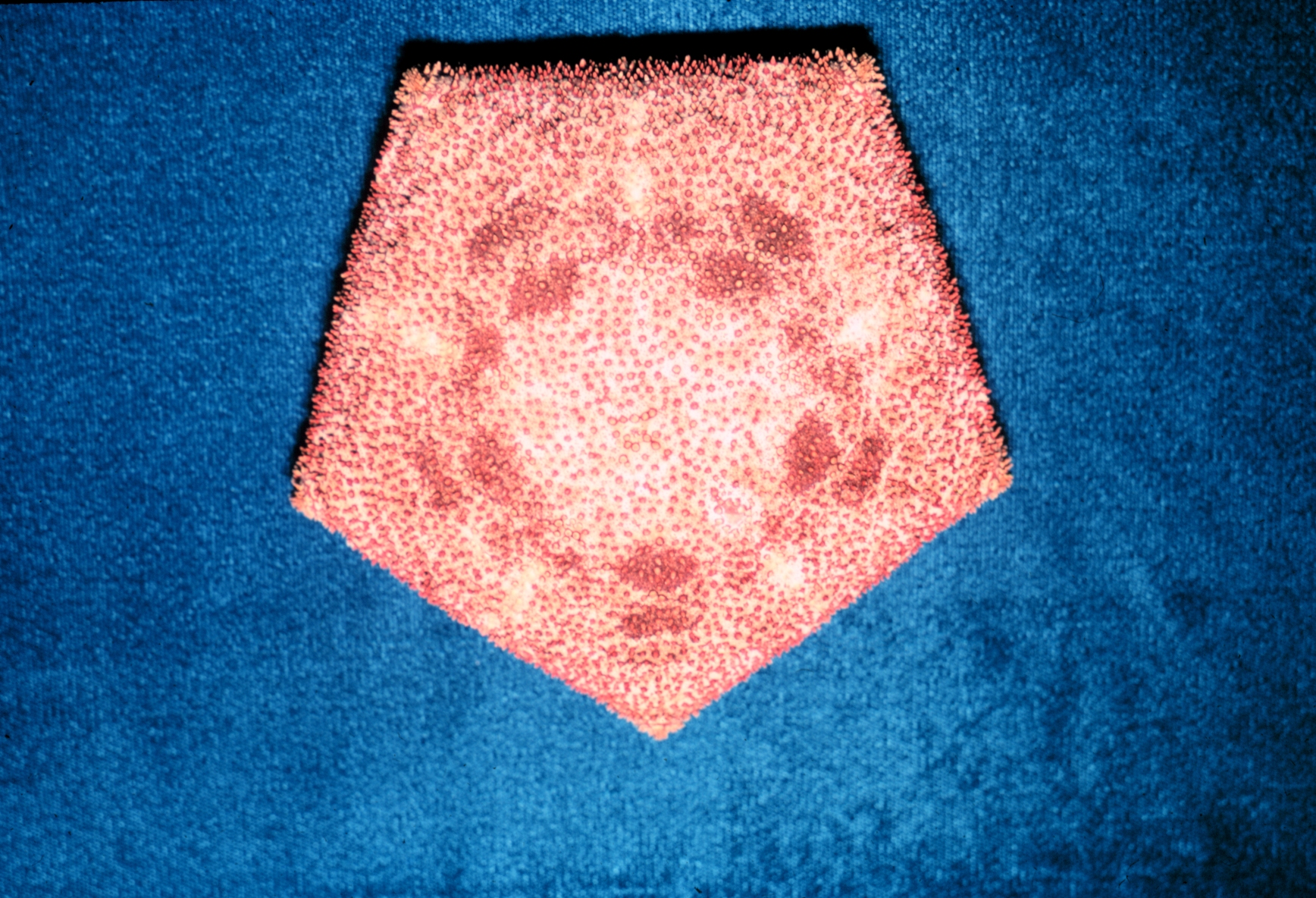
A young specimen, still rather flattened

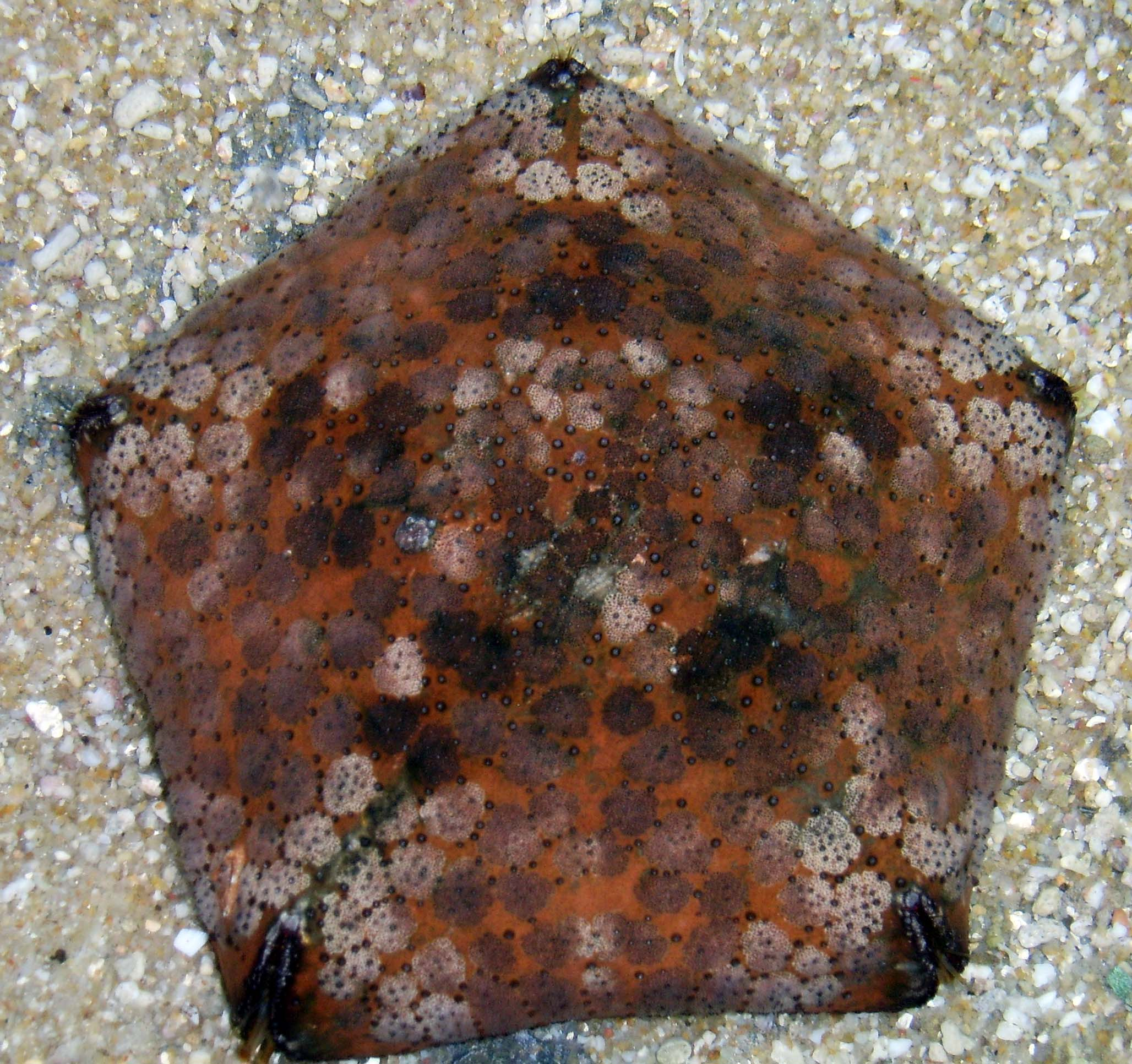
A slightly older one

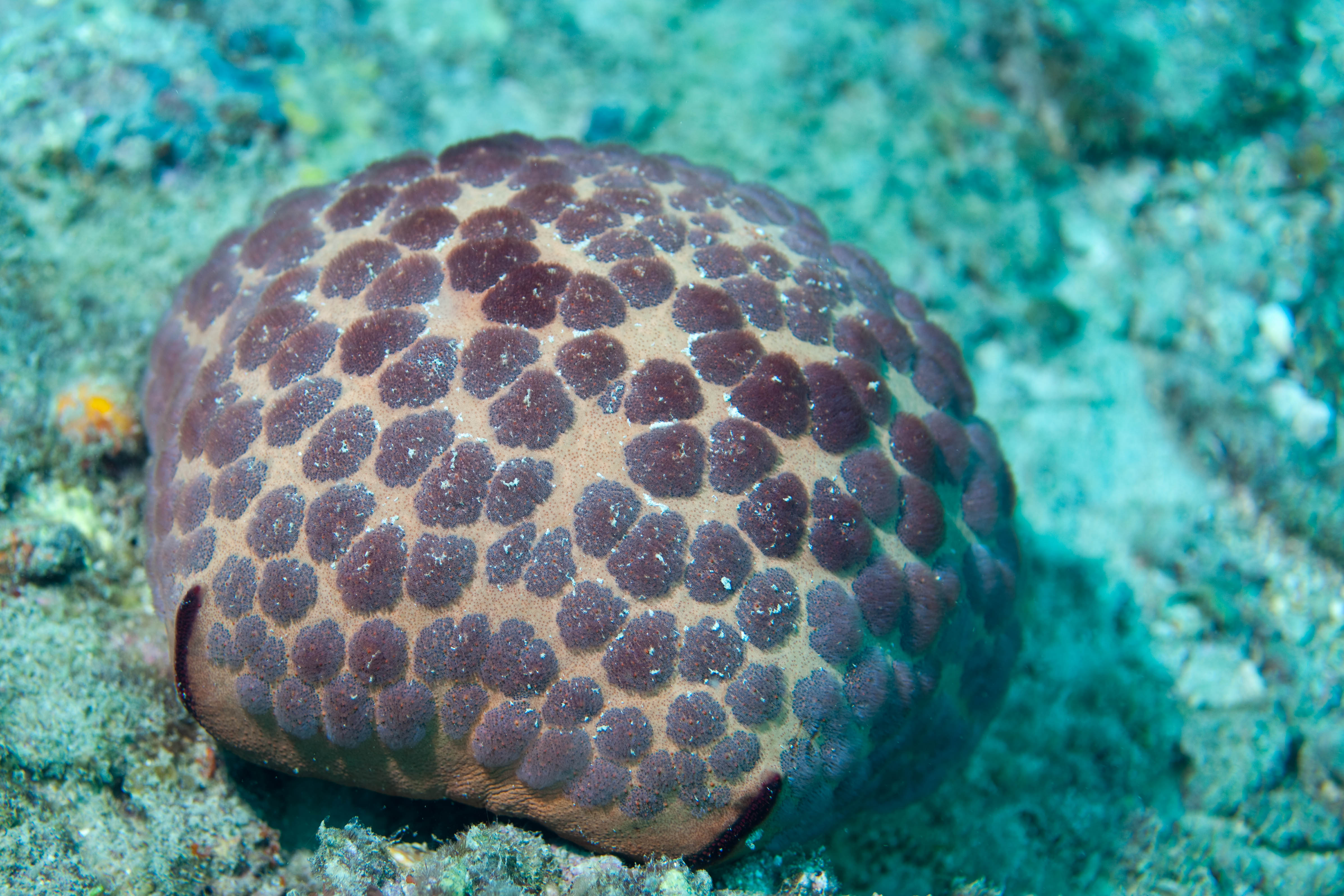
Mature specimen

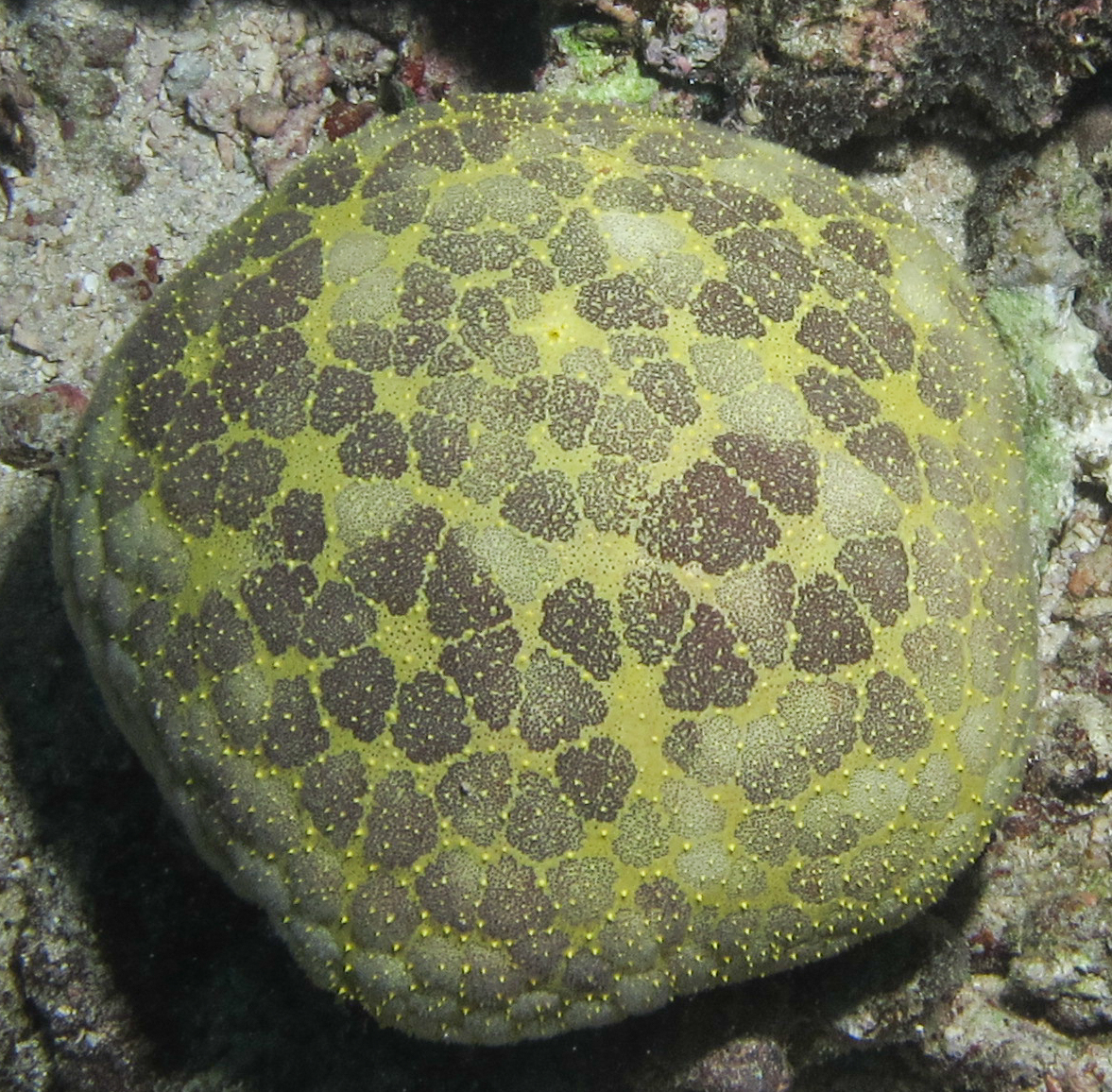
A very spiny specimen from Fiji

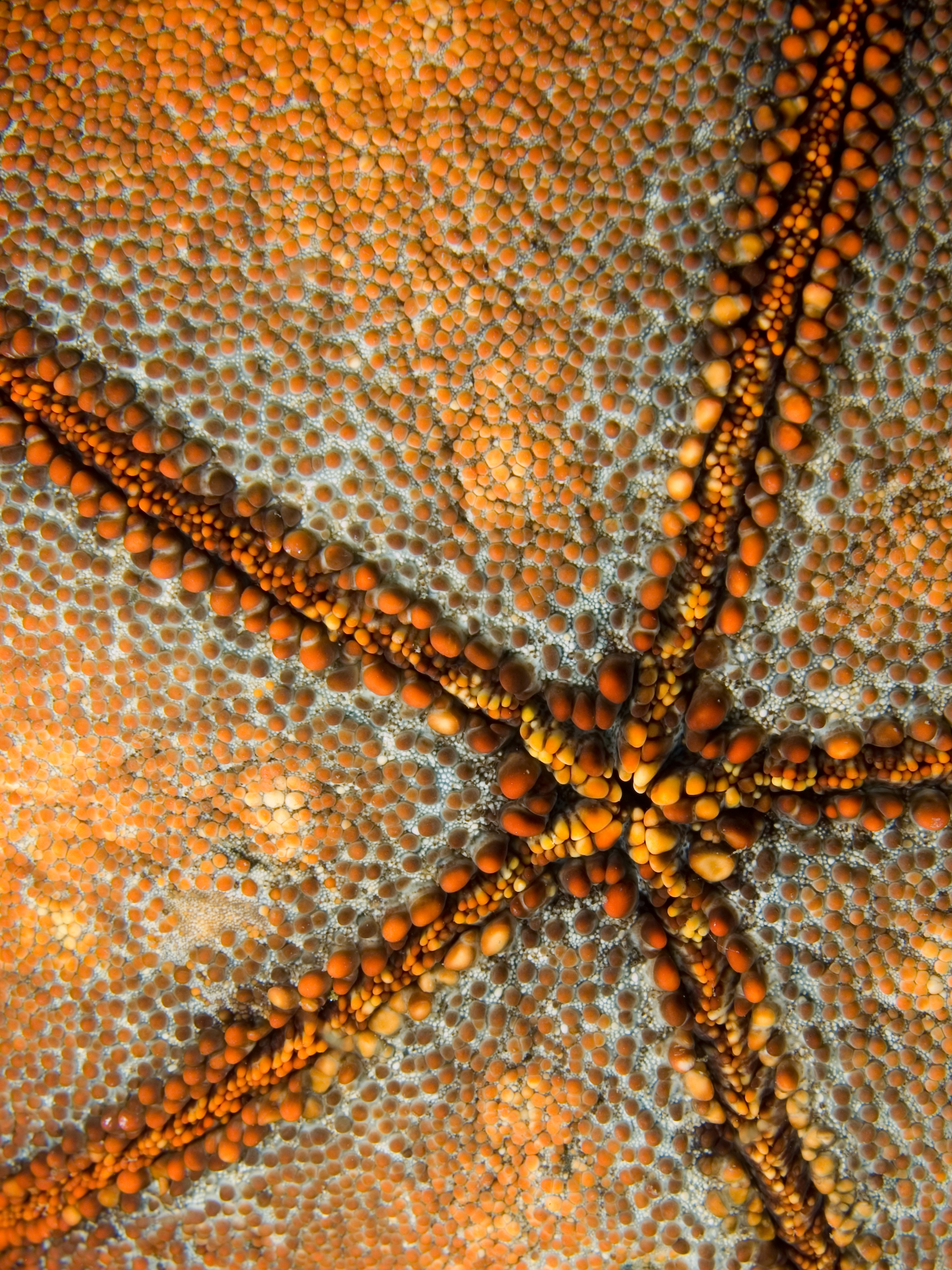
Oral face

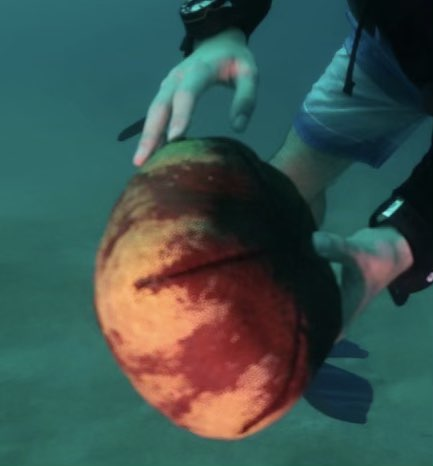
A specimen from Guam

== Distribution ==
Culcita novaeguineae is found in the Indian and Pacific Oceans. Its range extends from Madagascar and the Seychelles to the Philippines, New Guinea (for which it is named), Australia and Hawaii.

== Biology ==
Culcita novaeguineae feeds on detritus and small invertebrates, including stony corals. It can be kept in a reef aquarium of sufficient size stocked with suitable corals on which it can feed.

== Ecology ==
A number of organisms live in or on C. novaeguineae. The small shrimp Periclimenes soror lives as a commensal hiding under the cushion star. Astroxynus culcitae, Stellicola oreastriphilus and Stellicola parvulipes are copepods which live parasitically on the outside of the cushion star. The star pearlfish (Carapus mourlani) sometimes lives as a commensal inside the cushion star, working its way into the large body cavity through an ambulacral groove and emerging periodically to feed.

== Synonyms ==
- Anthenea spinulosa (Gray, 1847)
- Culcita grex Müller & Troschel, 1842
- Culcita pentagularis Gray, 1847
- Culcita pentangularis Gray, 1847
- Culcita pulverulenta Perrier, 1869
- Goniaster multiporum Hoffman in Rowe, 1974
- Goniaster sebae (Muller & Troschel, 1842)
- Goniodiscides sebae (Müller & Troschel, 1842)
- Goniodiscus sebae Müller & Troschel, 1842
- Hippasteria philippinensis Domantay & Roxas, 1938
- Hosia spinulosa Gray, 1847
- Pentagonaster spinulosus (Gray, 1847)
- Randasia granulata Gray, 1847
