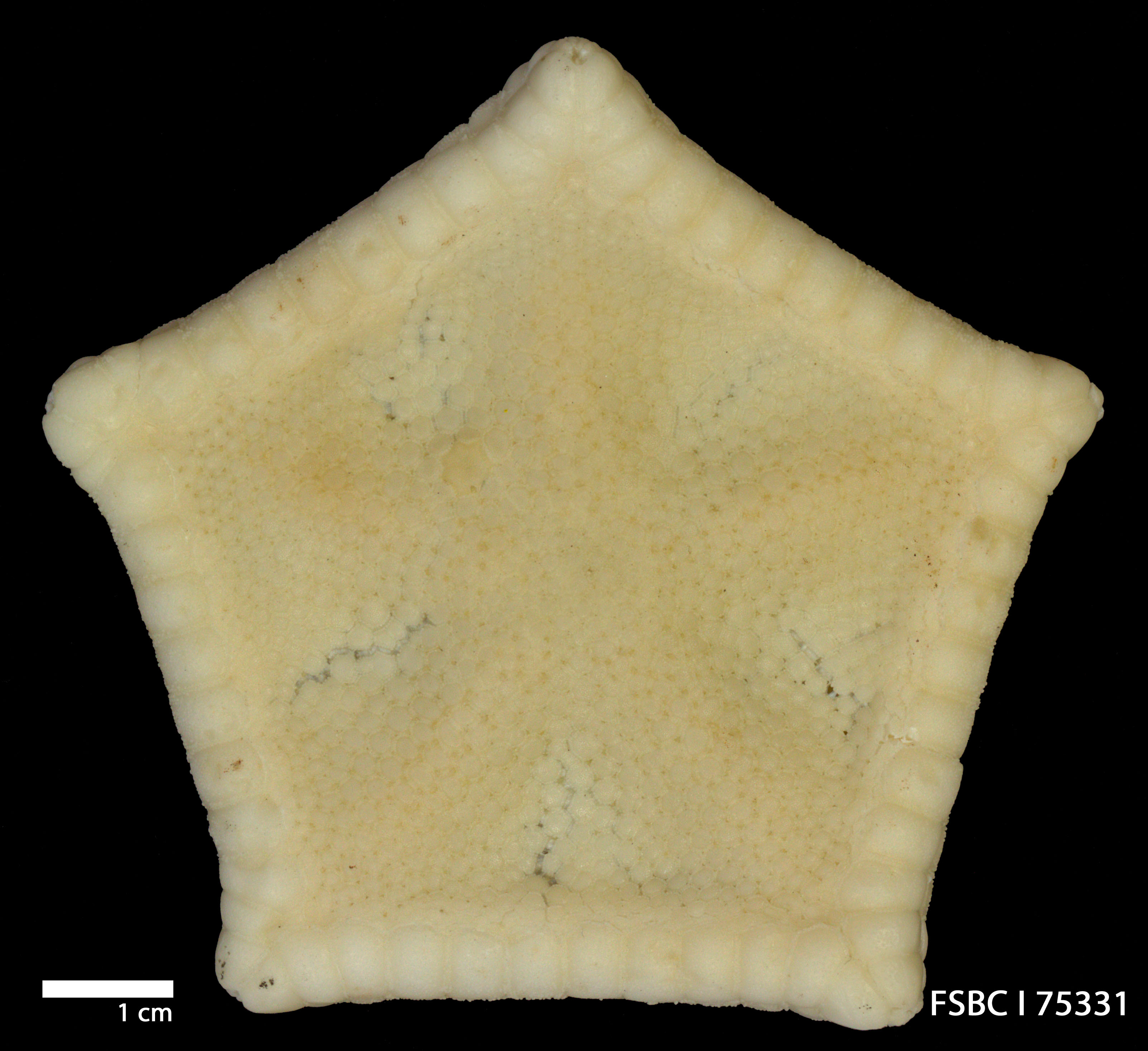
- Peltaster placenta

Scientific classification
- Kingdom: Animalia
- Phylum: Echinodermata
- Class: Asteroidea
- Order: Valvatida
- Family: Goniasteridae
- Genus: Peltaster; Verrill, 1899

= Peltaster =

Genus of starfishes

Peltaster is a genus of echinoderms belonging to the family Goniasteridae.

The genus has almost cosmopolitan distribution.

Species:

- Peltaster cycloplax Fisher, 1913
- Peltaster micropeltus (Fisher, 1906)
- Peltaster placenta (Müller & Troschel, 1842)
