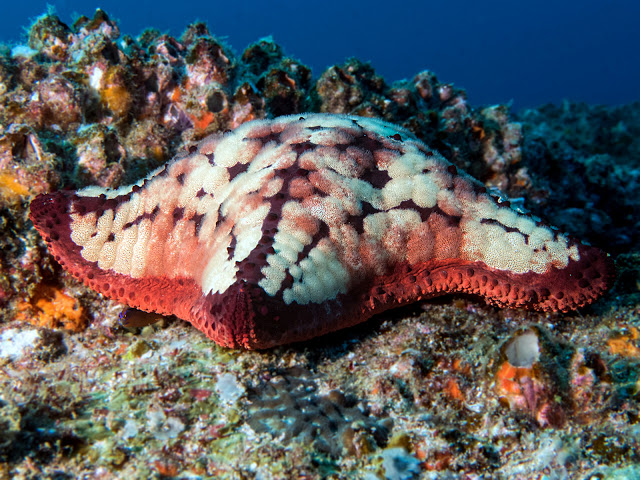

Scientific classification
- Kingdom: Animalia
- Phylum: Echinodermata
- Class: Asteroidea
- Order: Valvatida
- Family: Oreasteridae
- Genus: Culcita
- Species: C. coriacea

Binomial name
- Culcita coriacea Müller & Troschel, 1842

= Culcita coriacea =

Species of starfish

Culcita coriacea, commonly known as the Arabian cushion star, is a species of pin-cushion star.

== Description ==
Culcita coriacea is a roughly pentagonal starfish with a leathery surface and an inflated appearance. It is subpentagonal in shape with a very convex aboral (upper) surface and flat base. Its arms are stout and short, but more obvious than in the other species of this genus.

This starfish varies in color but often has a dark background with small colored patches.

== Distribution and habitat ==
Culcita coriacea is endemic to the Arabian region, in particular the Red Sea and the region of Oman. It is found in lagoon areas and on inner reef flats with seagrasses and among algae at depths down to about 92 m (302 ft).

== Behaviour ==
Culcita coriacea feeds mainly on the epibenthic film of organic detritus and micro-organisms growing on algae and sea grasses.
