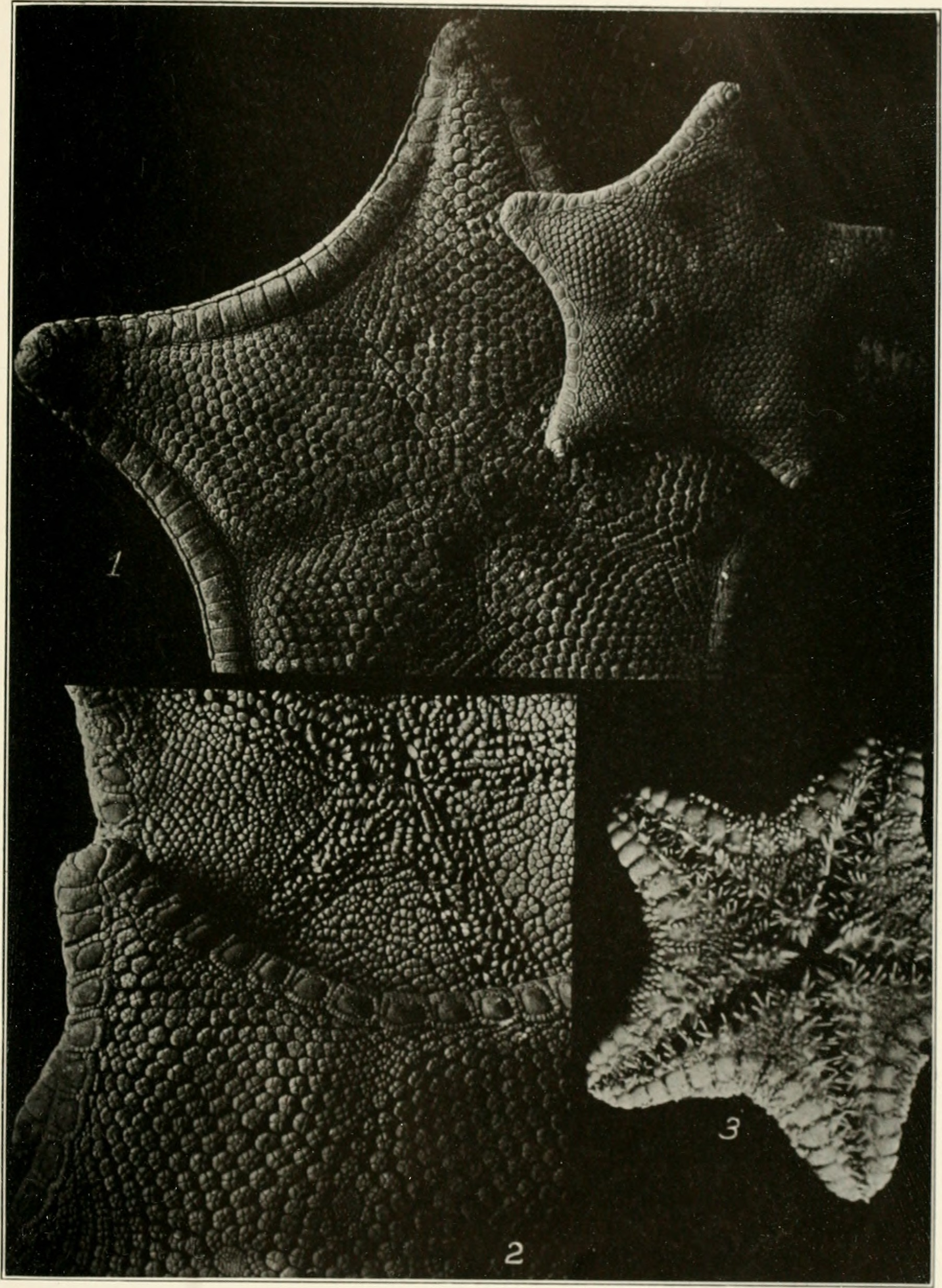
- Ceramaster arcticus (1 and 2) and Pseudarchaster parelii alascensis (3)

Scientific classification
- Kingdom: Animalia
- Phylum: Echinodermata
- Class: Asteroidea
- Order: Valvatida
- Family: Goniasteridae
- Genus: Ceramaster
- Species: C. arcticus

Binomial name
- Ceramaster arcticus (Verrill, 1907)

= Ceramaster arcticus =

Species of starfish

Ceramaster arcticus, the Arctic cookie star, is a species of sea star. It is pink and often has dark red accents. It has broad arms, no spines, and no pincers, or pedicellariae. It is considered rare and only inhabits the Pacific Ocean off the coast of northwestern North America.

== Description ==
A member of the sea star genus Ceramaster (often referred to as cushion stars), the Arctic cookie star is broadly pentagonal, rigid, and like other Ceramaster species, has no arms. The species' aboral surface (i.e., the top of the sea star) has small flat-topped plates. Growing up to 11 cm across (4.2 inches), it is pink and often has red accents. The species preys on sponges.

The species is similar to the more common cookie star (Ceramaster patagonicus).

== Distribution ==
The species inhabits the Pacific Ocean off the northwestern coast (intertidal zone) to a depth of 186 meters (610 feet)) of North America, ranging from the Aleutian Islands to the north to the Strait of Juan de Fuca to the south. While rare, according to Sea Stars of the Pacific Northwest, the species is more abundant in the northern portion of its range.
