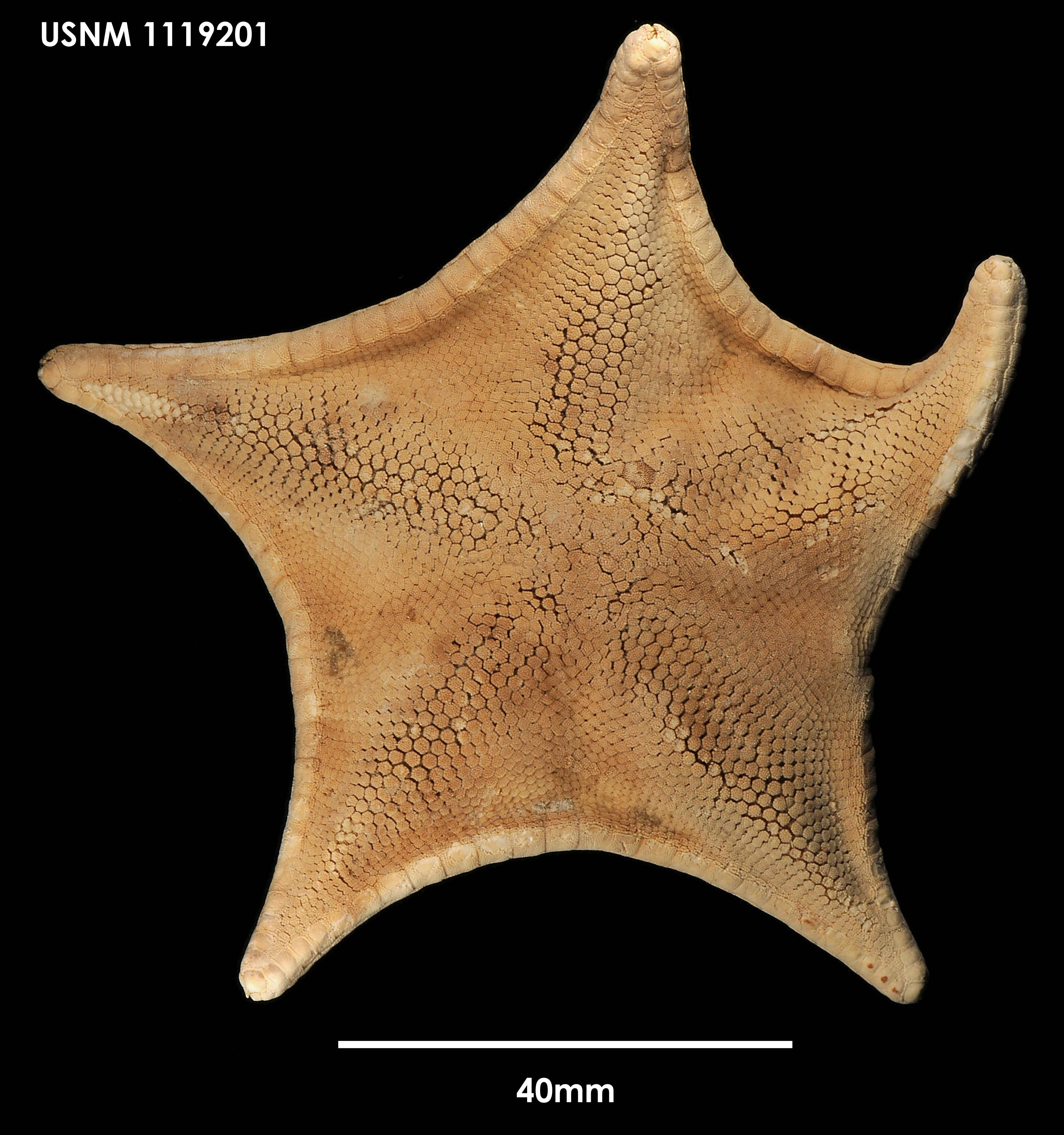
- Preserved specimen of Ceramaster patagonicus

Scientific classification
- Kingdom: Animalia
- Phylum: Echinodermata
- Class: Asteroidea
- Order: Valvatida
- Family: Goniasteridae
- Genus: Ceramaster
- Species: C. patagonicus

Binomial name
- Ceramaster patagonicus (Sladen, 1889)

= Ceramaster patagonicus =

Species of starfish

Ceramaster patagonicus, the cookie star, is a species of sea star. It is bright orange or yellow in colour. Its arms are short and it has no spines. It is a deep water species and lives on rocky sea beds. Its diet includes sponges.

== Subspecies ==
The World Register of Marine Species lists four subspecies:

- Ceramaster patagonicus euryplax H.L. Clark, 1923
- Ceramaster patagonicus fisheri Bernasconi, 1963
- Ceramaster patagonicus patagonicus (Sladen, 1889)
- Ceramaster patagonicus productus Djakonov, 1950

== Description ==
The cookie star is roughly pentagonal in shape with a diameter of up to 16 centimetres (6.3 in). It has a slightly inflated, broad central disc and five short rays. The aboral (upper) surface is covered with neatly arranged flat-topped scales, polygonal in the central area and hexagonal on the rays. Between the rays the scales are small and crowded together. There is a marginal row of distinctive larger scales forming a bevelled edge. Sometimes the disc and ray areas are swollen with sunken inter-radial areas between. This may happen when the starfish has recently fed or when its gonads are enlarged prior to spawning. The general colour is yellow, orange or pink. It is larger than the rather similar Arctic cookie star (Ceramaster arcticus) and does not have red patches on the aboral surface as that species often has.

== Distribution ==
The cookie star is found in the Southern Ocean, the Strait of Magellan and in Australian and New Zealand waters. It is also found on the west coast of North and South America from Alaska southwards to Cape Horn. It is a deep water species, in the Southern Ocean being found at depths varying between 100 and 5,000 metres (330 and 16,400 ft) but is commonest at depths less than 250 metres (820 ft).

== Biology ==
The cookie star feeds on sponges such as the cloud sponge (Aphrocallistes vastus ) and the chocolate puffball sponge (Latrunculia austini). The Morning sun star (Solaster dawsoni) is a predatory starfish that feeds on other starfish. If approached by a morning sun star, a cookie star does not attempt to flee, although this would be a pointless strategy as the cookie star is a very slow crawler. The morning sun star climbs on top in its usual attacking position but soon gives up and looks very sick, apparently repelled by a toxic chemical substance. In an experiment, four cookie stars were kept in a tank with a number of hungry morning sun stars for a period of two months, but none were harmed.
