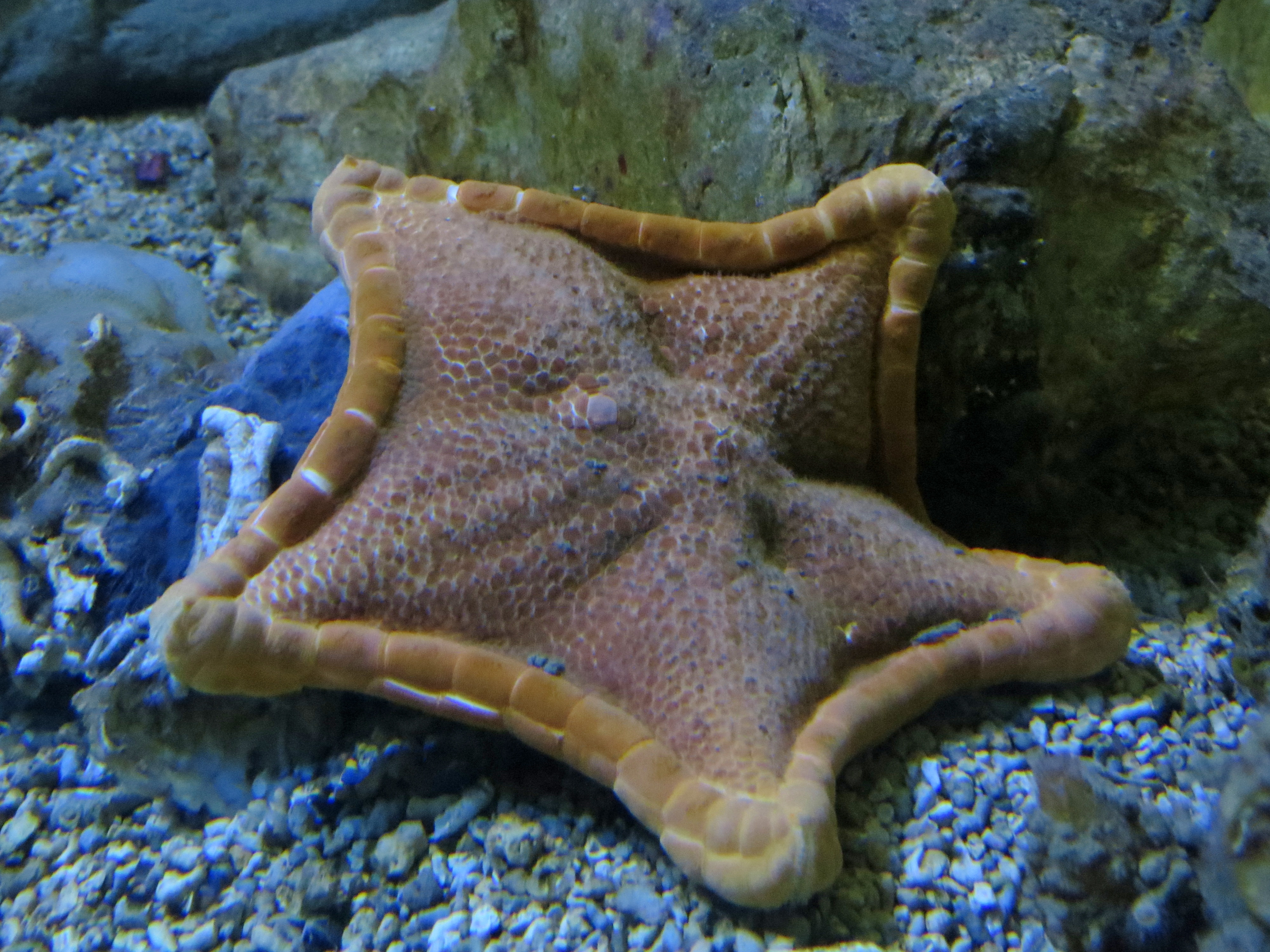
- Peltaster placenta specimen from Banyuls-sur-Mer

Scientific classification
- Kingdom: Animalia
- Phylum: Echinodermata
- Class: Asteroidea
- Order: Valvatida
- Family: Goniasteridae
- Genus: Peltaster
- Species: P. placenta

Binomial name
- Peltaster placenta (Müller & Troschel, 1842)

= Peltaster placenta =

Species of echinoderm

Peltaster placenta is a goniasterid starfish, living primarily in deep sea environments, as similar to most goniasterids. The sea star has a wide distribution throughout the Atlantic Ocean and Mediterranean Sea in a wide variety of coral habitats. The first description of Peltaster placenta was in 1843 by Dr. Müller and Dr. Franz Herrmann Troschel. There is still much unknown about the Peltaster placenta in terms of behavior, feeding, evolution, and reproduction, however the sea star’s body plan is fairly well documented.

== Initial description ==
Originally described in 1842 by Dr. Tohannes Müller and Dr. Franz Herrmann Troschel. First reported that the initial size was 6 inches with an unknown locality.

== Characteristics and features ==
The general form of Peltaster placenta is pentagonal to arcuate pentagonal with five arms with a very large, flat disk. The dorsal surface of the sea star is a pale orange color and the underside of the seastar is a cream color. The sea star can grow to a size of at least 90 mm.

The abactinal plates, or the skeletal plates on the upper surface of a sea star, are arranged in a regular series which runs parallel to the carinal plates, or the central row of plates running down the middle of each arm. The primary abactinal plates are flat and slightly irregularly round and are covered in 25 to 30 peripheral and 40 to 50 central granules on the larger plates. The abactinal surface extends to the terminal plate, the plate at the very tip of each arm.The secondary abactinal plates are present in the radial areas and the small center of the disk. These plates are covered by rounded granules similar to those found on the primary abactinals. These plates have around ten peripheral granules and four central granules. The interradial areas are triangular shaped and narrow and the interradial plates are larger and polygonal in shape.

The regions that contain paupula cover a large portion of the body. There are papula located on the central body of the sea star and along the arms. The only location without papula are the narrow inter-radial areas.

The actinal plates, or the plates on the underside of the sea star, are small, thick and diamond shaped. These plates are covered in large dome shaped granules, which are crowded closely. Some have tiny pincer-like structures known as pedicellariae. The ambulacral plates, or the plates located right next to the groove where the tube feet are located, are smaller than the actinal plates. The rows of spines behind the groove are utilized for movement and protection, with 3-4 spines in each row.

Each mouth plate contains seven to nine furrow spines. The sea star's anus is subcentral and is encircled by big pentagonal plates. The sea star's madreporite plate, or the special plate that lets water into the sea star’s water vascular system, is round and large. The sea star’s gonads are large and thick and clustered in tufts on both sides of the membranous interbranchial septum.

== Habitat ==
Peltaster placenta is found in the Atlantic Ocean and the Mediterranean Sea and is associated with a wide array of coral habitats. Peltaster placenta is found anywhere between 10-695 meters of depth. The sea star occurs in both bathyal rock and mosaic habitats, but is predominantly associated with hard substrate as a microhabitat. It is associated with marine environments, with Peltaster placenta found in environments with salinities ranging from 30-40 PSU. The Atlantic range ranges from both the Eastern and the Western Atlantic. In the eastern Atlantic, Peltaster placenta has been found along the Western coast of Africa as far south as the equator, the Bay of Biscay. In the western Atlantic, the sea star has been found along almost the entire coast of North America ranging from Massachusetts to Southern Florida, as well as the Caribbean. In the Mediterranean, particularly high abundances of Peltaster placenta has been found in Malta Graben, to the west of the Maltese Islands. High abundances of Peltaster placenta have also been found in the Gulf of Naples and the Adriatic Sea. The sea star has been known to associate in communities with other species of non-closely related sea stars.

== Feeding ==
Recent research indicates feeding events on Parantipathes larix coral colonies in deep sea environments. It is suspected that the sea star feeds by engulfing coral pinnules.

This is inferred as black coral skeletons have been found after feeding events with the grazed portions, including main stem and the first series of basal pinnules intact but completely deprived of the coenenchyme (gelatinous, living tissue that surrounds and connects individual polyps within a colonial anthozoan) and showed the black chitinous axis that is normally underneath. Some studies suggest species-specific feeding with only one species of black coral (Parantipathes larix) found to be preyed upon in deep coral forests. Peltaster placenta has also been observed on white coral colonies, but no studies have yet examined its feeding habits on white coral colonies.

== Reproduction ==
The reproductive biology of Peltaster placenta remains poorly documented. However, based on its morphology and comparison with other Asteroideae it is likely a gonochoric broadcast spawner with external fertilization and planktonic larval development.
