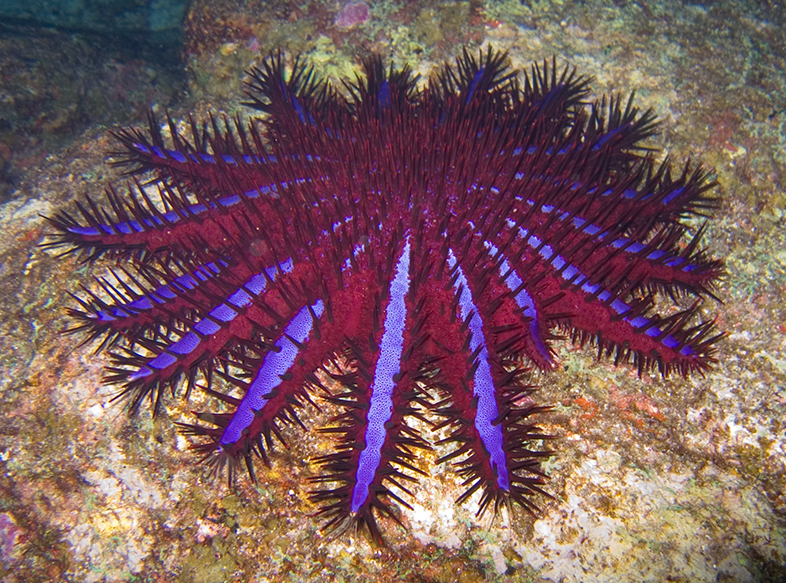
- Acanthaster planci

Scientific classification
- Kingdom: Animalia
- Phylum: Echinodermata
- Class: Asteroidea
- Order: Valvatida
- Family: Acanthasteridae
- Genus: Acanthaster; Gervais, 1841

Species
- A. benziei (Wörheide, Kaltenbacher, Cowan & Haszprunar, 2022); A. brevispinus (Fisher, 1917); A. mauritiensis (de Loriol, 1885); A. planci (Linnaeus, 1758)

Synonyms
- Echinaster Gray, 1840; Echinities Müller & Troschel, 1844

= Acanthaster =

Genus of starfishes

Acanthaster is a genus of large and venomous starfish placed in the monotypic family, Acanthasteridae. Its members are known as crown-of-thorns starfish. Acanthaster species are corallivores and hence pose a significant threat to coral reefs, especially in the Indo-Pacific region, thereby intensifying the coral reefs crisis.

== Name ==
The name Acanthaster comes from either Ancient Greek: ἄκανθα (ákantha), meaning "spine, thorn", and ἀστήρ (astḗr), meaning "star" or from Latin: Acanth + aster (literally, thorny star). The genus has been known as different names in scientific literature due to confusion from the outset. Names used for the genus included Echinaster (Gray, 1840) and Echinites (Müller & Troschel, 1844), before settling on Acanthaster (Gervais 1841).

== Taxonomy ==
Up until late 2010s, only two species, Acanthaster planci (Linnaeus, 1758) and Acanthaster brevispinus (Fisher, 1917) were accepted within the genus. Historical observations of various morphologically different specimens from different geographical locations failed to conclusively define new taxa, and proposed taxa were subsequently merged with the most abundant species, A. planci. Thus, the crown-of-thorns starfish throughout the Indo-Pacific was considered a single species.

A thorough molecular and phylogeographic study carried out in 2008 of A. planci specimens collected from the entirety of its Indo-Pacific distribution range (from the Red Sea to Mauritius and the Eastern Pacific) highlighted four divergent clades. Analysis showed a high inter-clade divergence (8.8–10.6%) compared to <0.7% intra-clade divergence, suggesting that A. planci rather represented a species complex with four distinct species. However, the four species were not correlated with any Linnean taxon names by the researchers and this caused further delay in establishment of the species of this genus.

In 2014, a nomenclatorial study set available names for two of the four species, these being A. planci and Acanthaster mauritiensis (de Loriol, 1885). The third species has been proposed as Acanthaster solaris (Schreber, 1795) (Acanthaster cf. solaris) but as of 2026 has not been accepted as a distinct species and is taxonomically accepted as A. planci. The fourth species, the one from the Red Sea, was not yet named as it required additional taxonomic work and analyses. It was formally described and accepted as Acanthaster benziei in 2022. Some researchers have proposed Acanthaster ellisii (Gray, 1840) (Acanthaster cf. ellisii) in the Eastern Pacific, but it is currently considered as a subspecies of A. planci.

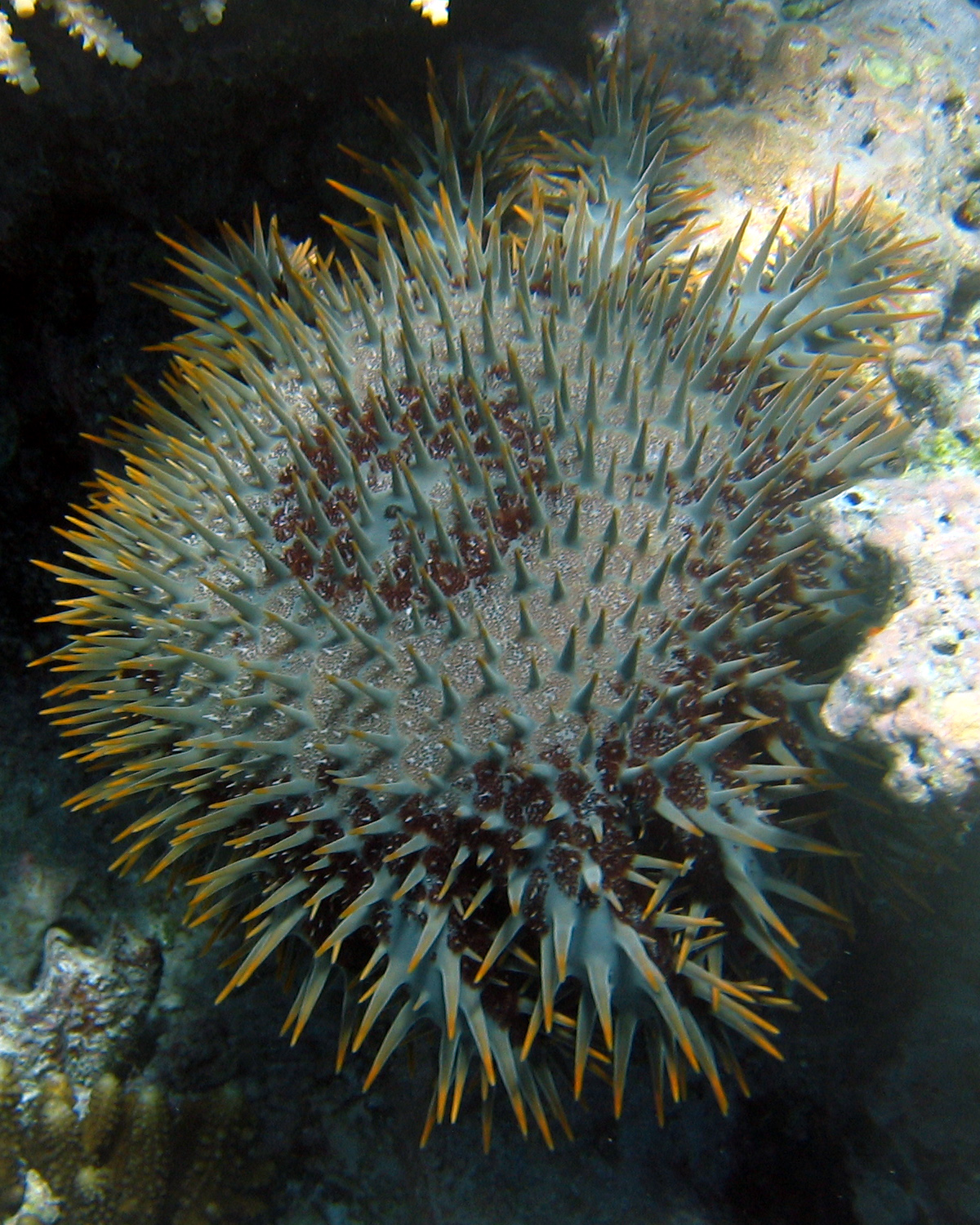
A. cf. solaris

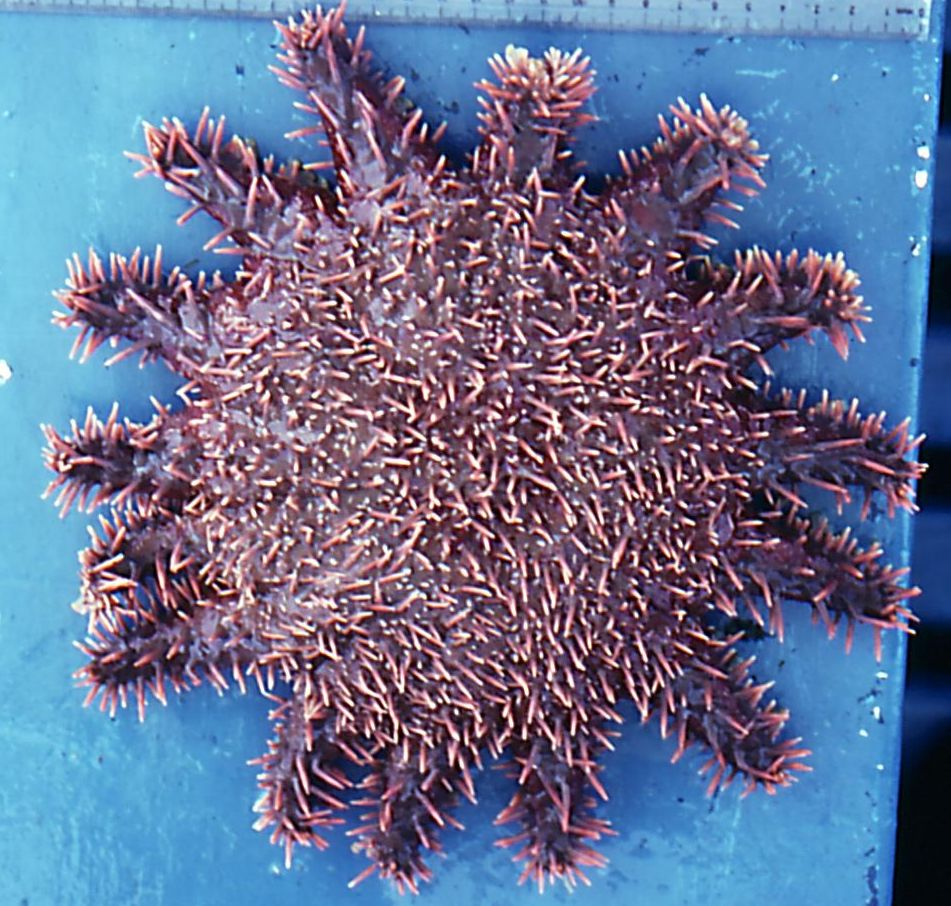
A. cf. ellisii

Wörheide et al. (2022) constructed the following Cytochrome c oxidase subunit I maximum likelihood (COI ML) tree of the Indo-Pacific A. planci species complex based on the haplotype alignment of Vogler et al. (2008) combined with full mitochondrial genome sequences from Yuasa et al. (2021) and four sequences of the type series of A. benziei. The tree was rooted with A. brevispinus and highlighted the deep divergence among, and little diversity within the species/geographic clades.

- - - Acanthaster cf. solaris
      (Pacific Ocean)
    - - Acanthaster planci
        (Northern Indian Ocean)
      - Acanthaster mauritiensis
        (Southern Indian Ocean)
  - Acanthaster benziei
    (Red Sea)
- Acanthaster brevispinus

Acanthaster Gervais, 1841
Image	Scientific name	Distribution	Max. number of arms	Specific color	Harmfulness to humans	IUCN status
	Acanthaster benziei (Wörheide, Kaltenbacher, Cowan & Haszprunar, 2022)	Red Sea	14	gray-green to gray-purple, bulls-eye appearance	less harmful	
	Acanthaster brevispinus (Fisher, 1917)	Western Pacific Ocean, Western Indian Ocean		purple, reddish-brown		
	Acanthaster mauritiensis (de Loriol, 1885)	Southern Indian Ocean (except West Australian coast)	23	light blue to rusty	harmful	
	Acanthaster planci (Linnaeus, 1758)	Indo-Pacific, Northern Indian Ocean	23	purple, purple-blue, reddish-grey, brown-red, green-yellow, "electric-blue"	harmful	

=== Hybrids ===
In 1973, Lucas and Jones conducted a hybridization experiment to investigate genetic relatedness between A. brevispinus and A. planci. Specimens of A. brevispinus were obtained by trawling in December of that year, near the approximate time of annual gamete release by A. planci in Great Barrier Reef waters. The A brevispinus had ripe gonads and it was possible to dissect out gonad tissue without killing the starfish and thus obtain mature eggs (oocytes) and sperm. Mature eggs and sperm were also obtained from A. planci. Eggs were fertilized in vitro with sperm. Four groups of larvae resulting from the fertilizations were reared, i.e. larvae of each species and reciprocal crosses. The A. planci eggs fertilized by A. brevispinus sperm will be referred to subsequently as A. planci hybrids and correspondingly A. brevispinus hybrids, according to the source of eggs.

== Distribution and Diet ==
The members of the genus are restricted to tropical seas where they inhabit coral reefs, usually in the littoral zone. However, A. brevispinus has been recorded in deeper waters. A. brevispinus, A. mauritiensis and A. planci have all been documented in various regions of the Indian and the Pacific oceans. A. benziei is confined to the Red Sea.

The species are voracious feeders of coral polyps and hence are a contributor to coral reef degradation as they prey on a large amount of live coral at high density. A. planci in the Great Barrier Reef is known to eat up to 10 square metres of coral per year. A. brevispinus was previously thought to be a non-corallivore, until a 2023 report documented the species being a predator of coral reefs as well.
