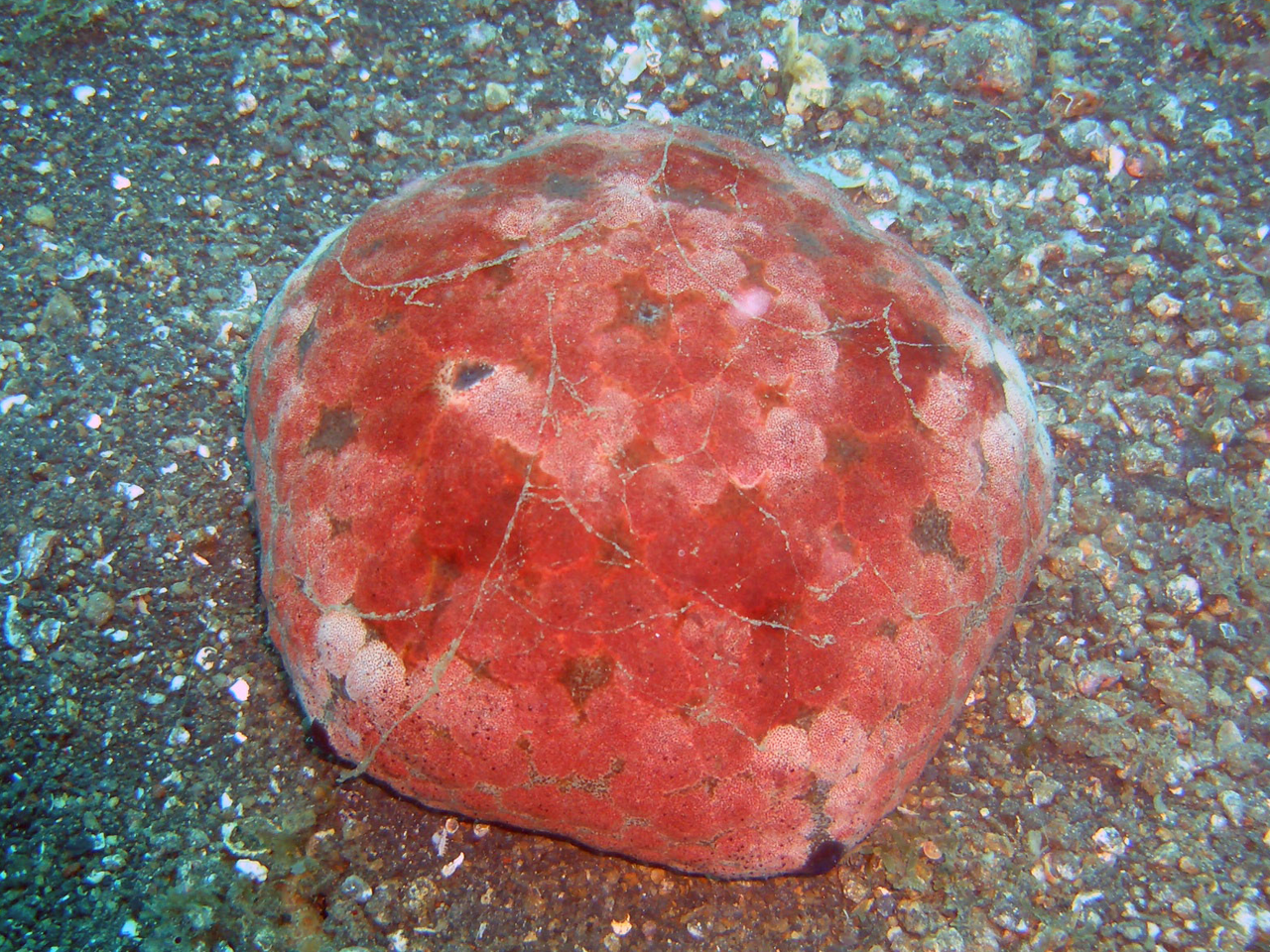
- Culcita novaeguineae

Scientific classification
- Kingdom: Animalia
- Phylum: Echinodermata
- Class: Asteroidea
- Order: Valvatida
- Family: Oreasteridae
- Genus: Culcita; Agassiz, 1836

= Culcita (echinoderm) =

Genus of starfishes

Culcita is a genus of sea stars. They are found in tropical waters. Some are kept in home aquariums.

== Description and characteristics ==
These are very particular stars, plump and pillow-shaped, more or less pentagonal. Their five arms have waned to only obtuse angles (and sometimes rounded off or truncated). They can measure up to 30 cm in diameter, and are typical of Indo-Pacific coral reefs, where they feed on benthic invertebrates and coral.

Two species Culcita novaeguineae and Culcita schmideliana are extremely similar and almost impossible to differentiate by sight, except that C. schmideliana has larger tubercles, that are normally absent from papular areas (though both species can also be naked). They are thus distinguished mostly by their area of distribution: C. schmideliana lives in the Indian Ocean (from Africa to the Maldives), and C. novaeguineae in Oceania and the Pacific Ocean. The third species, C. coriacea, lives in the Red Sea and around Arabia, and is slightly different in appearance.

This genus is not to be confused with similar cushion-shaped species such as Halityle regularis.

The juveniles are flat and pentagonal, and can look like "biscuit sea stars" from the family Goniasteridae (such as Peltaster spp.).

== List of species ==
The genus contains three species:

- Culcita coriacea Müller & Troschel, 1842 -- Red Sea and Arabic region
- Culcita novaeguineae Müller & Troschel, 1842 -- Indonesian region and Pacific Ocean
- Culcita schmideliana (Retzius, 1805) -- Indian Ocean
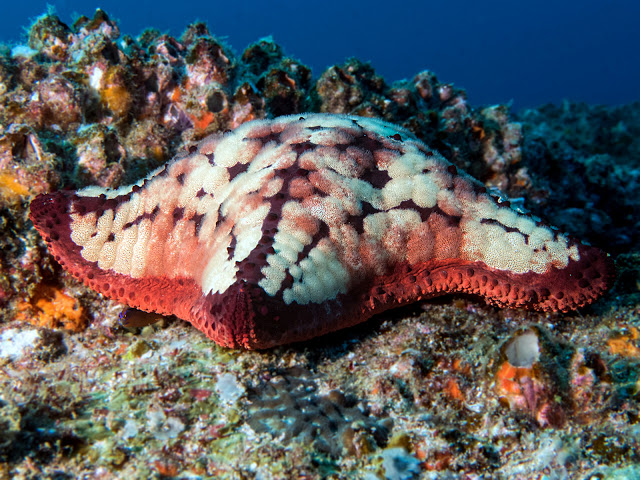
Culcita coriacea (Oman)

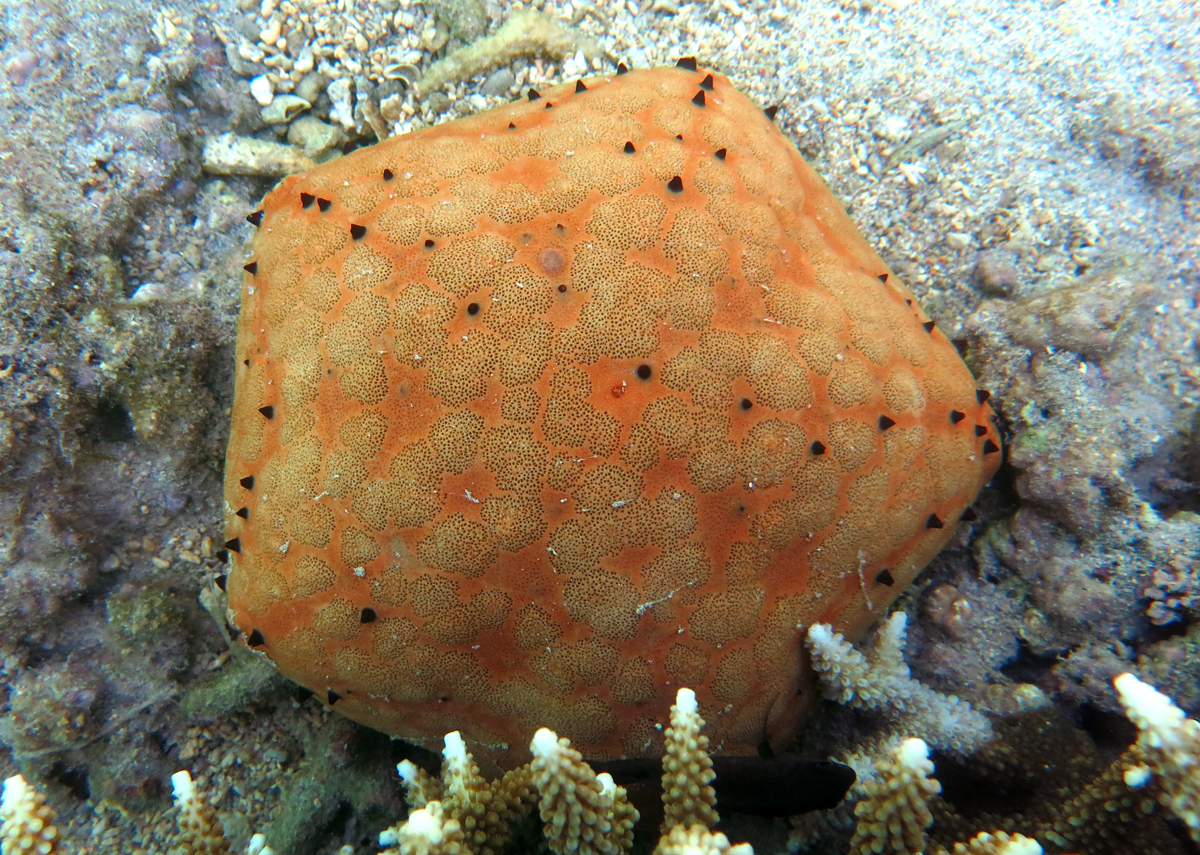
Culcita schmideliana (la Réunion)

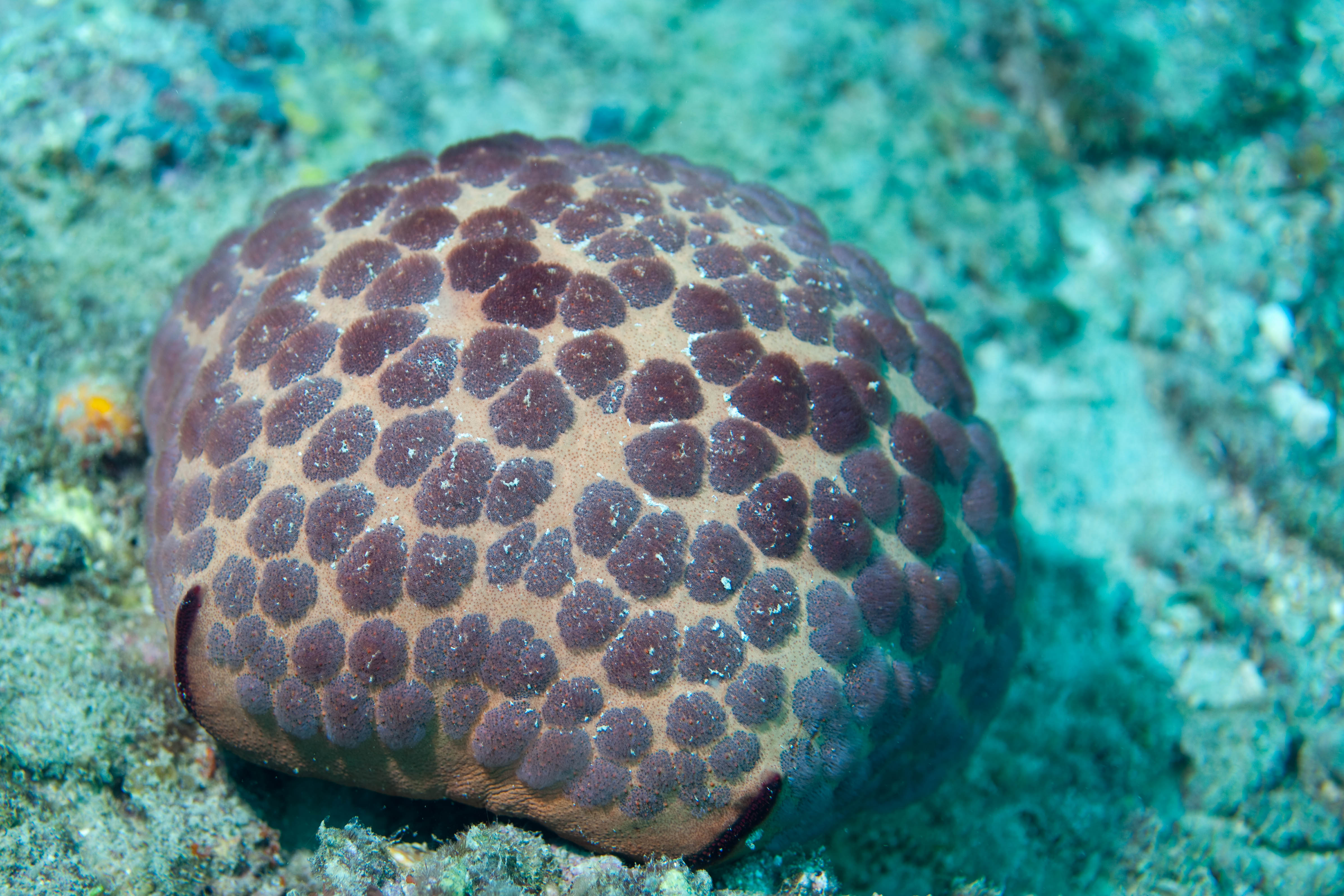
Culcita novaeguineae (Malaysia)

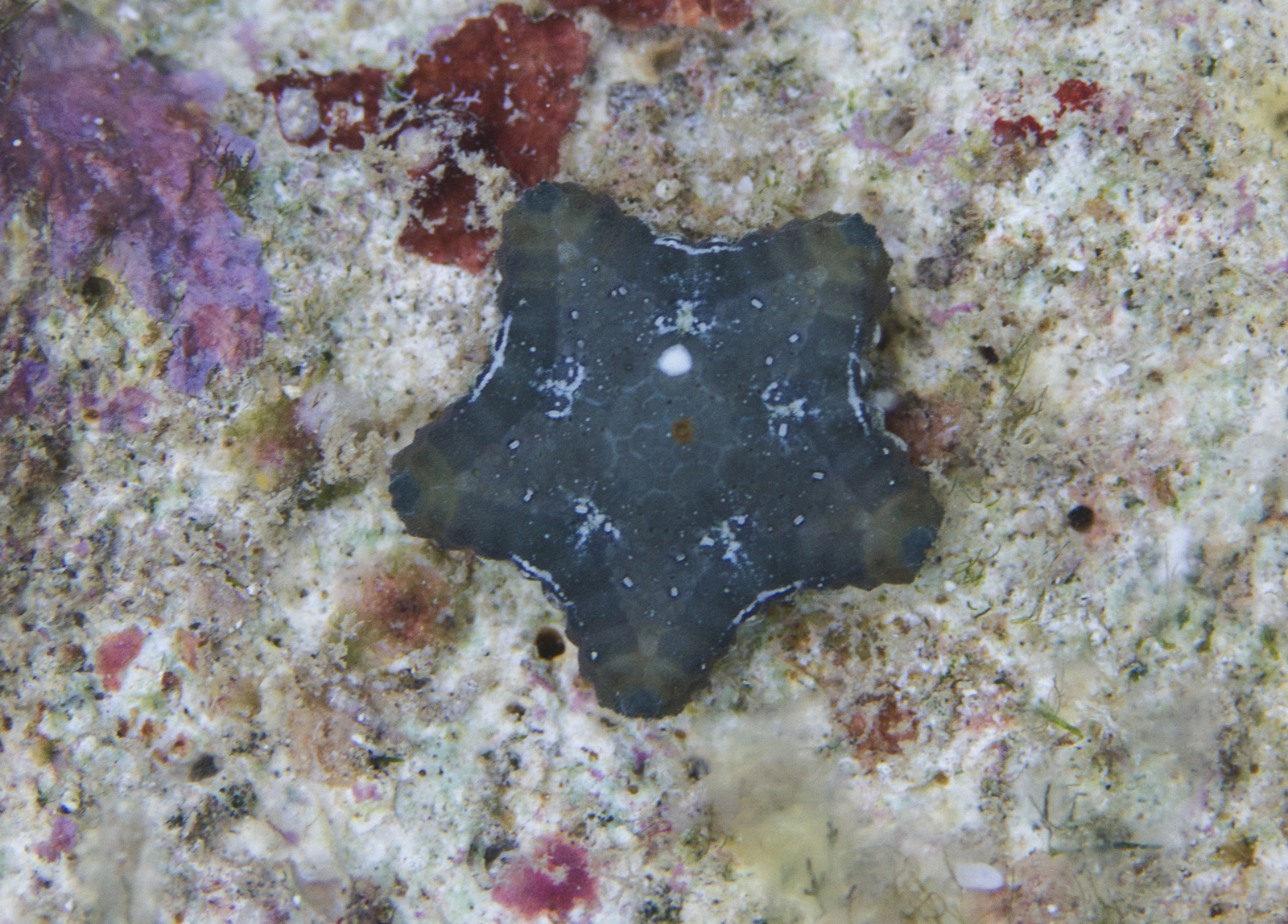
Juveniles are flat and pentagonal

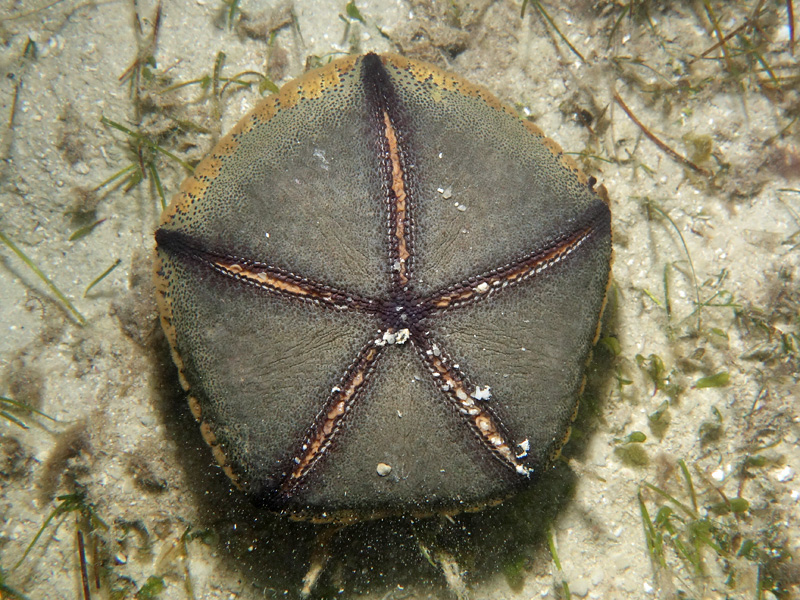
Oral face (the mouth is at the center)
