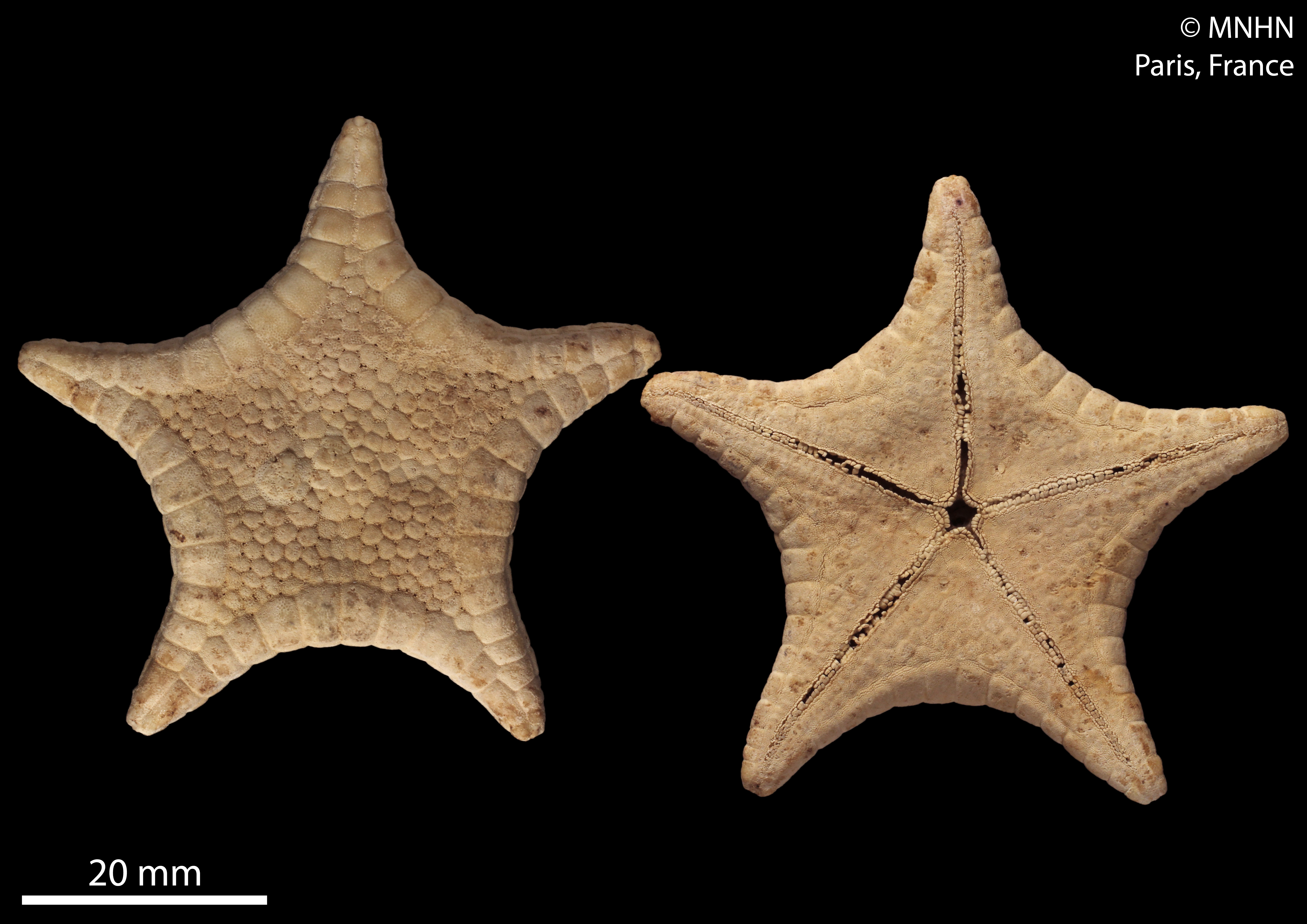
- Kanakaster solidus

Scientific classification
- Kingdom: Animalia
- Phylum: Echinodermata
- Class: Asteroidea
- Order: Valvatida
- Family: Goniasteridae
- Subfamily: Ferdininae
- Genus: Kanakaster; Mah, 2017

= Kanakaster =

Genus of starfishes

Kanakaster is a genus of echinoderms belonging to the family Goniasteridae.

The species of this genus are found in Australia and East Africa.

== Species ==
Species include:

- Kanakaster balutensis Mah, 2017
- Kanakaster convexus Mah, 2017
- Kanakaster discus Mah, 2017
- Kanakaster larae Mah, 2017
- Kanakaster longibrachium Mah, 2026
- Kanakaster plinthinos Mah, 2017
- Kanakaster solidus Mah, 2017
