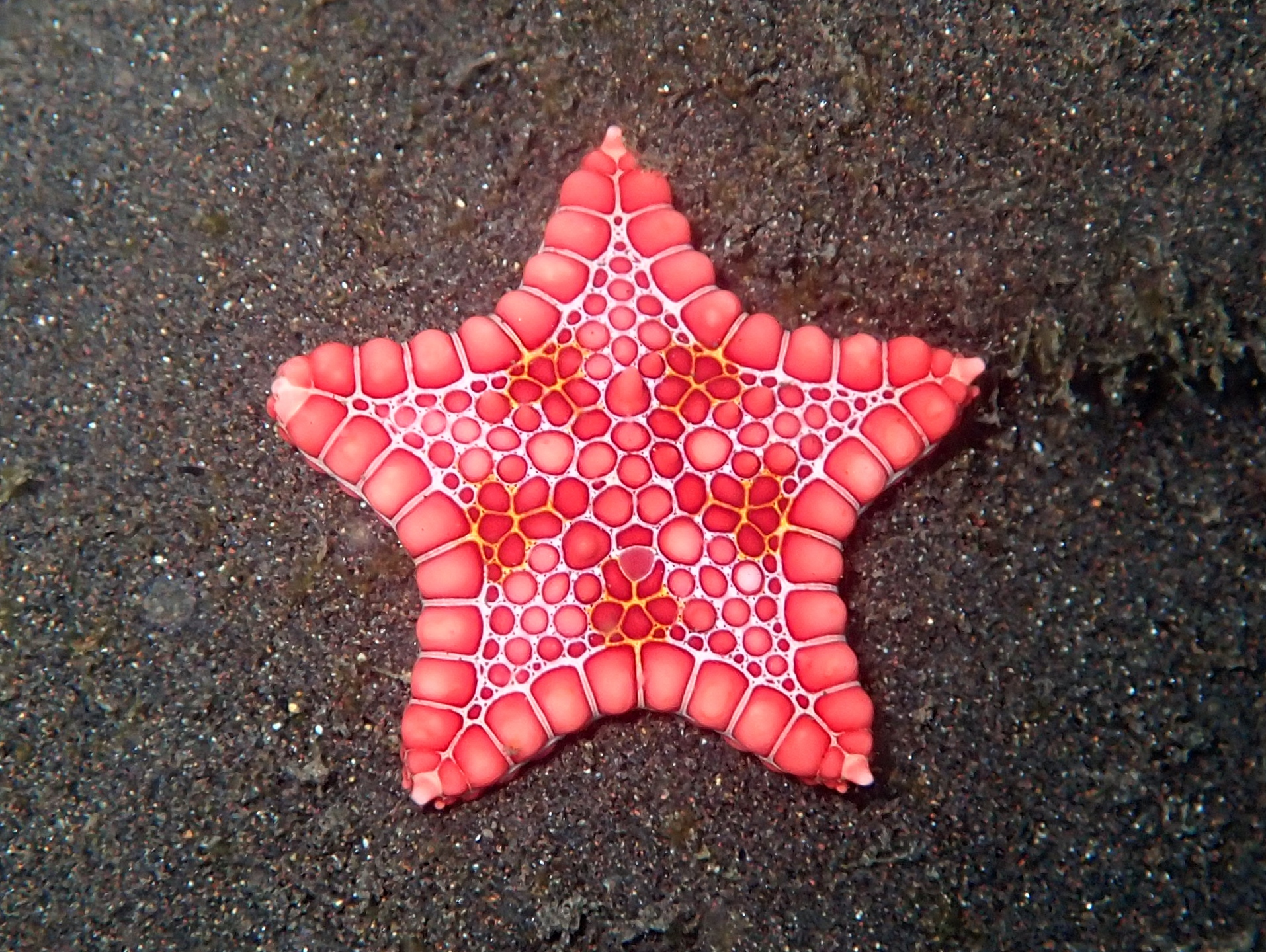
- Goniaster tessellatus

Scientific classification
- Kingdom: Animalia
- Phylum: Echinodermata
- Class: Asteroidea
- Order: Valvatida
- Family: Goniasteridae
- Genus: Goniaster; Agassiz, 1836

= Goniaster =

Genus of starfishes

Goniaster is a genus of echinoderms belonging to the family Goniasteridae.

The species of this genus are found in Atlantic Ocean.

Species:

- Goniaster marginatus Forbes, 1848
- Goniaster mulleri Heller, 1858
- Goniaster scrobiculatus Heller, 1858
- Goniaster stokesi Forbes, 1848
- Goniaster tessellatus (Lamarck, 1816)
