= Kanakaster longibrachium =

Scientific classification
- Kingdom: Animalia
- Phylum: Echinodermata
- Class: Asteroidea
- Order: Valvatida
- Family: Goniasteridae
- Genus: Kanakaster
- Species: K. longibrachium

Binomial name
- Kanakaster longibrachium Mah, 2026

Species of sea star

Kanakaster longibrachium is a species of sea star in the family Goniasteridae found off New Caledonia.

== Etymology ==
The species epithet longibrachium is derived from the Latin longus and brachium for "long arm".

== Taxonomy and systematics ==
This species is placed in the genus Kanakaster due to its granulated dermis covering the body surface and the single serial row of two furrow spines per plate with no subambulacral spination, which are characteristic of the subfamily Ferdininae. It is distinguished primarily by its elongate arms and the presence of numerous abutted superomarginal plates over the arm radius. It joins the other three species of Kanakaster known from New Caledonia. In terms of total marginal plates (17–18 per interradius), it compares with K. convexus, K. solidus, and the Philippine K. balutensis, but none of these species shows the large number of abutted superomarginal plates or the elongate arm shape.

== Description ==
The species has a stellate body with triangular, elongate arms and curved interradial arcs. A dermis is present over the abactinal surface, weakly obscuring plate boundaries. Superomarginal plates are abutted along the arm, with 6 to 7 pairs completely abutted and 1 or 2 partially so. The superomarginals and inferomarginals number 17 to 18 per interradius (arm tip to arm tip) and create a wide dorsal abactinal periphery, forming 28% of the disk radius. Superomarginal plate surfaces have a roughened texture but no apparent surficial accessories. The actinal intermediate region is composed of two series, with one extending to the arm base before tapering off. The actinal and adambulacral plates are covered by a dense granular layer. Furrow spines number two per plate; they are blunt-tipped, quadrate to rectangular in shape, larger proximally, and arranged serially. No subambulacral spines or other adambulacral accessories are present. The disk region has a sharply dark coloration relative to the central primary circlet and the light-to-white superomarginal plates.

== Distribution and habitat ==
This species is known from off New Caledonia at depths of 310 to 380 meters.
