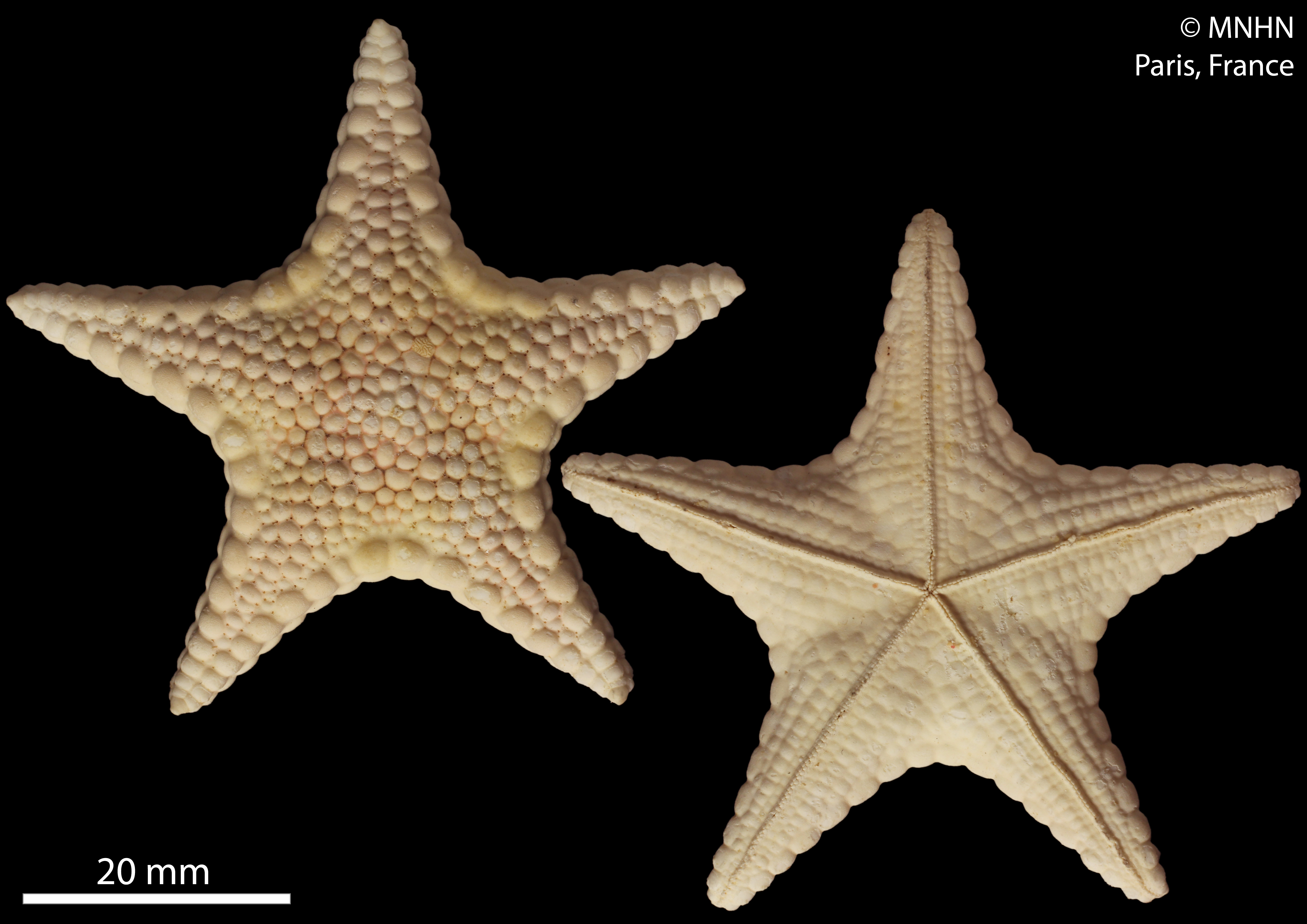

Scientific classification
- Kingdom: Animalia
- Phylum: Echinodermata
- Class: Asteroidea
- Order: Valvatida
- Family: Goniasteridae
- Subfamily: Ferdininae
- Genus: Eosaster; Mah, 2017
- Species: E. nadiae

Binomial name
- Eosaster nadiae Mah, 2017

= Eosaster =

Genus of starfishes

Eosaster is a monotypic genus of echinoderms belonging to the family Goniasteridae. The only species is Eosaster nadiae.

The species is found in Pacific Ocean (near Australia).
