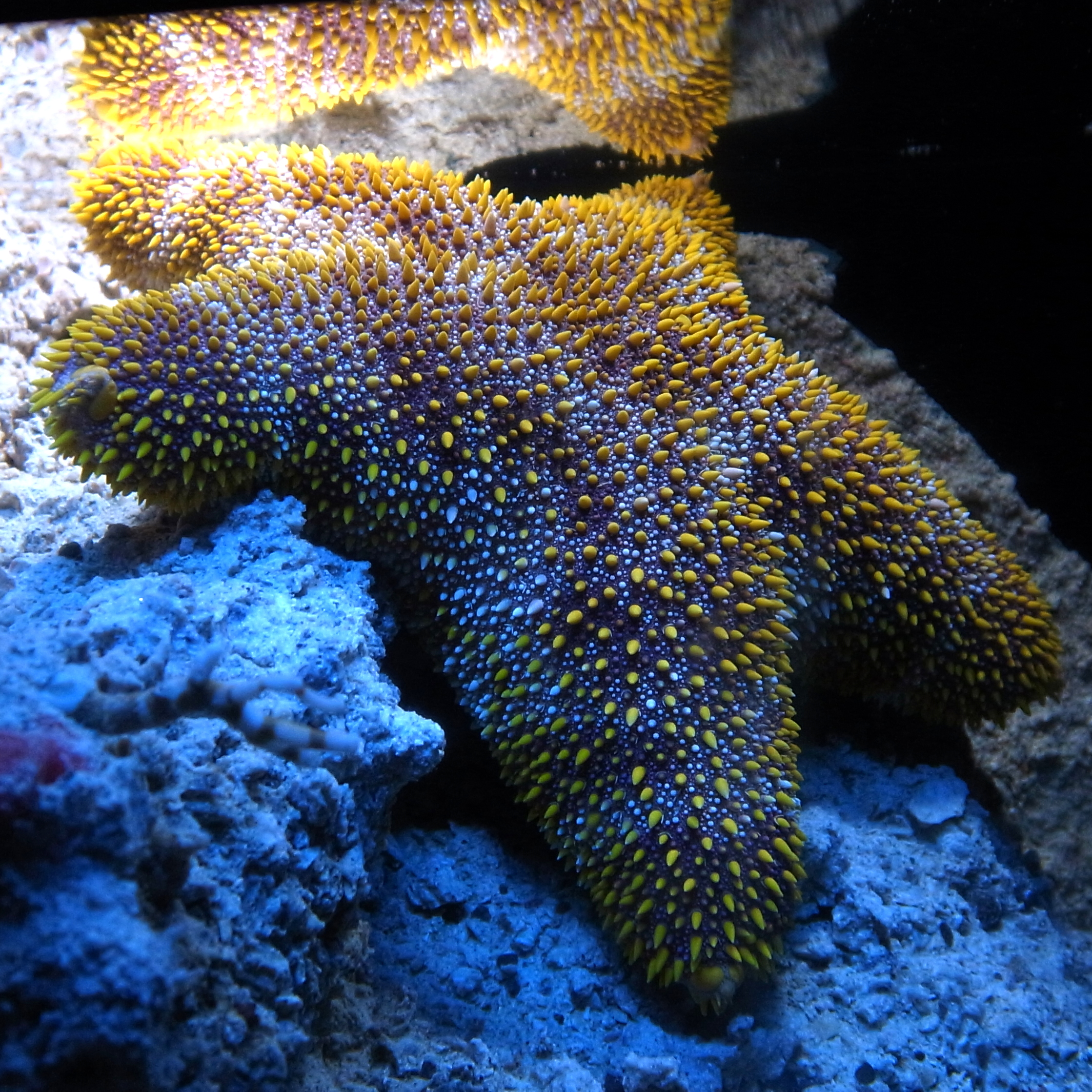
- Asterodiscides japonicus

Scientific classification
- Kingdom: Animalia
- Phylum: Echinodermata
- Class: Asteroidea
- Order: Valvatida
- Family: Asterodiscididae
- Genus: Asterodiscides; A. M. Clark, 1974

Species
- See text

Synonyms
- Asterodiscus Gray, 1847

= Asterodiscides =

Genus of starfishes

Asterodiscides is a genus of starfish. Members of the genus have five short tapering arms and a wide disc. The genus was first described by the British zoologist Ailsa McGown Clark in 1974.

== Genera ==
The following species are listed in the World Register of Marine Species:-

- Asterodiscides belli Rowe, 1977
- Asterodiscides bicornutus Lane & Rowe, 2009
- Asterodiscides cherbonnieri Rowe, 1985
- Asterodiscides conulus Mah, 2026
- Asterodiscides crosnieri Rowe, 1985
- Asterodiscides culcitulus Rowe, 1977
- Asterodiscides elegans (Gray, 1847)
- Asterodiscides fourmanoiri Rowe, 1985
- Asterodiscides grayi Rowe, 1977
- Asterodiscides helonotus (Fisher, 1913)
- Asterodiscides japonicus Imaoka, Irimura, Okutani, Oguro, Oji & Kanazawa, 1991
- Asterodiscides lacrimulus Rowe, 1977
- Asterodiscides macroplax Rowe, 1985
- Asterodiscides multispinus Rowe, 1985
- Asterodiscides pinguiculus Rowe, 1977
- Asterodiscides soleae Rowe, 1985
- Asterodiscides tessellatus Rowe, 1977
- Asterodiscides truncatus (Coleman, 1911)
- Asterodiscides tuberculosus (Fisher, 1906)
