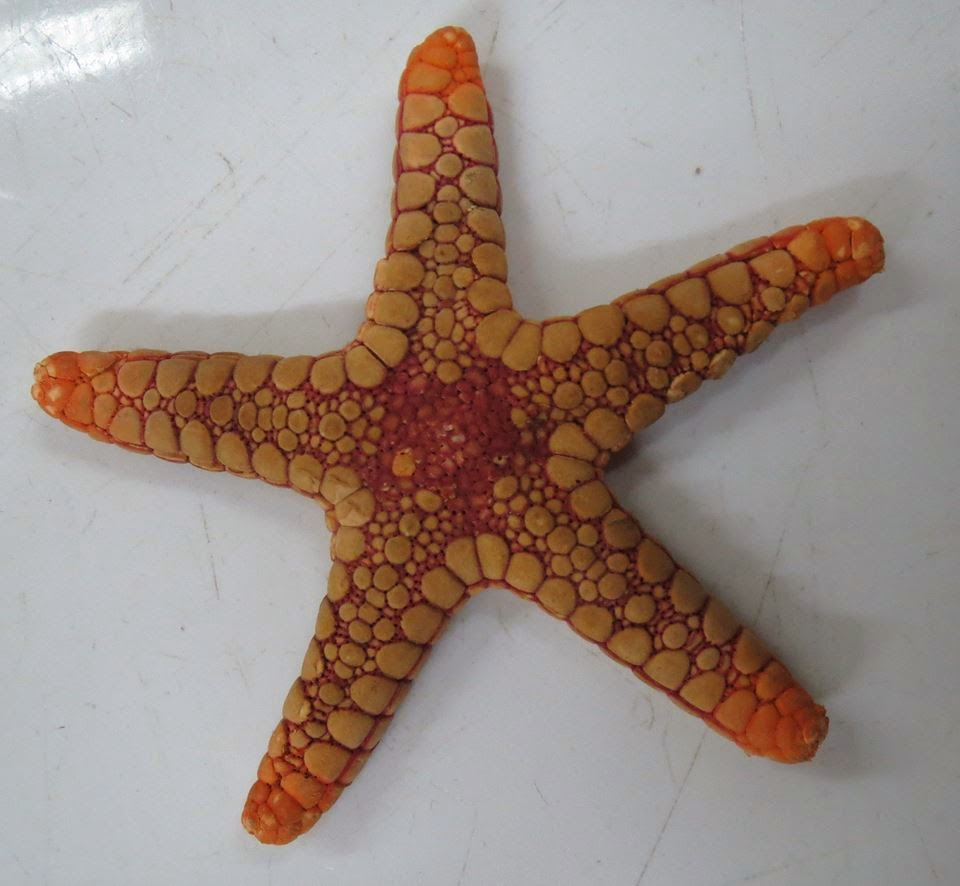
- Paraferdina plakos

Scientific classification
- Kingdom: Animalia
- Phylum: Echinodermata
- Class: Asteroidea
- Order: Valvatida
- Family: Goniasteridae
- Subfamily: Ferdininae
- Genus: Paraferdina; James, 1973

= Paraferdina =

Genus of starfishes

Paraferdina is a genus of echinoderms belonging to the family Goniasteridae.

The species of this genus are found in Indian Ocean.

Species:

- Paraferdina laccadivensis James, 1973
- Paraferdina plakos Mah, 2017
- Paraferdina sohariae Marsh & Price, 1991
