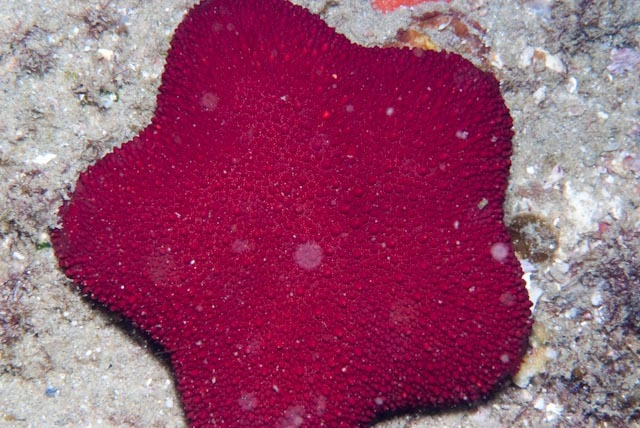

Scientific classification
- Kingdom: Animalia
- Phylum: Echinodermata
- Class: Asteroidea
- Order: Valvatida
- Family: Asterodiscididae
- Genus: Asterodiscides
- Species: A. belli

Binomial name
- Asterodiscides belli Rowe, 1977

Synonyms
- Asterodiscides elegans belli Rowe, 1977

= Asterodiscides belli =

Species of starfish

Asterodiscides belli is a species of starfish within the family Asterodiscididae. The species lives in waters off Seychelles and Somalia at depths of 22 to 40 meters.
