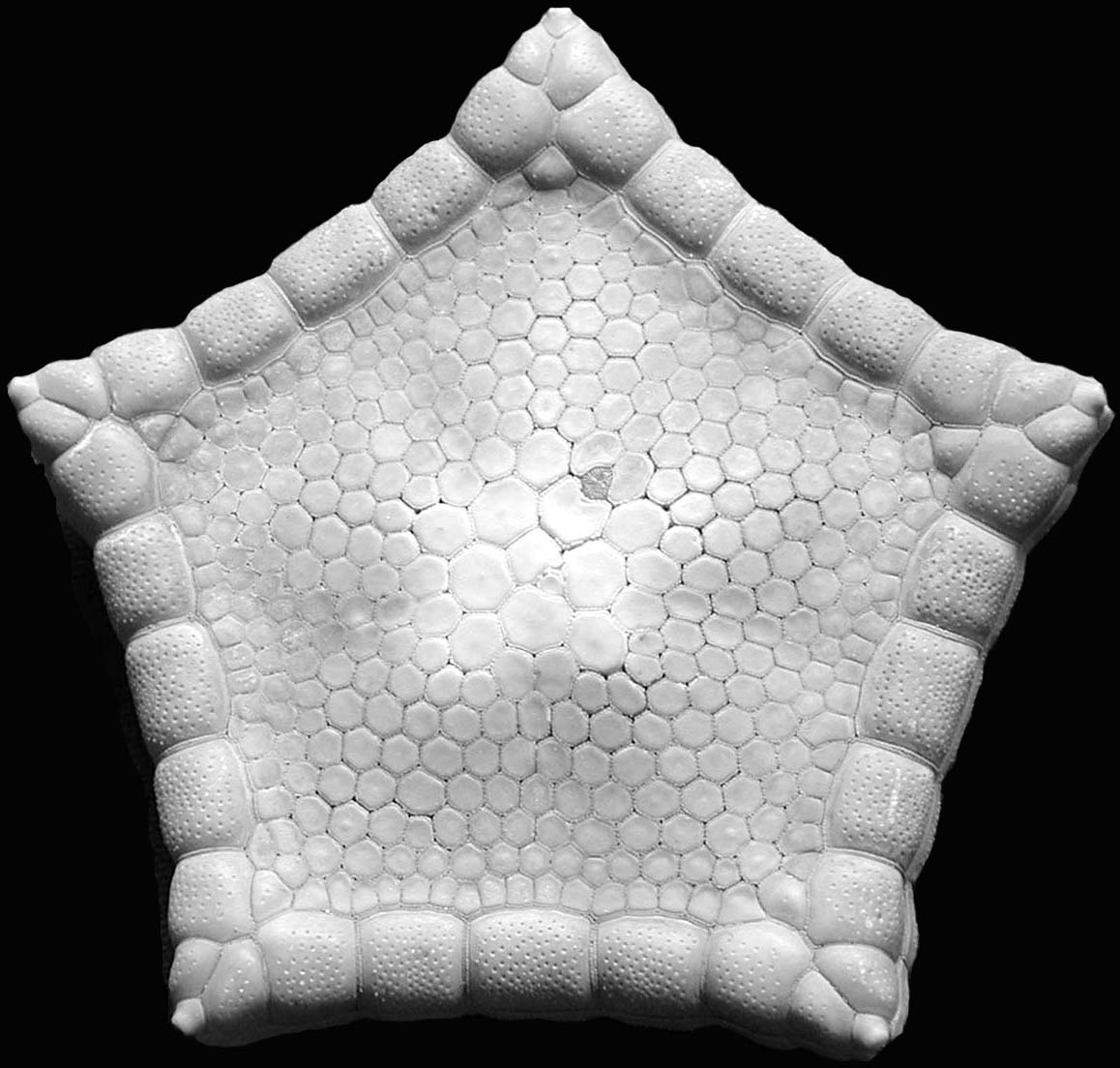
- Eknomiaster beccae

Scientific classification
- Kingdom: Animalia
- Phylum: Echinodermata
- Class: Asteroidea
- Order: Valvatida
- Family: Goniasteridae
- Subfamily: Pentagonasterinae
- Genus: Eknomiaster; Clark, 2001

= Eknomiaster =

Genus of starfishes

Eknomiaster is a genus of echinoderms belonging to the family Goniasteridae.

The species of this genus are found in Australia and Madagascar.

Species:

- Eknomiaster beccae Mah, 2007
- Eknomiaster horologium Mah, 2018
- Eknomiaster macauleyensis H.E.S Clark, 2001
