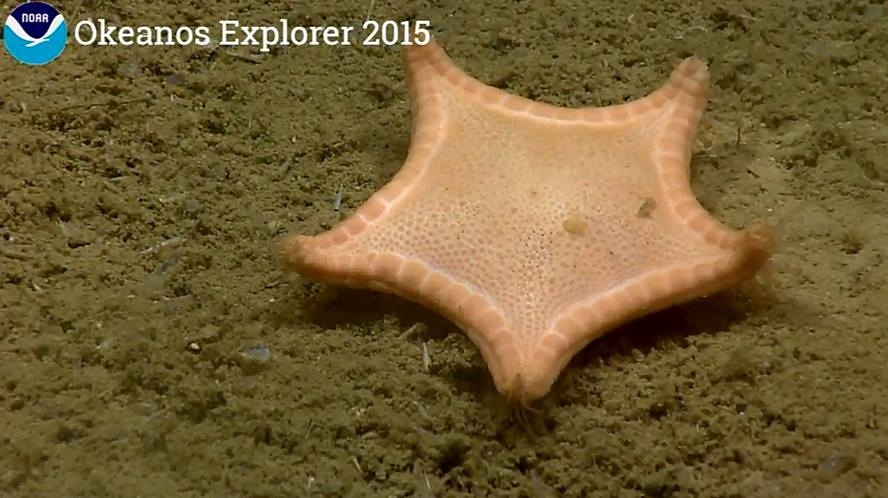
- Plinthaster dentatus

Scientific classification
- Kingdom: Animalia
- Phylum: Echinodermata
- Class: Asteroidea
- Order: Valvatida
- Family: Goniasteridae
- Genus: Plinthaster; Verrill, 1899

= Plinthaster =

Genus of starfishes

Plinthaster is a genus of echinoderms belonging to the family Goniasteridae.

The genus has almost cosmopolitan distribution.

Species:

- Plinthaster ceramoidea (Fisher, 1906)
- Plinthaster dentatus (Perrier, 1884)
- Plinthaster doederleini (Koehler, 1909)
- Plinthaster lenaigae Mah, 2018
- Plinthaster untiedtae Mah, 2018
