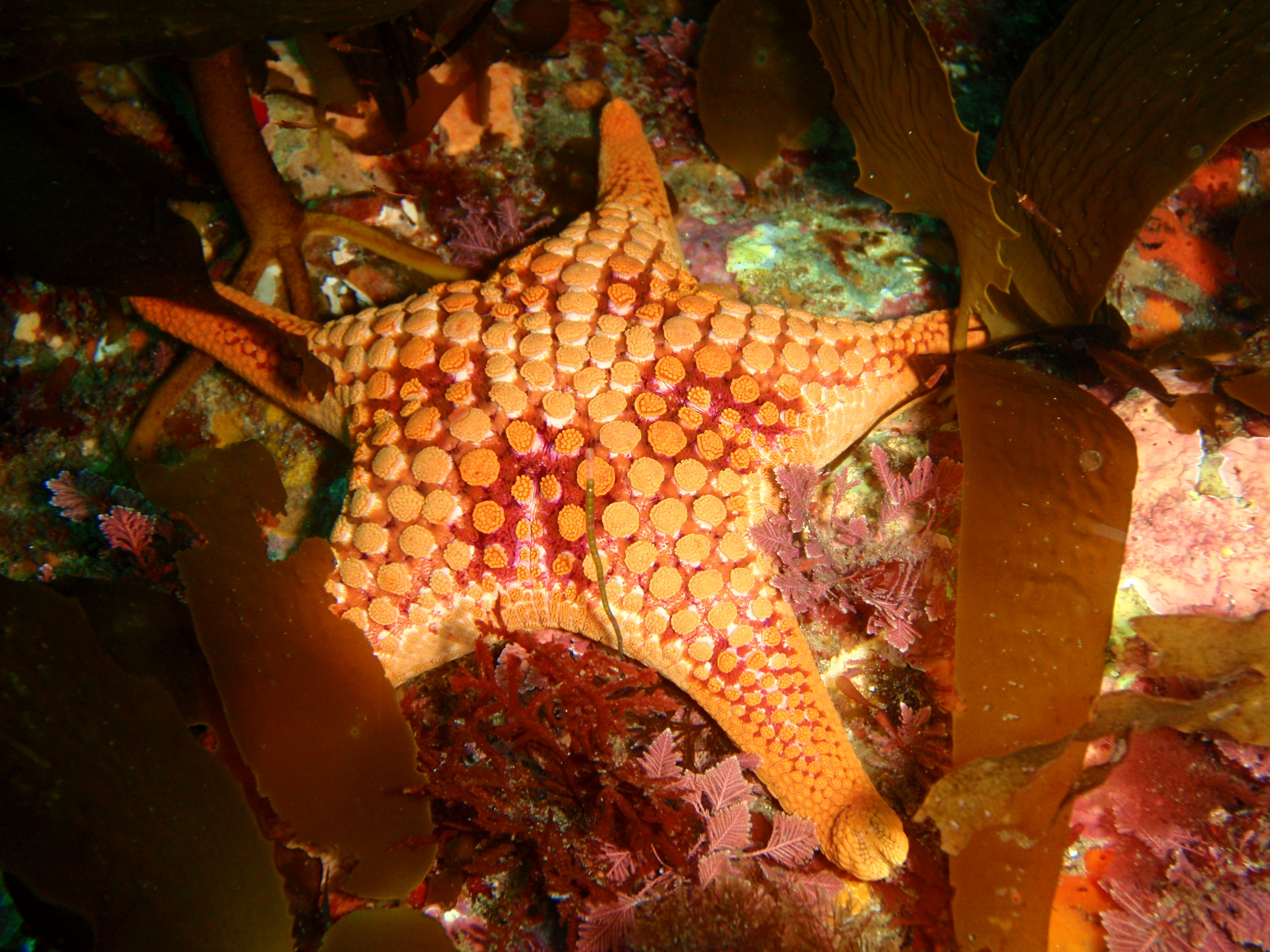
- Nectria ocellata

Scientific classification
- Kingdom: Animalia
- Phylum: Echinodermata
- Class: Asteroidea
- Order: Valvatida
- Family: Goniasteridae
- Genus: Nectria; Gray, 1840

= Nectria (echinoderm) =

Genus of starfishes

Nectria is a genus of echinoderms belonging to the family Goniasteridae.

The species of this genus are found in Australia.

== Species ==
Species:

Image	Scientific name	Distribution
	Nectria humilis Zeidler & Rowe, 1986	Southern Australia
	Nectria macrobrachia H.L. Clark, 1923	Southern Australia
	Nectria multispina H.L. Clark, 1928	Southern Australia
	Nectria ocellata Perrier, 1875	Southeastern Australia
	Nectria ocellifera (Lamarck, 1816)	Western Australia
	Nectria pedicelligera Mortensen, 1925	Southeastern Australia
	Nectria saoria Shepherd, 1967	Southern Australia
	Nectria wilsoni Shepherd & Hodgkin, 1966	Southern Australia
