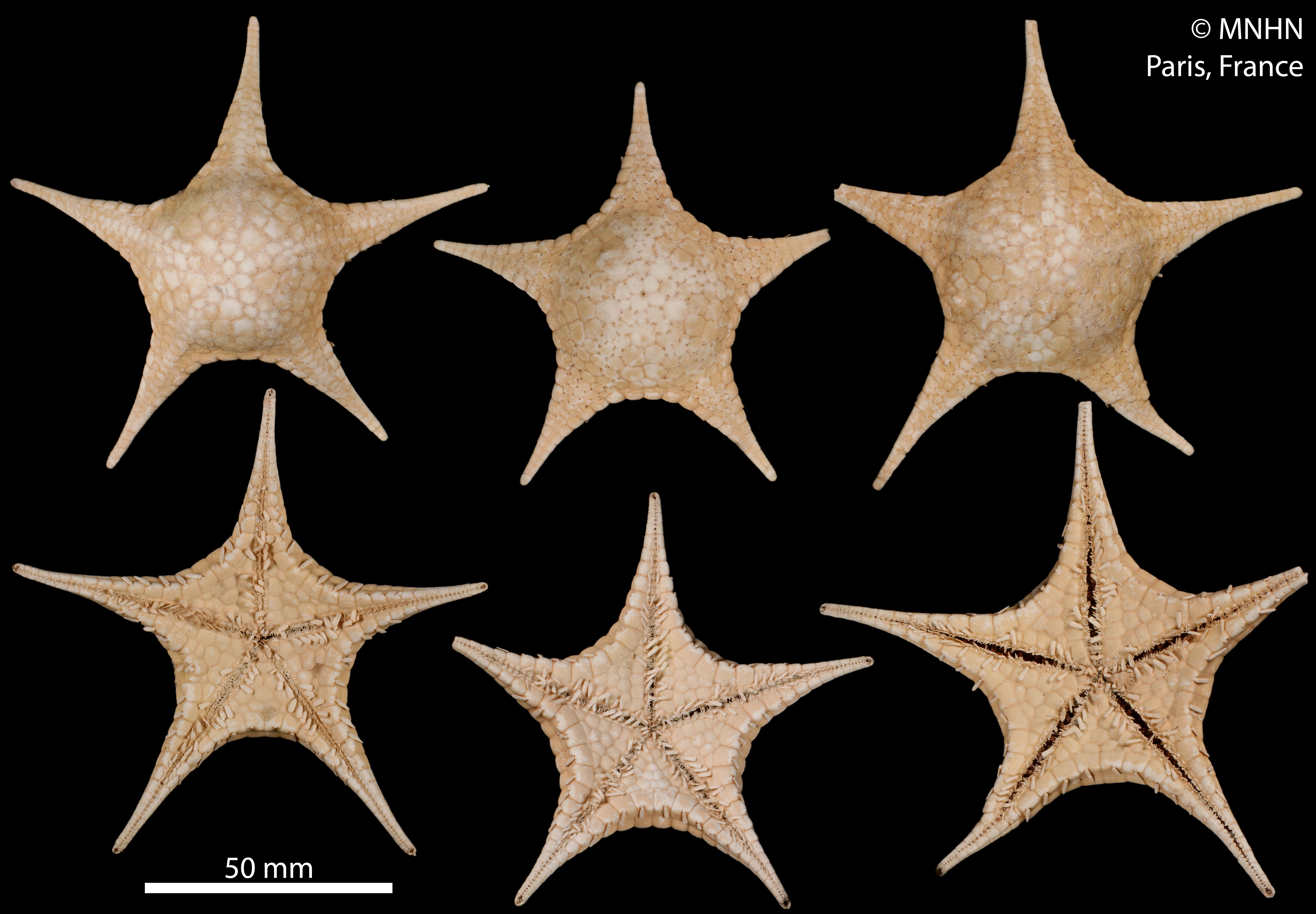
- Stellaster convexus

Scientific classification
- Kingdom: Animalia
- Phylum: Echinodermata
- Class: Asteroidea
- Order: Valvatida
- Family: Goniasteridae
- Genus: Stellaster; Gray, 1840

= Stellaster =

Genus of starfishes

Stellaster is a genus of echinoderms belonging to the family Goniasteridae.

The species of this genus are found in Old World.

Species:

- Stellaster albensis Geinitz, 1872
- Stellaster childreni Gray, 1840
- Stellaster convexus Jangoux, 1981
- Stellaster inspinosus H.L. Clark, 1916
- Stellaster princeps Sladen, 1889
- Stellaster squamulosus (Studer, 1884)
- Stellaster tuberculosus (von Martens, 1865)
