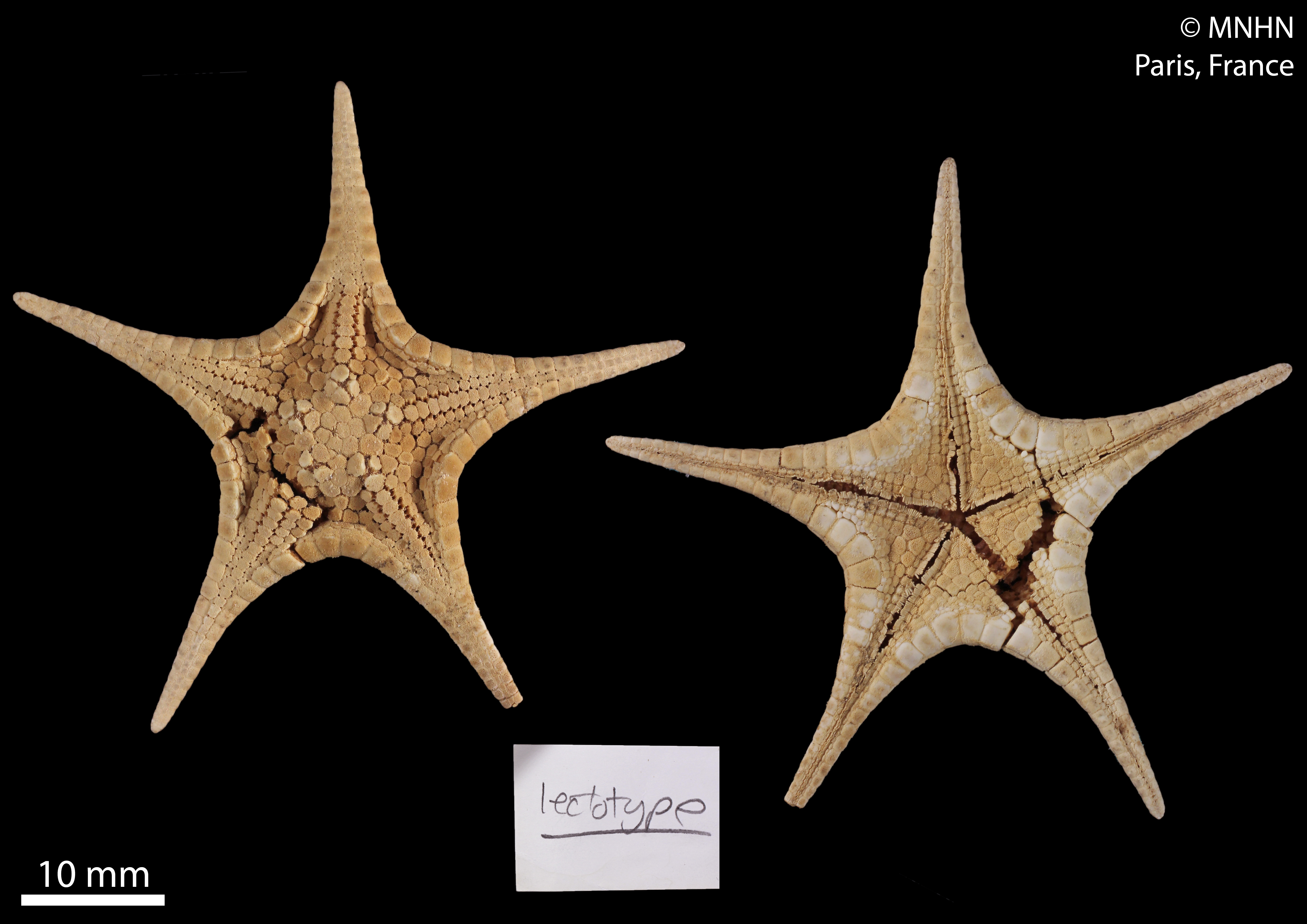
- Stellasteropsis fouadi

Scientific classification
- Kingdom: Animalia
- Phylum: Echinodermata
- Class: Asteroidea
- Order: Valvatida
- Family: Goniasteridae
- Genus: Stellasteropsis; Dollfus, 1936

= Stellasteropsis =

Genus of starfishes

Stellasteropsis is a genus of echinoderms belonging to the family Goniasteridae.

The species of this genus are found in Indian Ocean and Malesia.

Species:

- Stellasteropsis colubrinus Macan, 1938
- Stellasteropsis fouadi Dollfus, 1936
- Stellasteropsis pharaonum Dollfus, 1936
- Stellasteropsis tuberculiferus Macan, 1938
