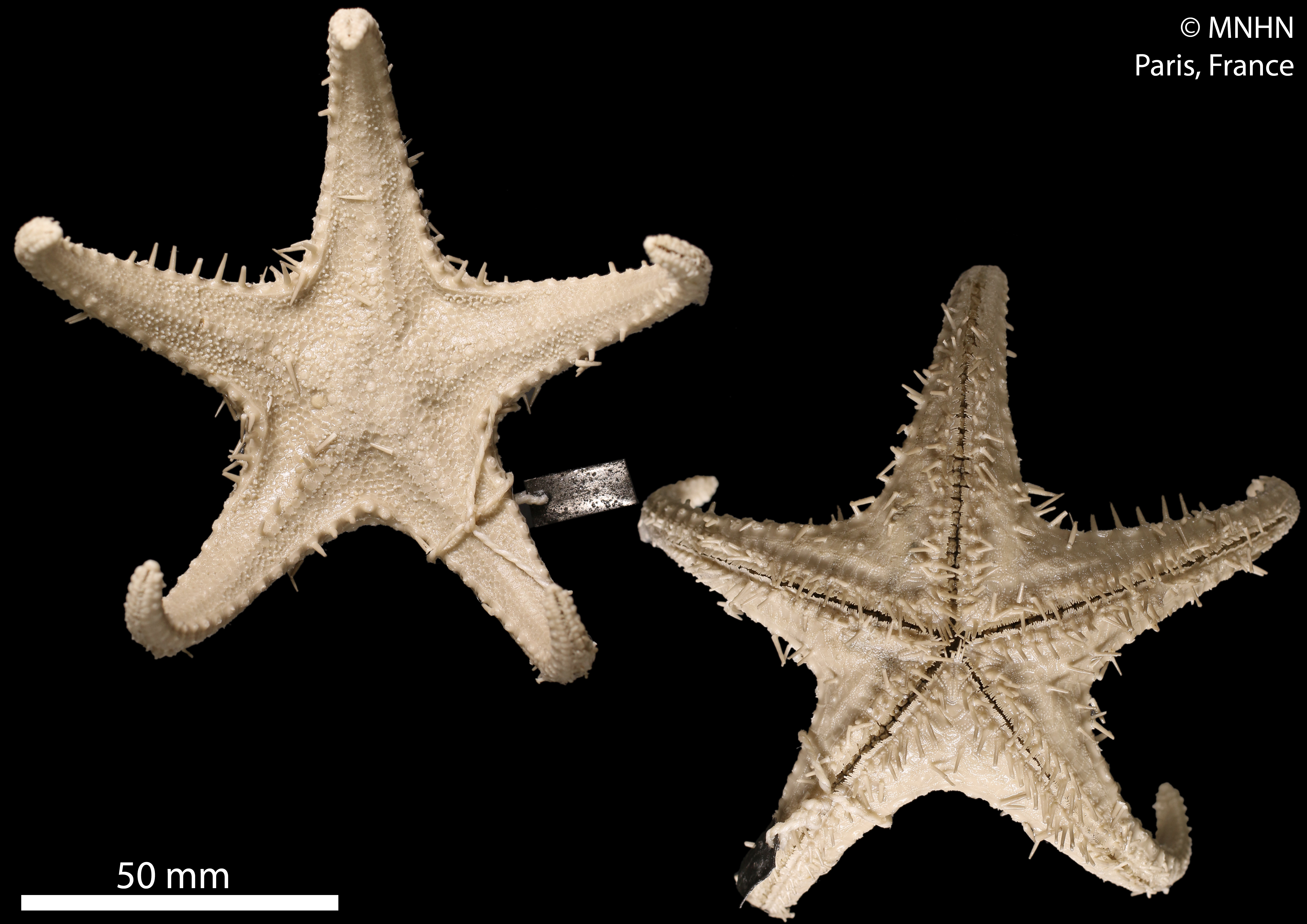
- Milteliphaster woodmasoni

Scientific classification
- Kingdom: Animalia
- Phylum: Echinodermata
- Class: Asteroidea
- Order: Valvatida
- Family: Goniasteridae
- Genus: Milteliphaster; Alcock, 1893

= Milteliphaster =

Genus of starfishes

Milteliphaster is a genus of echinoderms belonging to the family Goniasteridae.

Species:

- Milteliphaster regenerator (Döderlein, 1922)
- Milteliphaster spinosus (H.L. Clark, 1916)
- Milteliphaster wanganellensis H.E.S. Clark, 1982
- Milteliphaster woodmasoni Alcock, 1893
