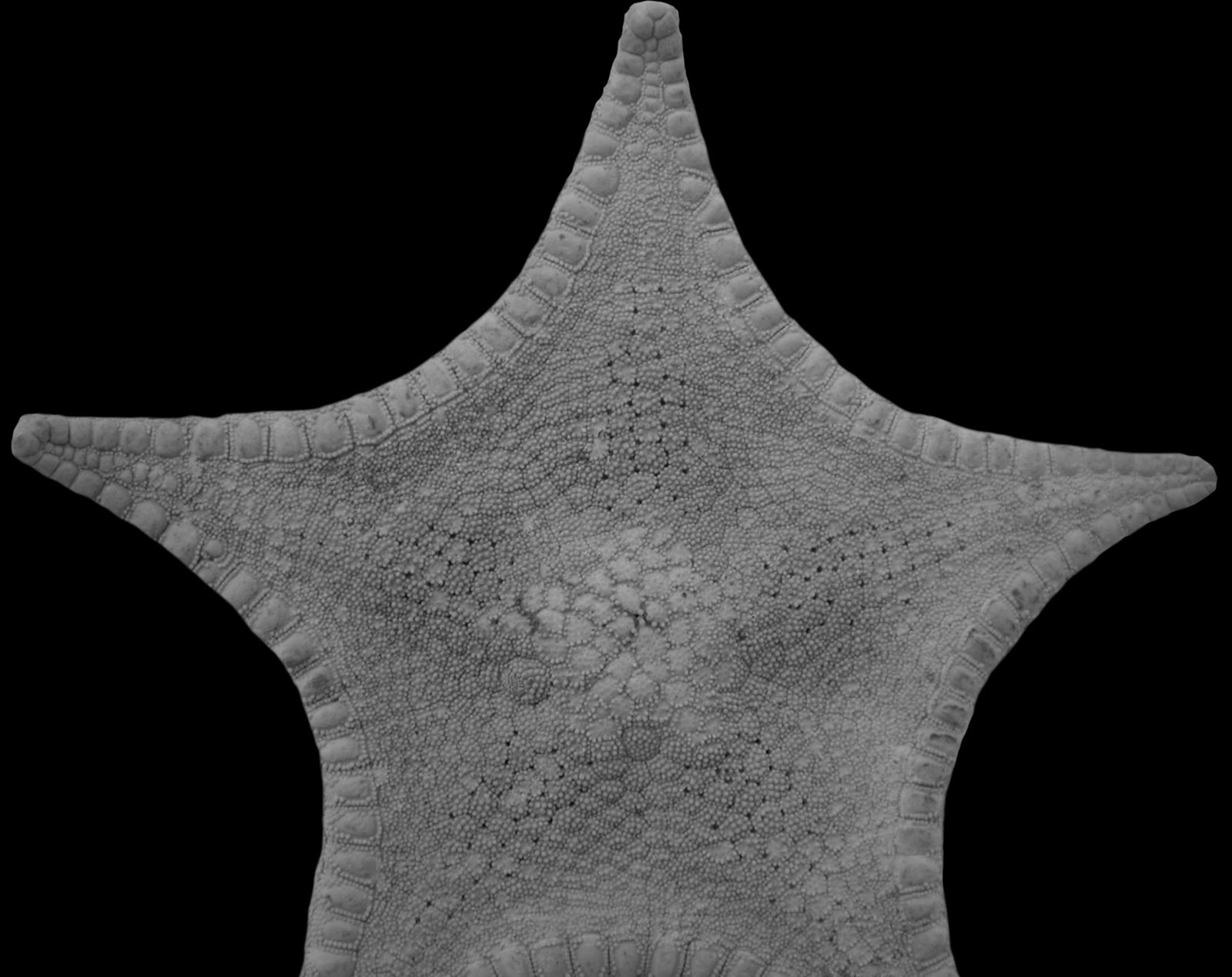
- Pillsburiaster calvus

Scientific classification
- Kingdom: Animalia
- Phylum: Echinodermata
- Class: Asteroidea
- Order: Valvatida
- Family: Goniasteridae
- Genus: Pillsburiaster; Halpern, 1970

= Pillsburiaster =

Genus of starfishes

Pillsburiaster is a genus of echinoderms belonging to the family Goniasteridae.

The genus has almost cosmopolitan distribution.

Species:

- Pillsburiaster annandalei (Koehler, 1909)
- Pillsburiaster aoteanus McKnight, 1973
- Pillsburiaster calvus Mah, 2011
- Pillsburiaster cuenoti (Koehler, 1909)
- Pillsburiaster döderleini (Koehler, 1910)
- Pillsburiaster ernesti (Ludwig, 1905)
- Pillsburiaster geographicus Halpern, 1970
- Pillsburiaster indutilis McKnight, 2006
- Pillsburiaster indutilus McKnight, 2006
- Pillsburiaster investigatoris (Alcock, 1893)
- Pillsburiaster maini McKnight, 1973
