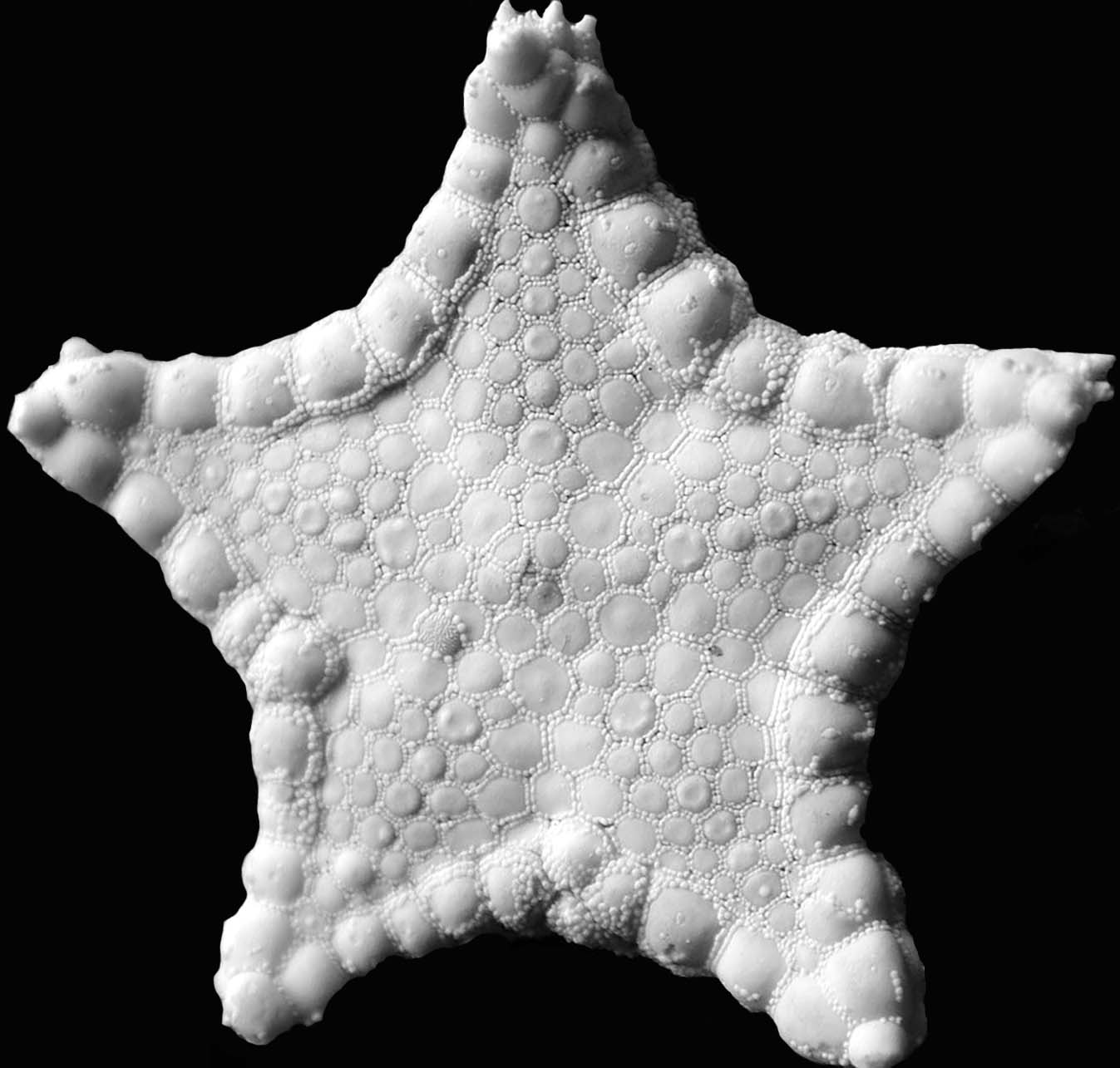

Scientific classification
- Kingdom: Animalia
- Phylum: Echinodermata
- Class: Asteroidea
- Order: Valvatida
- Family: Goniasteridae
- Subfamily: Pentagonasterinae
- Genus: Ryukuaster; Mah, 2007
- Species: R. onnae

Binomial name
- Ryukuaster onnae Mah, 2007

= Ryukuaster =

Genus of starfishes

Ryukuaster is a monotypic genus of echinoderms belonging to the family Goniasteridae. The only species is Ryukuaster onnae.

The species is found in Japan.
