= Asterodiscides conulus =

Scientific classification
- Kingdom: Animalia
- Phylum: Echinodermata
- Class: Asteroidea
- Order: Valvatida
- Family: Asterodiscididae
- Genus: Asterodiscides
- Species: A. conulus

Binomial name
- Asterodiscides conulus Mah, 2026

Synonyms
- Asterodiscides conulus Mah, 2026

Species of starfish

Asterodiscides conulus is a species of starfish in the family of Asterodiscididae. It was first described in 2026 from specimens collected at Ashmore Reef Marine Park, Western Australia. The species epithet conulus is derived from the Latin for cone.

== Taxonomy ==
Asterodiscides conulus belongs to the genus Asterodiscides within the family Asterodiscididae, a group of cushion-shaped sea stars distributed throughout the Indo-Pacific region.
