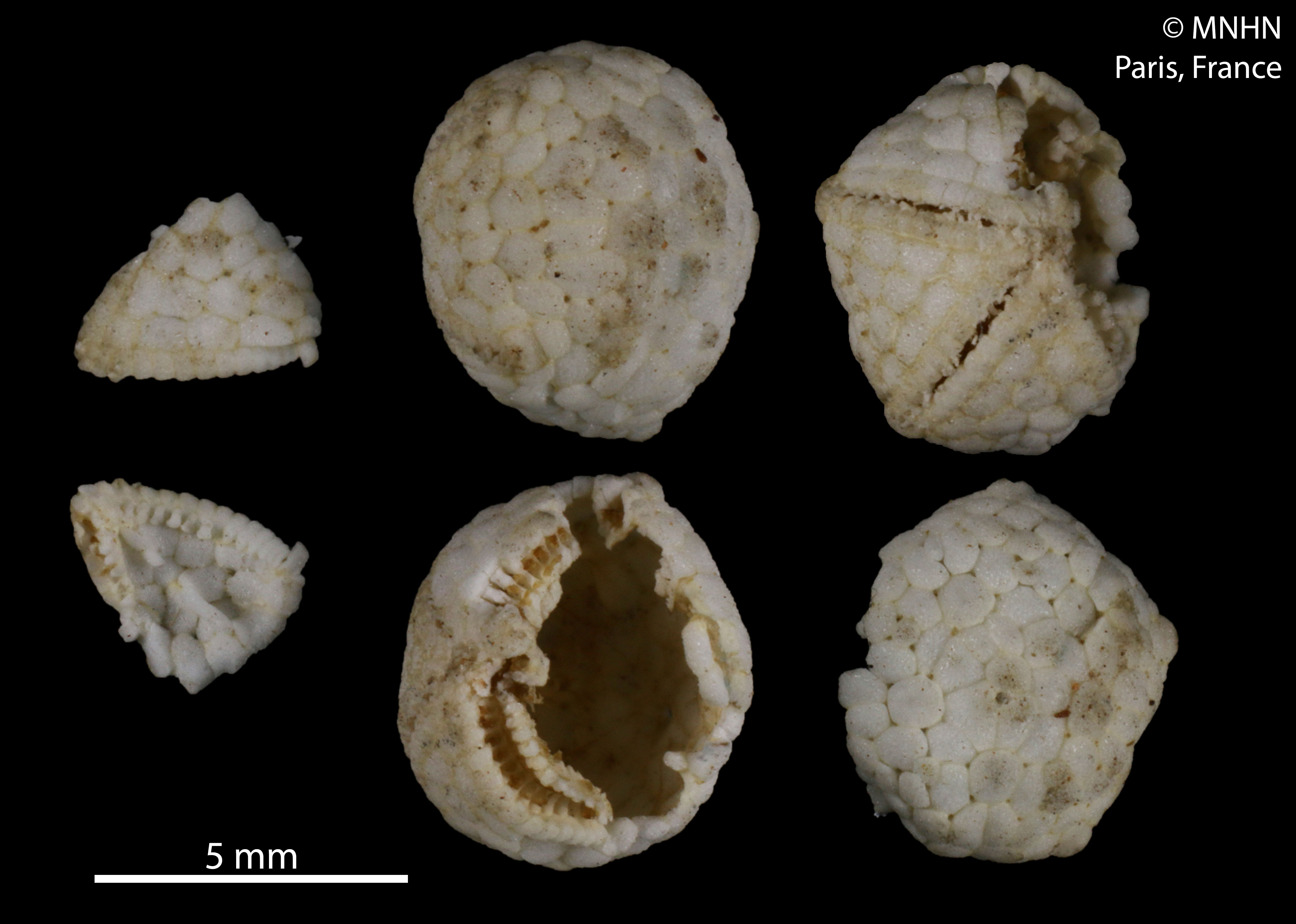
- Podosphaeraster thalassae

Scientific classification
- Kingdom: Animalia
- Phylum: Echinodermata
- Class: Asteroidea
- Order: Valvatida
- Family: Podosphaerasteridae; Fujita & Rowe, 2002
- Genus: Podosphaeraster; Clark, 1962

= Podosphaeraster =

Genus of starfishes

Podosphaeraster is a genus of echinoderms belonging to the monotypic family Podosphaerasteridae.

The species of this genus are found in Europe, Malesia, Australia.

Species:

- Podosphaeraster gustavei Rowe, 1985
- Podosphaeraster polyplax A.M.Clark, 1962
- Podosphaeraster pulvinatus Rowe & Nichols, 1980
- Podosphaeraster somnambulator McKnight, 2006
- Podosphaeraster thalassae Cherbonnier, 1970
- Podosphaeraster toyoshiomaruae Fujita & Rowe, 2002
