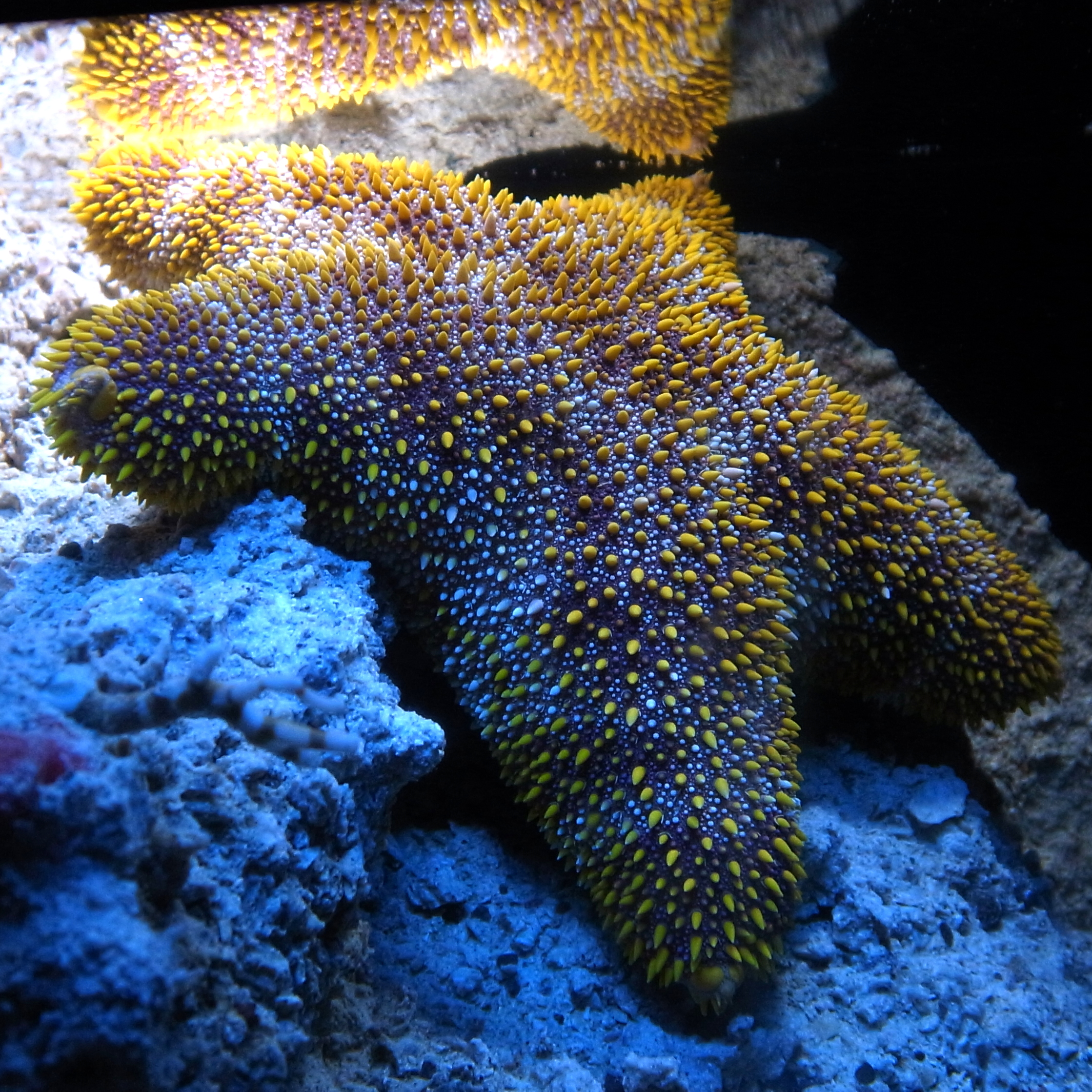
- Asterodiscides japonicus

Scientific classification
- Kingdom: Animalia
- Phylum: Echinodermata
- Class: Asteroidea
- Order: Valvatida
- Family: Asterodiscididae; Rowe, 1977

Genera
- See text

= Asterodiscididae =

Family of starfishes

Asterodiscididae is a family of starfish. Members of the family have five short tapering arms and a wide disc. The family was first described by the Australian zoologist F.W.E. Rowe in 1977.

== Genera ==
The following genera are listed in the World Register of Marine Species:

- genus Amphiaster Verrill, 1868
  - Amphiaster insignis Verrill, 1868 -- East pacific
- genus Asterodiscides A. M. Clark, 1974
  - Asterodiscides belli Rowe, 1977 -- Somalia
  - Asterodiscides bicornutus Lane & Rowe, 2009 -- Philippines
  - Asterodiscides cherbonnieri Rowe, 1985 -- Madagascar (south)
  - Asterodiscides conulus Mah, 2026 -- Ashmore Reef, Western Australia
  - Asterodiscides crosnieri Rowe, 1985 -- Madagascar (north)
  - Asterodiscides culcitulus Rowe, 1977 -- Western Australia
  - Asterodiscides elegans (Gray, 1847) -- Indo-Pacific
  - Asterodiscides fourmanoiri Rowe, 1985 -- Madagascar (south)
  - Asterodiscides grayi Rowe, 1977 -- Western Australia
  - Asterodiscides helonotus (Fisher, 1913) -- Philippines
  - Asterodiscides japonicus Imaoka, Irimura, Okutani, Oguro, Oji & Kanazawa, 1991 -- Japan
  - Asterodiscides lacrimulus Rowe, 1977 -- Somalia
  - Asterodiscides macroplax Rowe, 1985 -- Western Australia
  - Asterodiscides multispinus Rowe, 1985 -- North-East Australia
  - Asterodiscides pinguiculus Rowe, 1977 -- Western Australia
  - Asterodiscides soleae Rowe, 1985 -- Western Australia
  - Asterodiscides tessellatus Rowe, 1977 -- Western Australia
  - Asterodiscides truncatus (Coleman, 1911) -- South-East Australia and New Zealand
  - Asterodiscides tuberculosus (Fisher, 1906) -- Hawaii
- fossil genus Kionaster Blake & Portell, 2011
  - fossil Kionaster petersonae Blake & Portell, 2011
- genus Paulia Gray, 1840
  - Paulia horrida Gray, 1840 -- Galapagos
- genus Pauliastra Mah, 2021
  - Pauliastra aenigma (Ludwig, 1905) -- Costa Rica
- genus Uokeaster Mah, 2021
  - Uokeaster ahi Mah, 2021 -- Rapa Nui

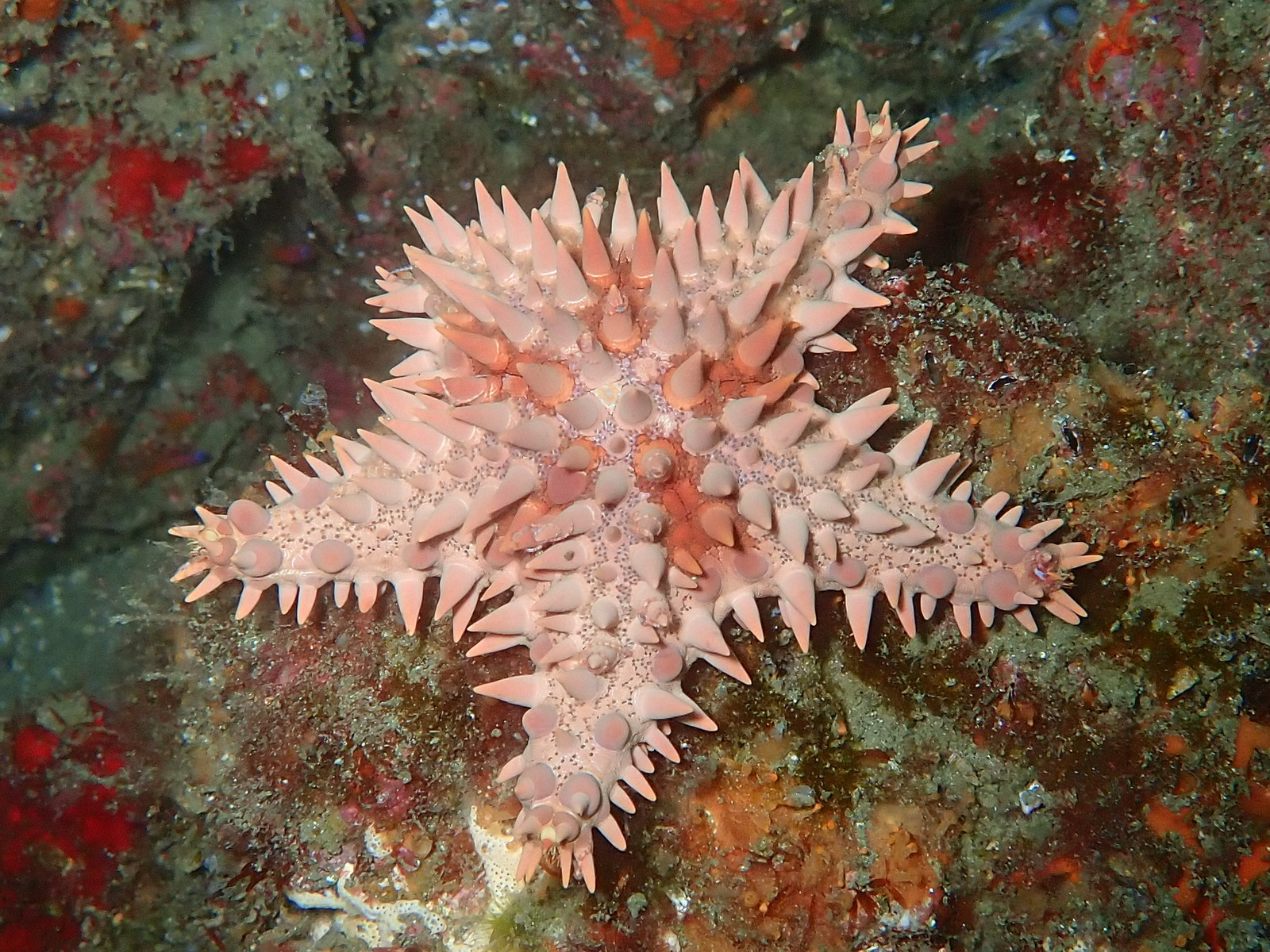
Amphiaster insignis.

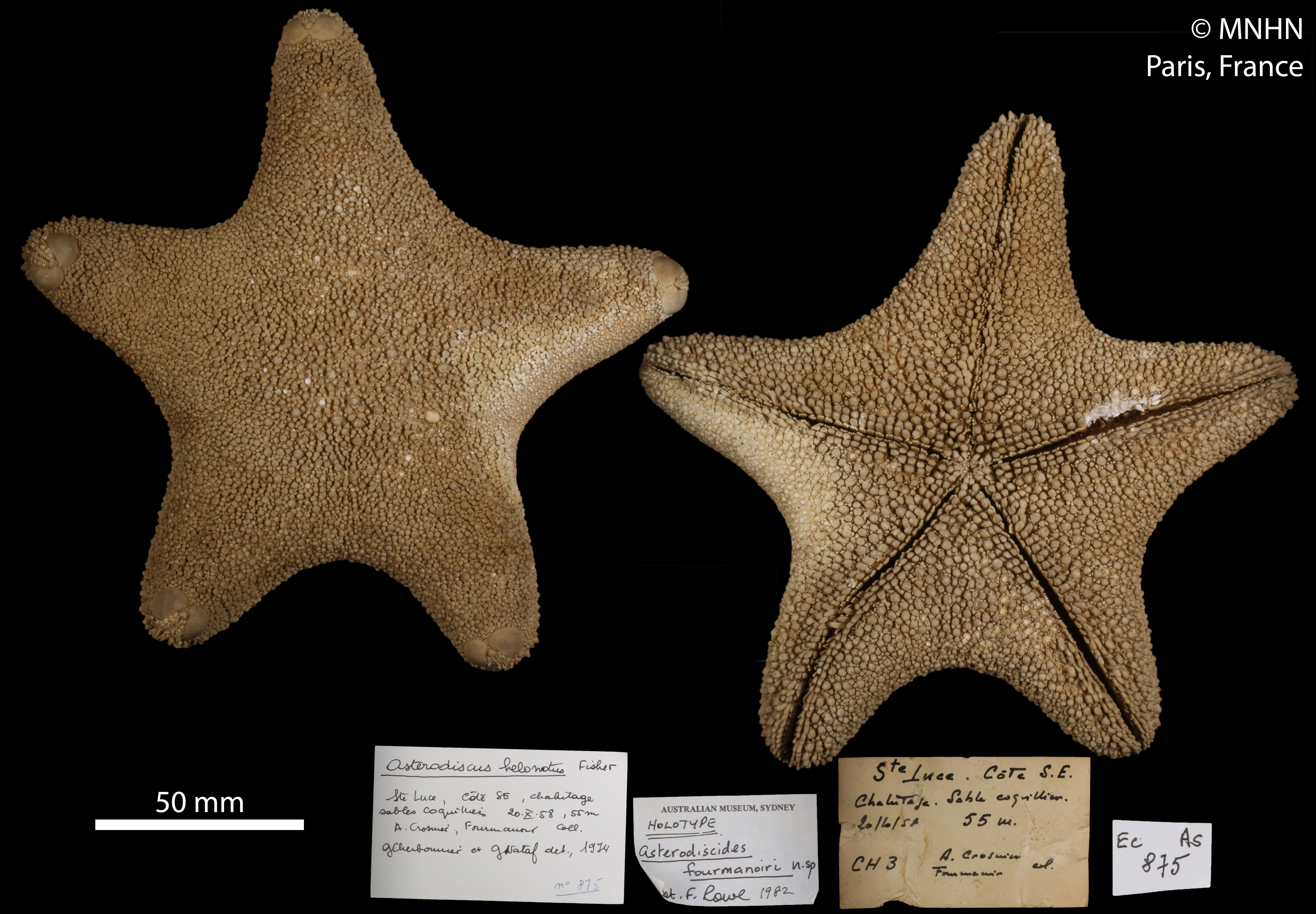
Asterodiscides fourmanoiri.

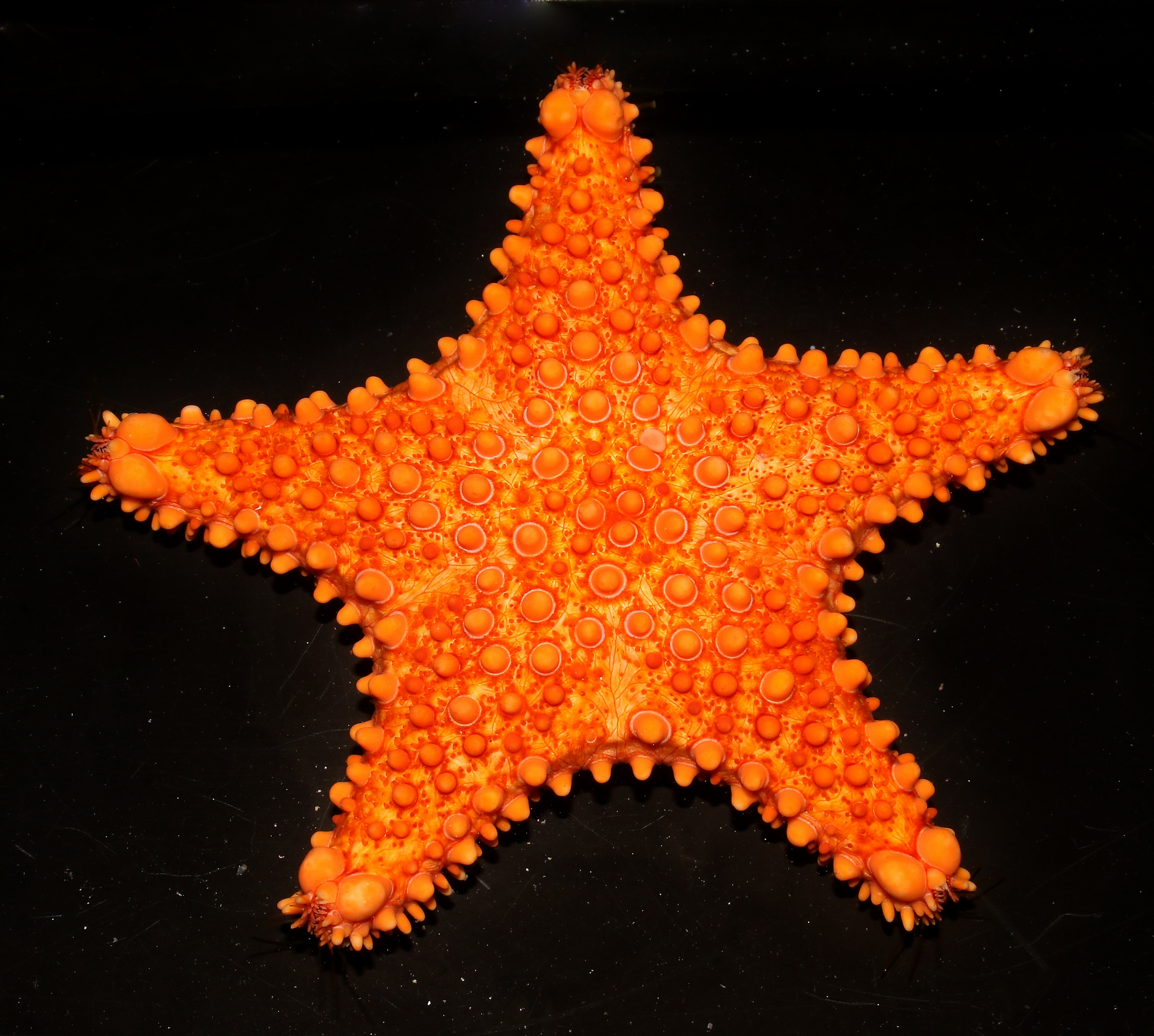
Uokeaster ahi.
