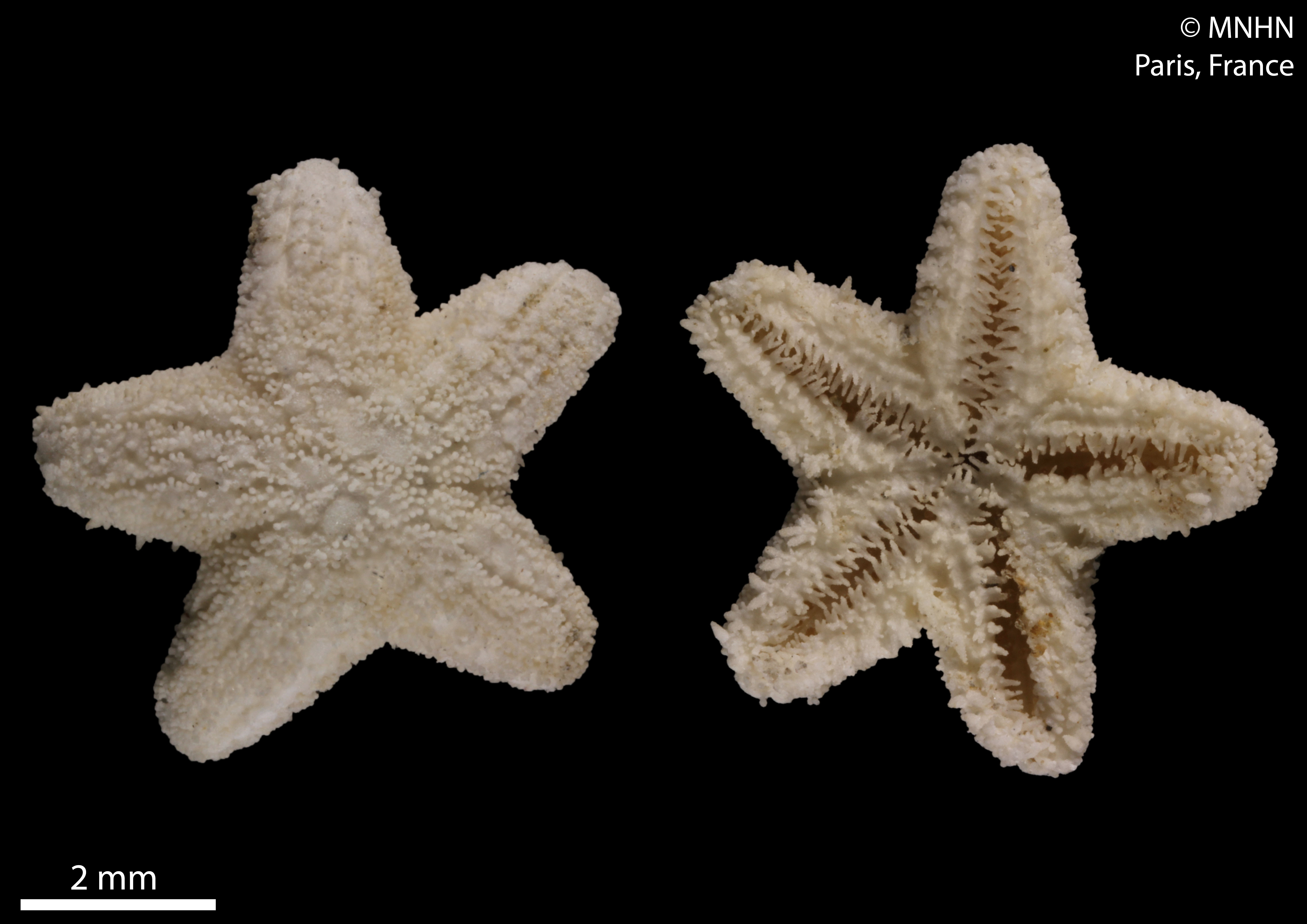
- Leilaster radians

Scientific classification
- Domain: Eukaryota
- Kingdom: Animalia
- Phylum: Echinodermata
- Class: Asteroidea
- Order: Valvatida
- Family: Leilasteridae

= Leilasteridae =

Family of starfishes

Leilasteridae is a family of echinoderms belonging to the order Valvatida.

Genera:

- Leilaster Clark, 1938
- Mirastrella Fisher, 1940
