= Ganeriidae =

Scientific classification
- Domain: Eukaryota
- Kingdom: Animalia
- Phylum: Echinodermata
- Class: Asteroidea
- Order: Valvatida
- Family: Ganeriidae

Family of echinoderms

Ganeriidae is a family of echinoderms belonging to the order Valvatida.

== Genera ==
Genera:

- Aleutiaster Clark, 1939
- Cuenotaster Thiéry, 1920
- Cycethra Bell, 1881
- Ganeria Gray, 1847
- Hyalinothrix Fisher, 1911
- Knightaster Clark, 1972
- Perknaster Sladen, 1889
- Scotiaster Koehler, 1907
- Tarachaster Fisher, 1913
- Vemaster Bernasconi, 1965
