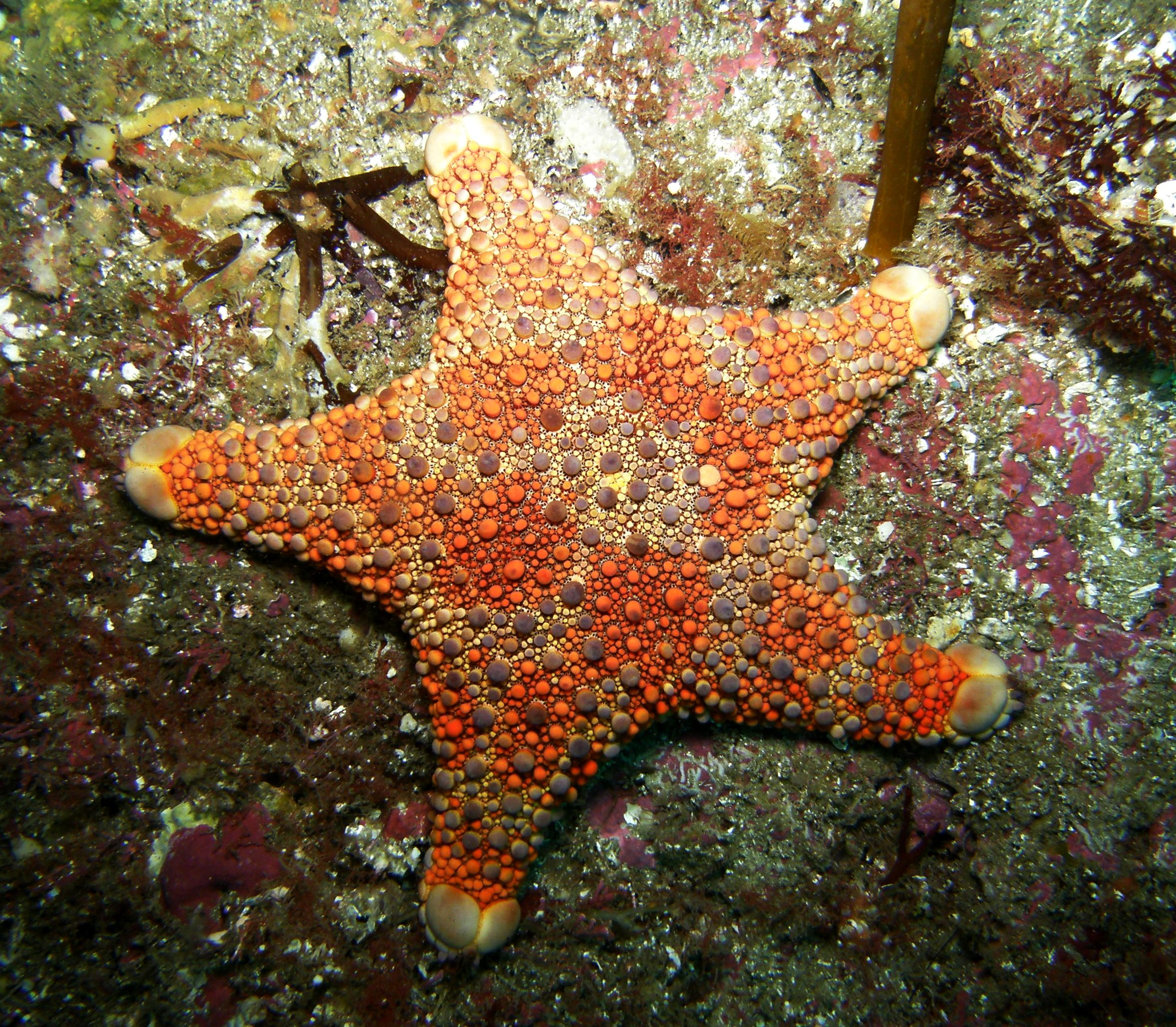

Scientific classification
- Domain: Eukaryota
- Kingdom: Animalia
- Phylum: Echinodermata
- Class: Asteroidea
- Order: Valvatida
- Family: Asterodiscididae
- Genus: Asterodiscides
- Species: A. truncatus

Binomial name
- Asterodiscides truncatus (Coleman, 1911)

Synonyms
- Asterodiscus truncatus Coleman, 1911

= Asterodiscides truncatus =

Species of sea urchin

Asterodiscides truncatus, the firebrick starfish, is a species of five-armed starfish in the family Asterodiscididae. It is native to eastern and southern Australia, the Norfolk Ridge and the Kermadec Islands of New Zealand.

== Description ==
The starfish has plates on its aboral (upper) surface arranged in a reticulate fashion with brightly coloured tubercles scattered between them. There are only a few inconspicuous marginal plates but the superomarginal plate at the end of each arm is very large. The tube feet are tipped with suckers and do not have any spicules. The tubercles vary in size and colour, making a red, purple and orange pattern on the aboral surface. There is a pair of very large tubercles at the tip of each arm.

== Distribution and habitat ==
Endemic to Australia, A. truncatus occurs on the south and east coasts, on the western end of the Norfolk Ridge and the Kermadec Islands. In southern Australia it is a deep water species found in rocky habitats at 120 m (400 ft), but in New South Wales it occurs on shallow rocky reefs in the subtidal zone.

== Ecology ==
Asterodiscides truncatus feeds by grazing on sponges and other colourful benthic organisms at the base of the kelp forest, amongst which its bright colours are inconspicuous. A commensal shrimp can sometimes be found living among the tubercles. It has been observed releasing gametes into the water column by standing on the tips of its arms to raise its body off the sea floor. However, little is known of the biology of this starfish.
