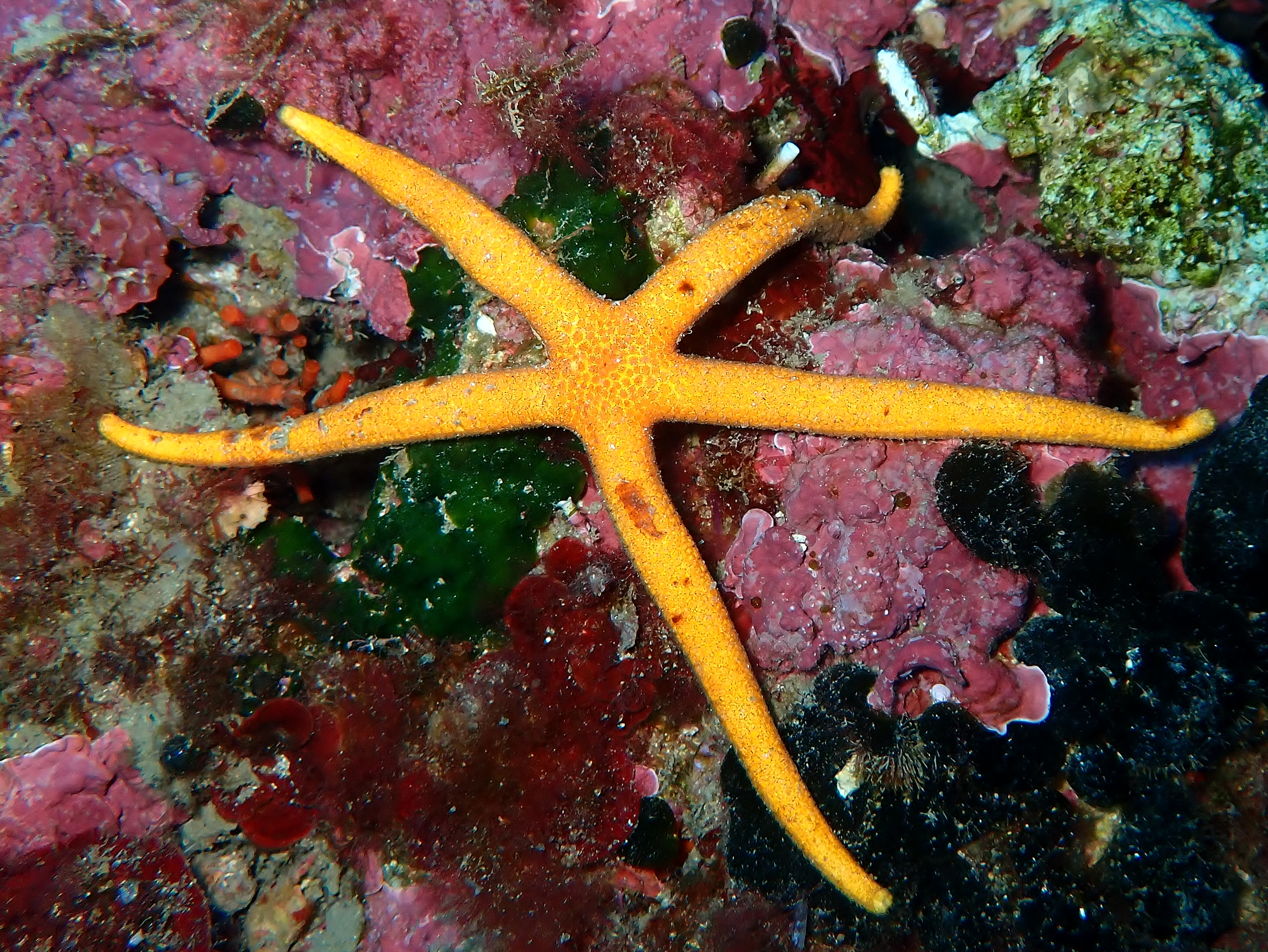
- Chaetaster longipes

Scientific classification
- Kingdom: Animalia
- Phylum: Echinodermata
- Class: Asteroidea
- Order: Valvatida
- Family: Chaetasteridae; Sladen, 1889

= Chaetasteridae =

Family of starfishes

Chaetasteridae is a family of echinoderms belonging to the order Valvatida.

Genera:

- Chaetaster Müller & Troschel, 1840
- Chaetasterina Hess, 1970
