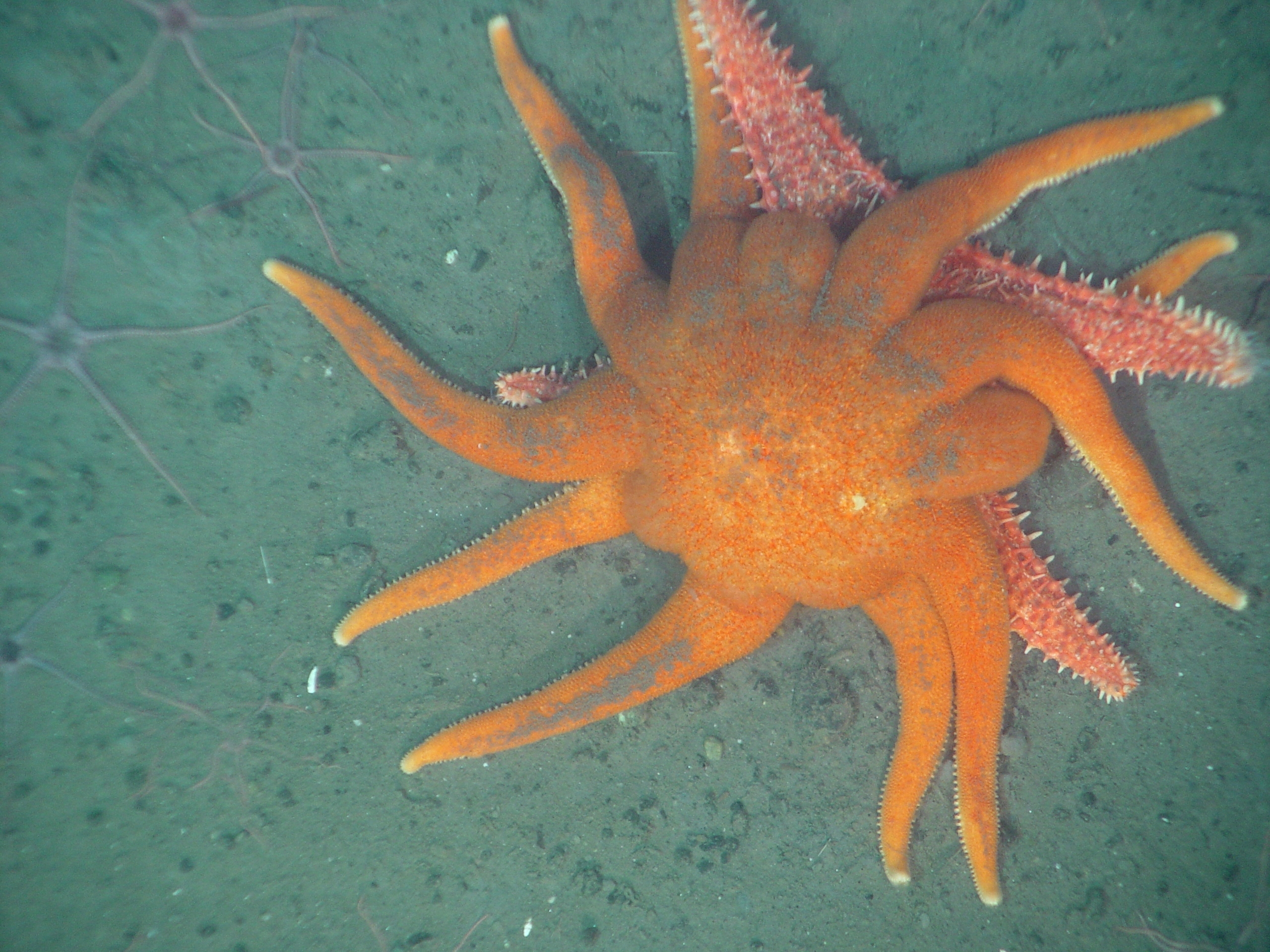
- Two Valvatida : a Solaster dawsoni attacking a Hippasteria phrygiana

Scientific classification
- Kingdom: Animalia
- Phylum: Echinodermata
- Class: Asteroidea
- Superorder: Valvatacea
- Order: Valvatida; Perrier, 1884

Families
- 18, see text

= Valvatida =

Order of starfishes

The Valvatida are an order of starfish in the class Asteroidea, which contains 695 species in 172 genera in 18 families.

== Description ==
The order encompasses both tiny species, which are only a few millimetres in diameter, like those in the genus Asterina, and species which can reach up to 75 cm, such as species in the genus Thromidia. Almost all species in this order have five arms with tube feet. This order is primarily identified by the presence of conspicuous marginal ossicles, which characterize most of the species. Most members of this order have five arms and two rows of tube feet with suckers. Some species have paxillae and in some, the main pedicellariae are clamp-like and recessed into the skeletal plates. This group includes the cushion star, and the leather star.

== Families ==
According to the World Register of Marine Species, the following families are included in Valvatida:

- Acanthasteridae Gervais, 1841
- Archasteridae Viguier, 1878
- Asterinidae Gray, 1840
- Asterodiscididae Rowe, 1977
- Asteropseidae Hotchkiss & Clark, 1976
- Chaetasteridae Sladen, 1889
- Ganeriidae Sladen, 1889
- Goniasteridae Forbes, 1841
- Leilasteridae Jangoux & Aziz, 1988
- Mithrodiidae Viguier, 1878
- Odontasteridae Verrill, 1899
- Ophidiasteridae Verrill, 1870
- Oreasteridae Fisher, 1911
- Podosphaerasteridae Fujita & Rowe, 2002
- Poraniidae Perrier, 1875
- Solasteridae Viguier, 1878
- Sphaerasteridae Schöndorf, 1906 †
- Stauranderasteridae Spencer, 1914 †
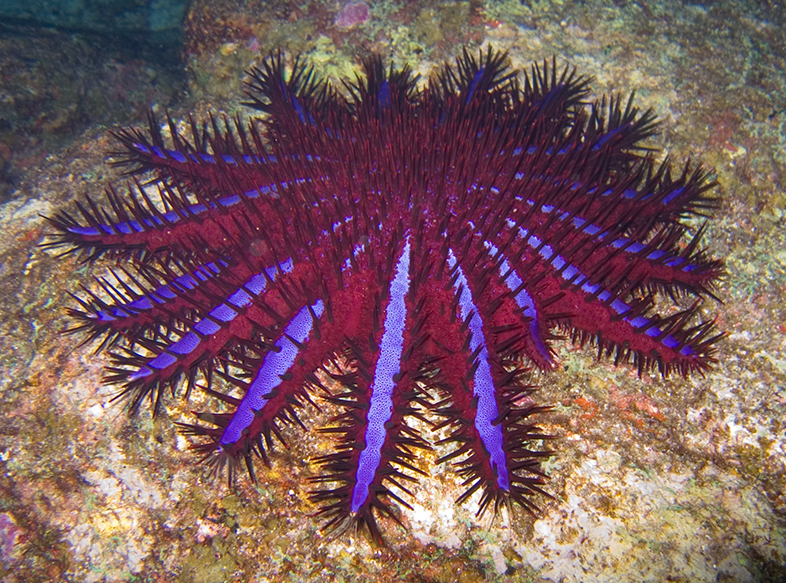
Acanthaster planci
Acanthasteridae

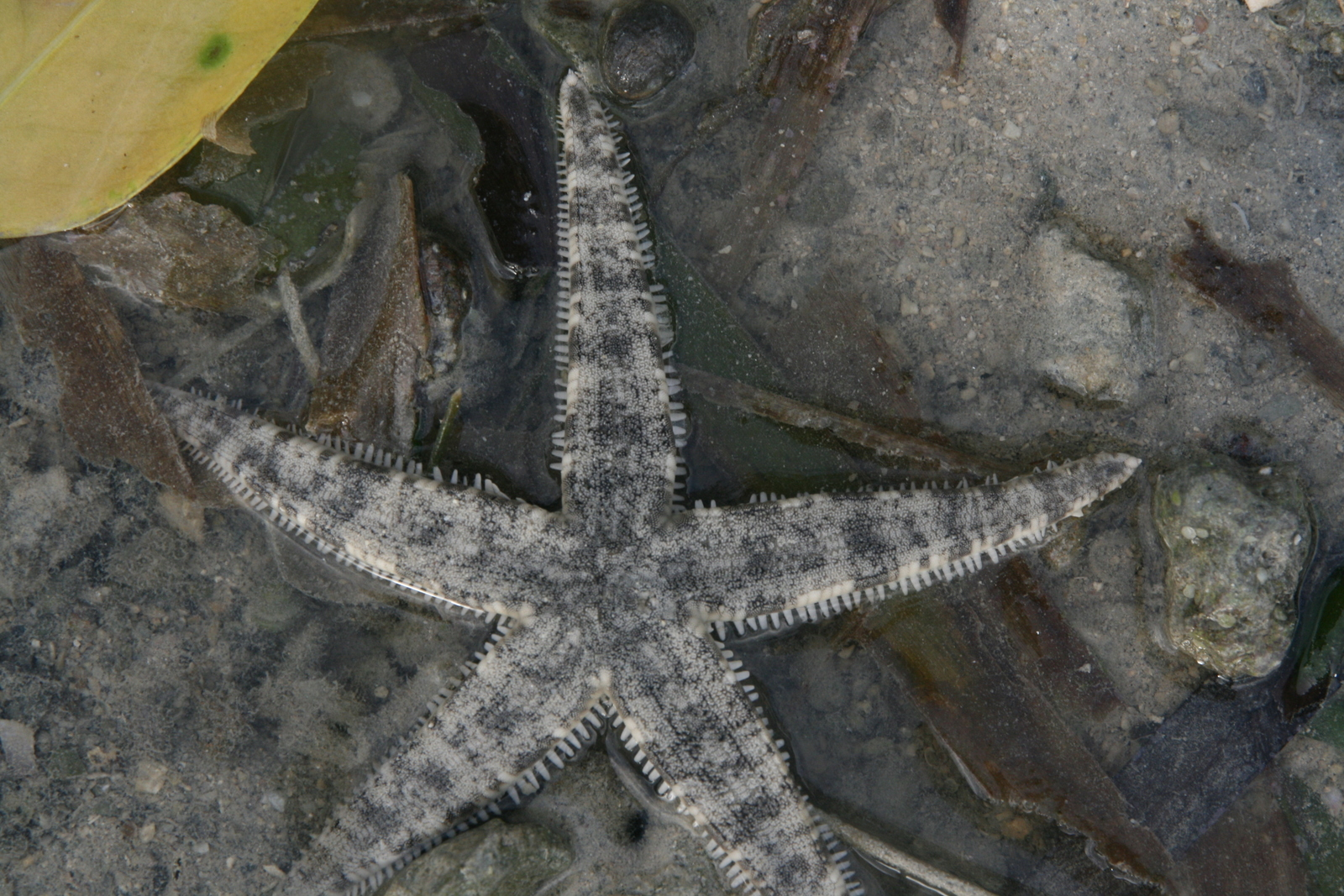
Archaster typicus
Archasteridae

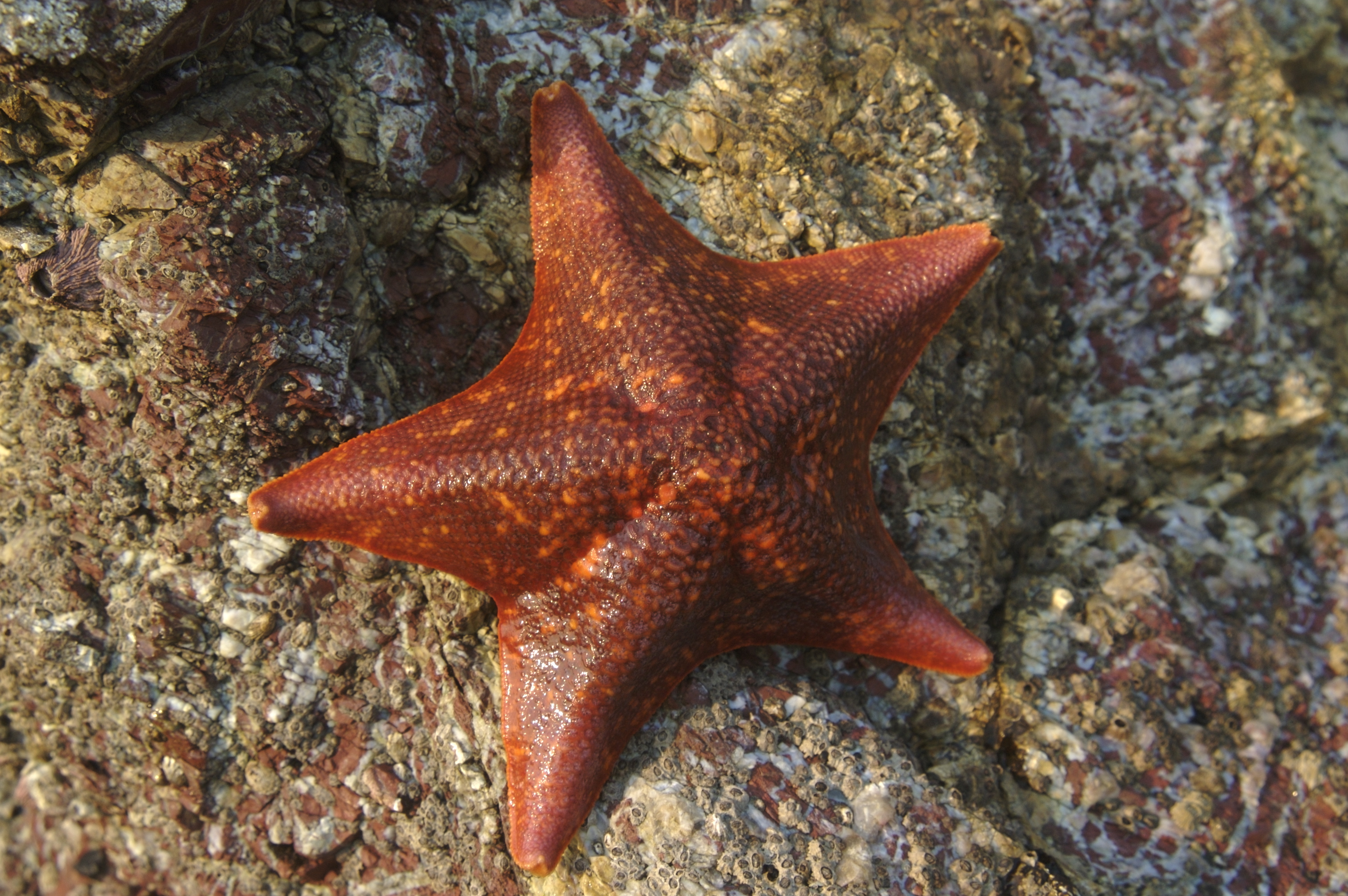
Asterina miniata
Asterinidae

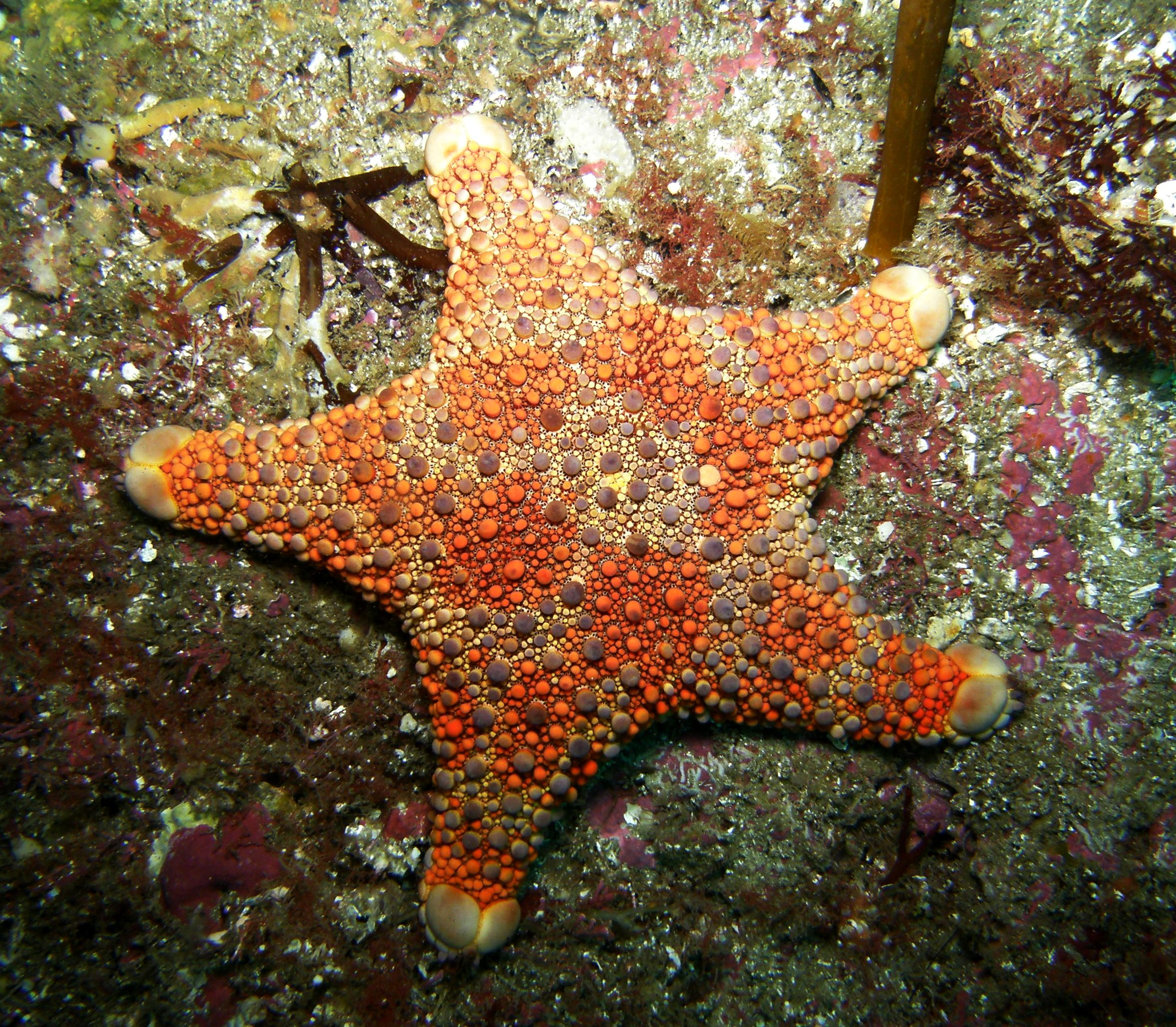
Asterodiscides truncatus
Asterodiscididae

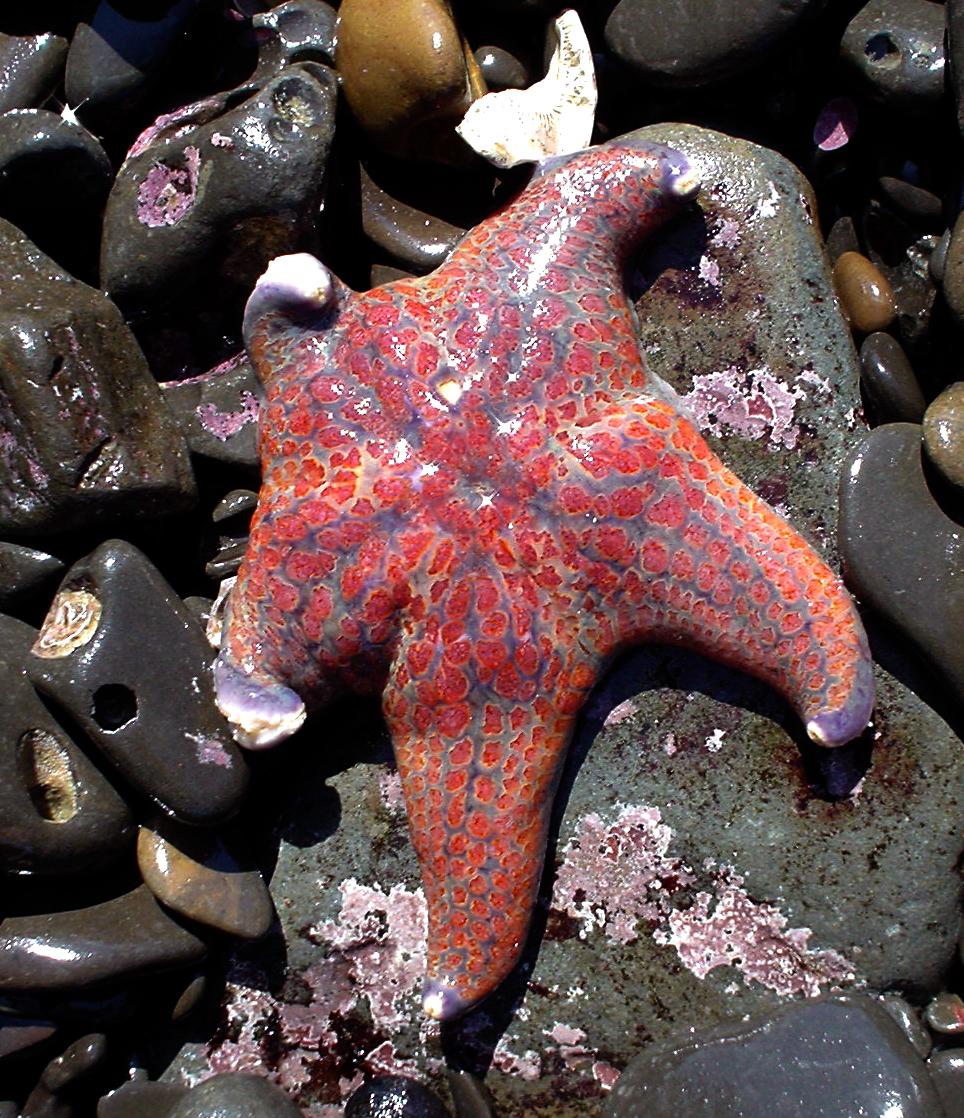
Dermasterias imbricata
Asteropseidae

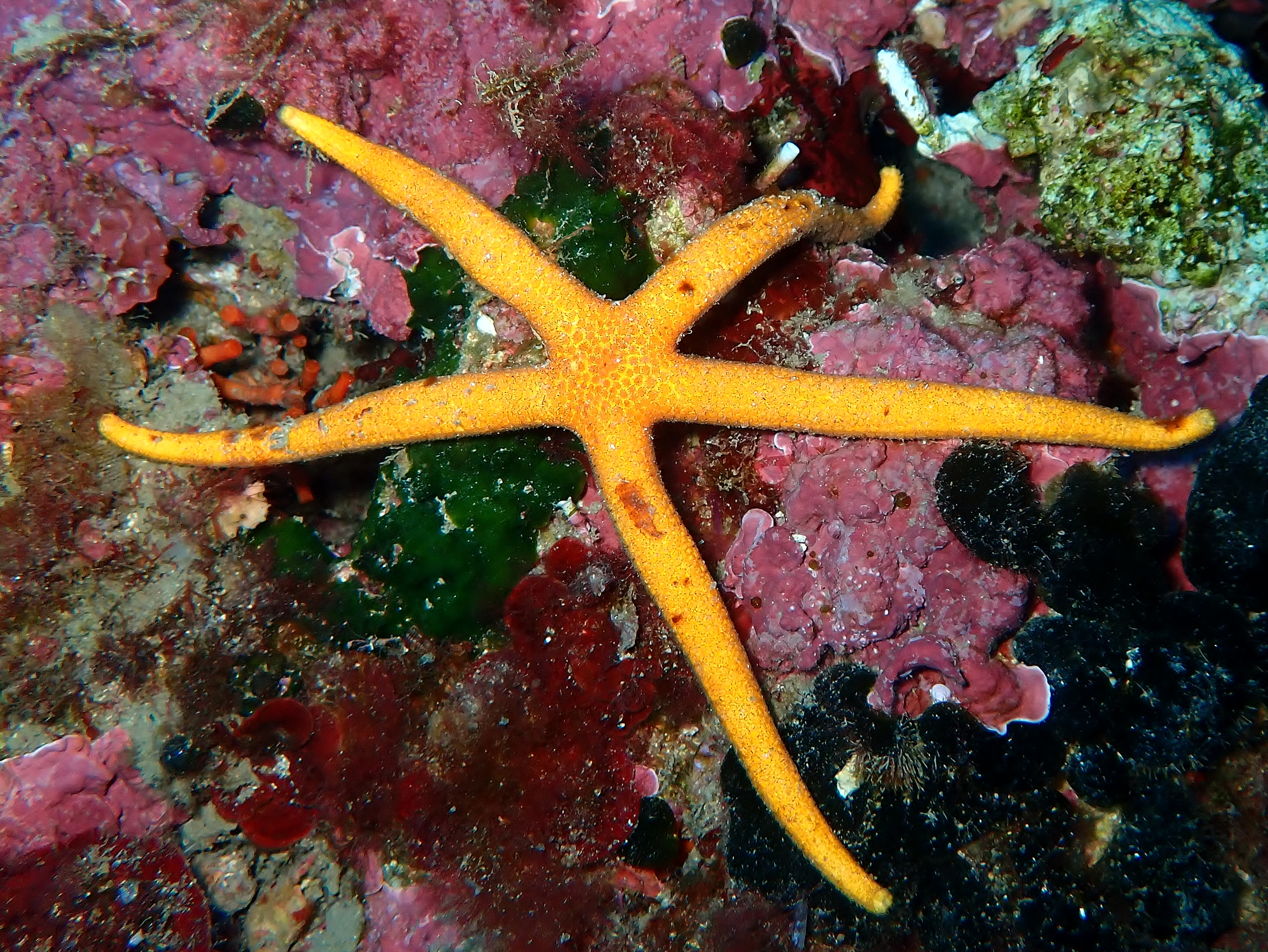
Chaetaster longipes
Chaetasteridae

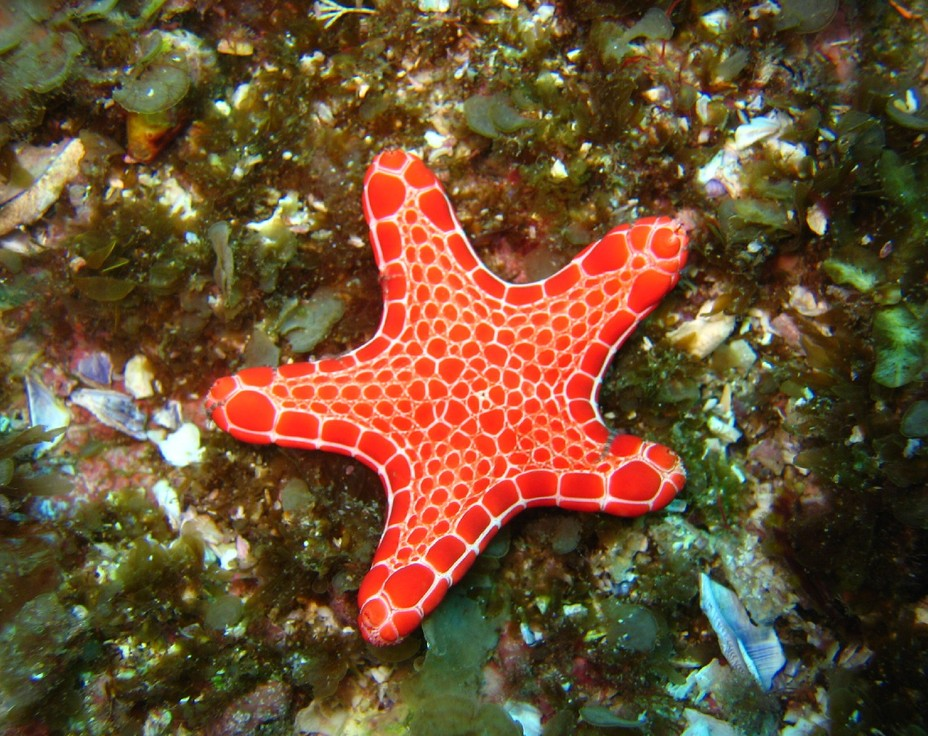
Pentagonaster dubeni
Goniasteridae

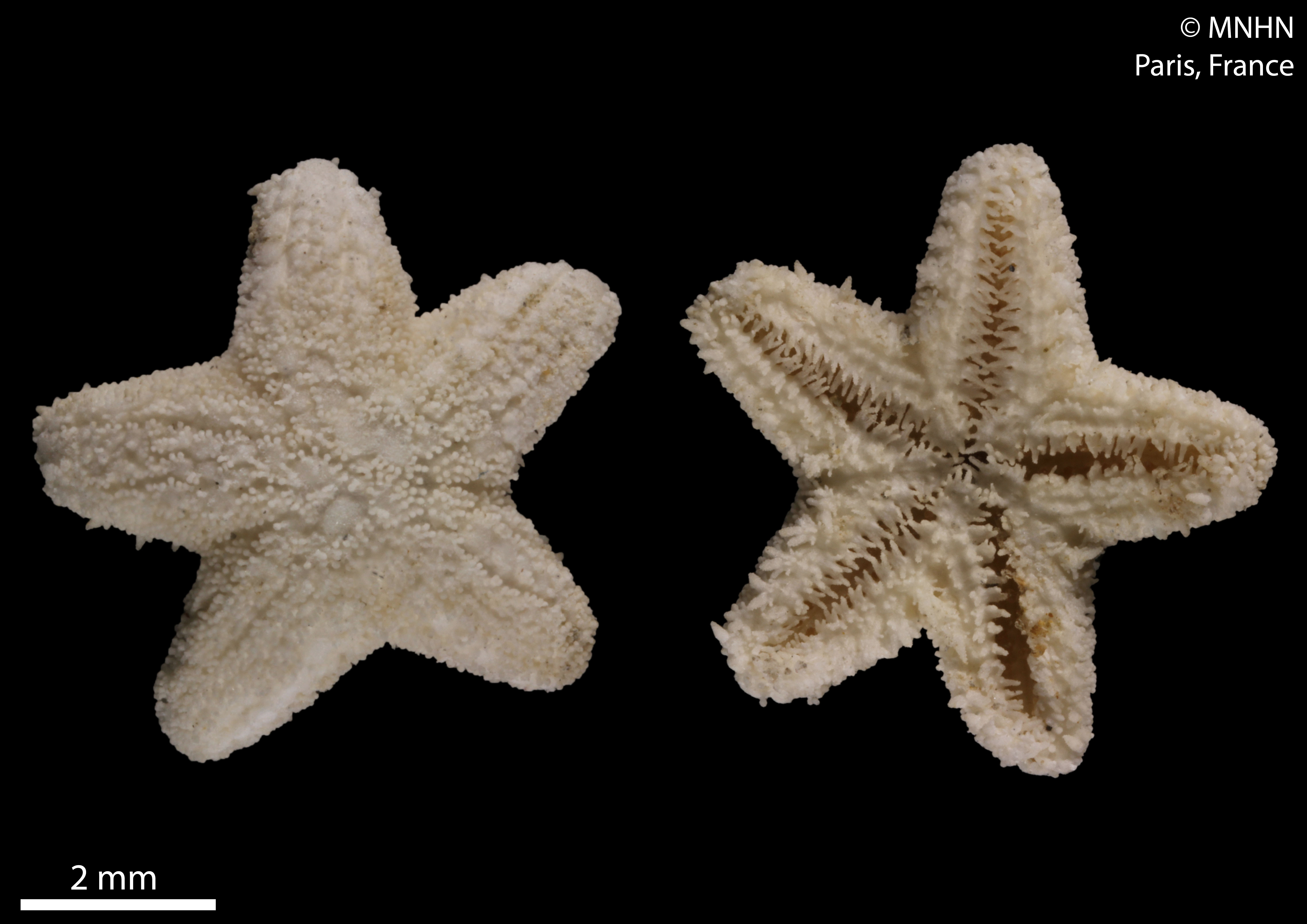
Leilaster radians
Leilasteridae

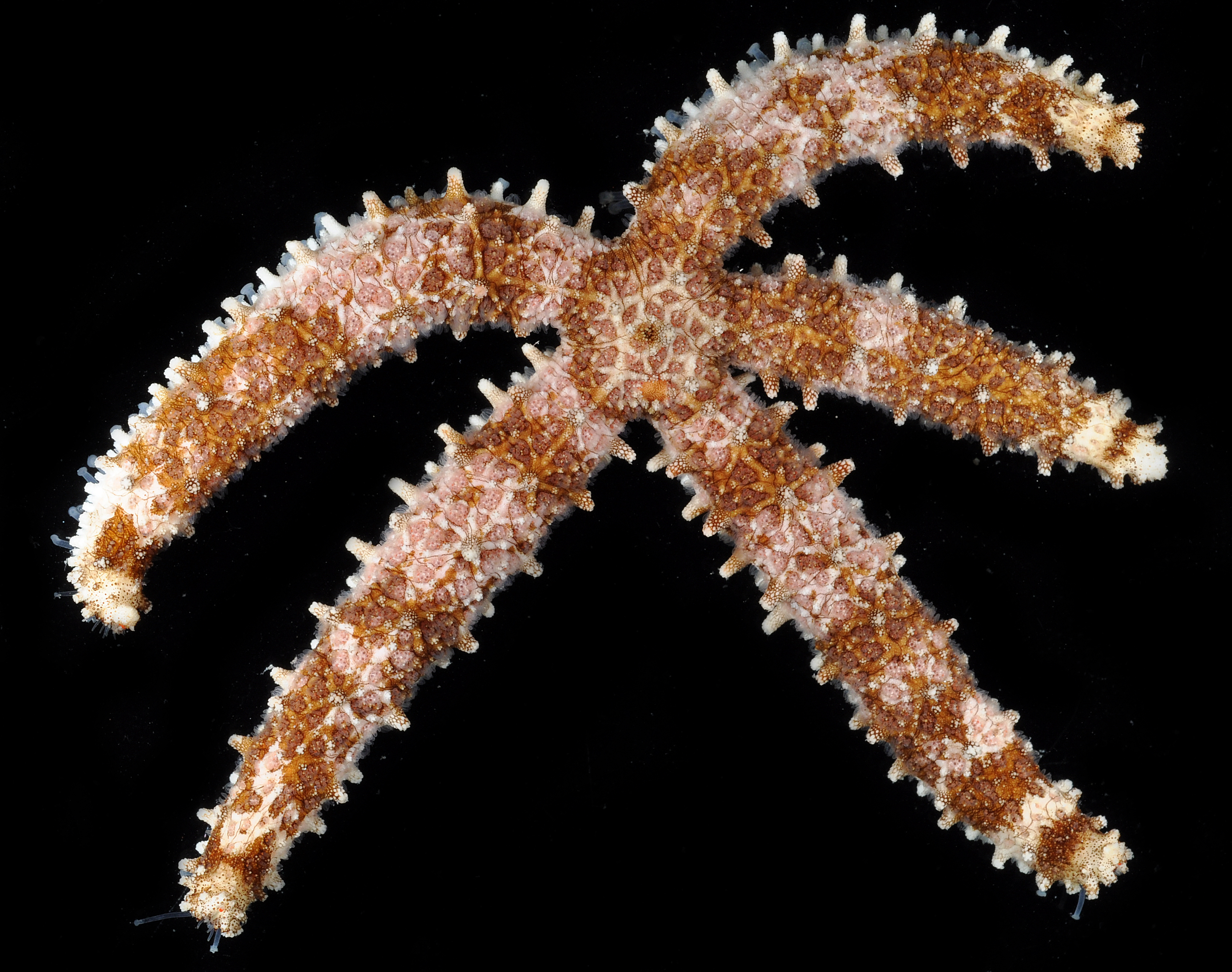
Mithrodia clavigera
Mithrodiidae

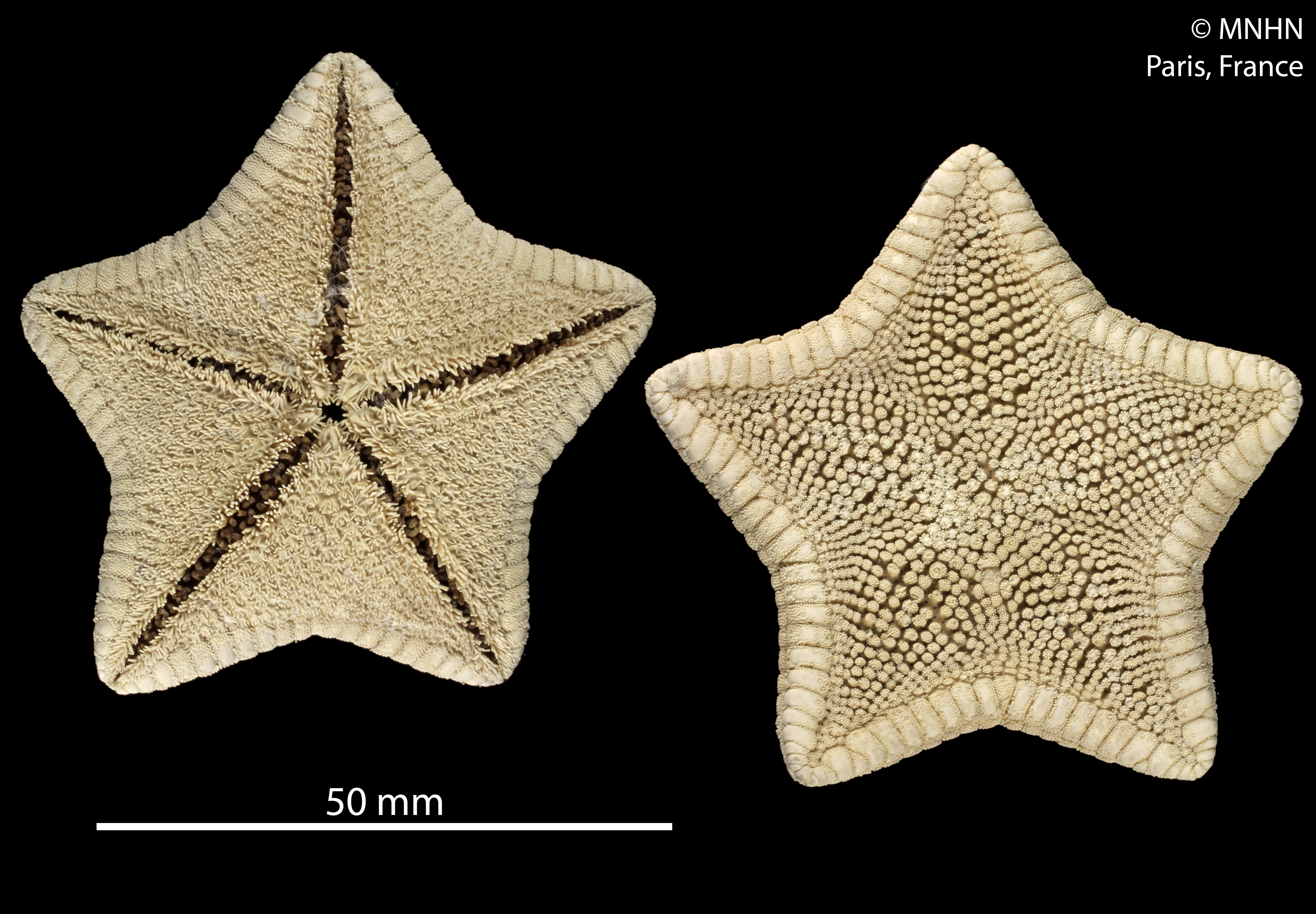
Odontaster penicillatus
Odontasteridae

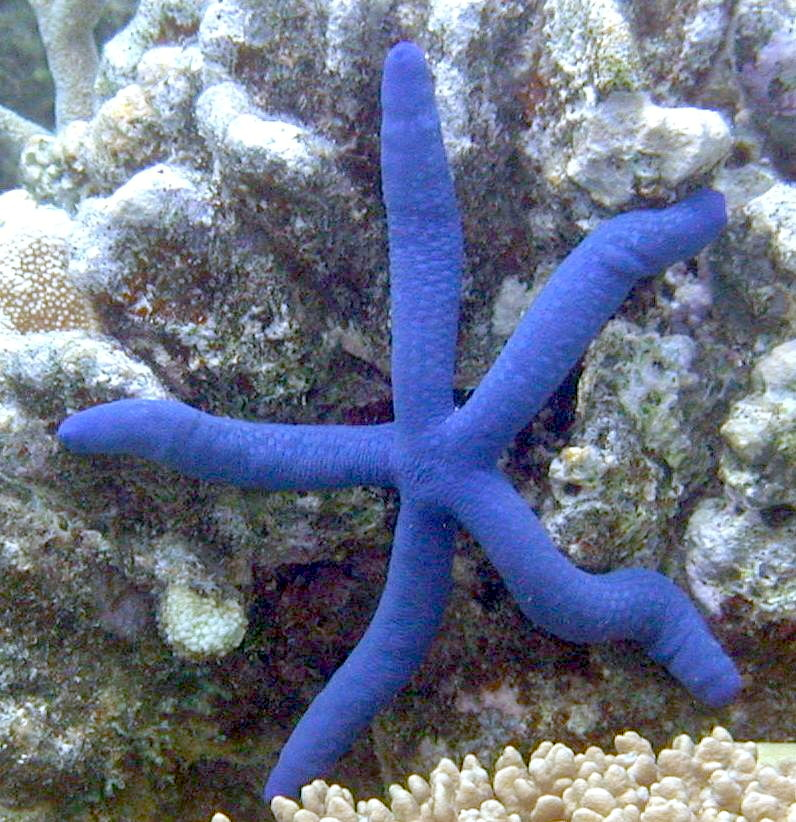
Linckia laevigata
Ophidiasteridae

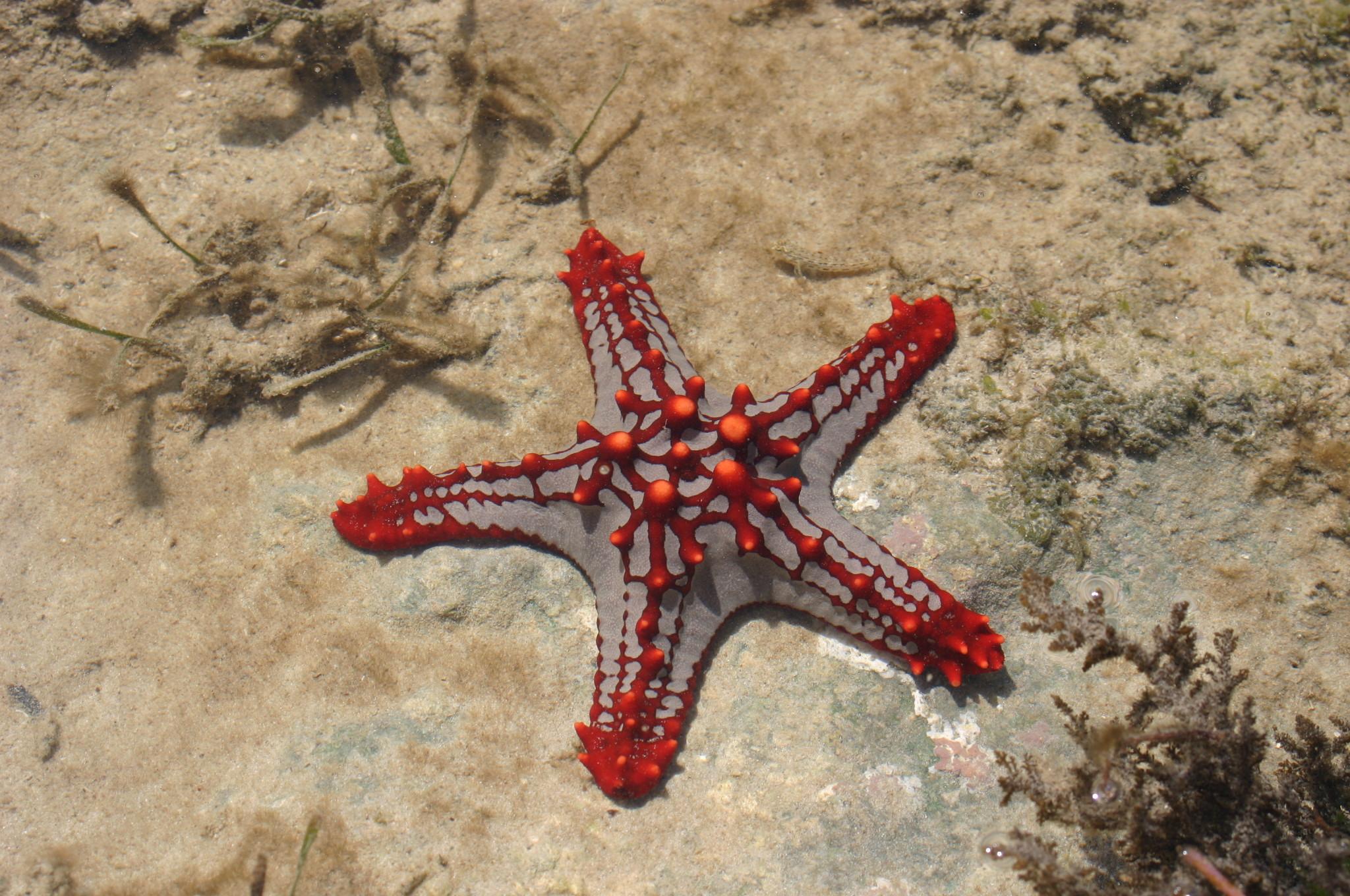
Protoreaster lincki
Oreasteridae

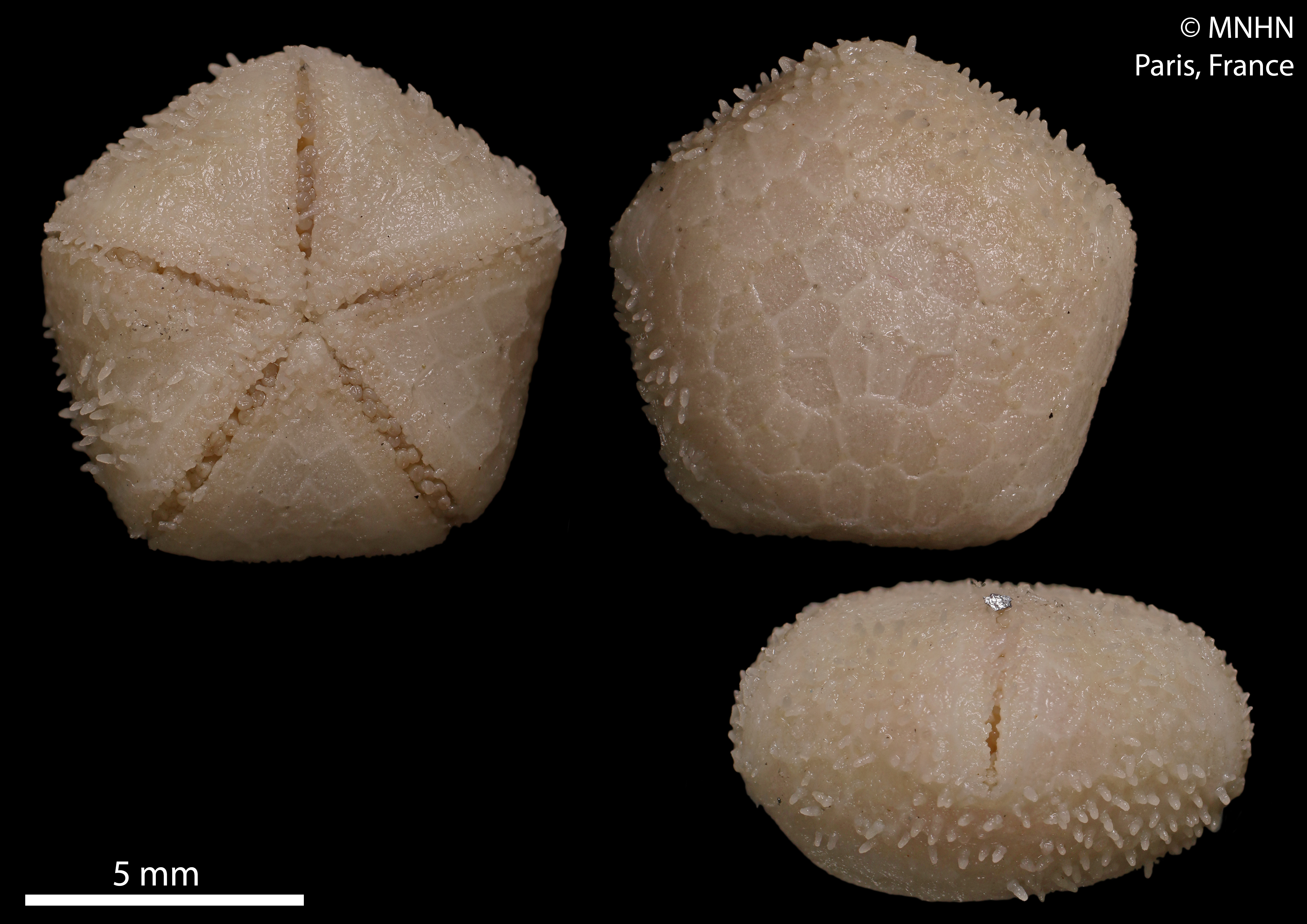
Podosphaeraster gustavei
Podosphaerasteridae

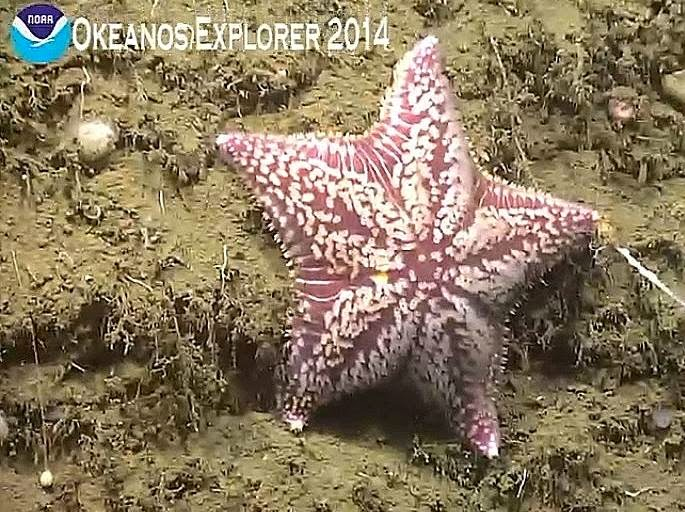
Porania pulvillus
Poraniidae

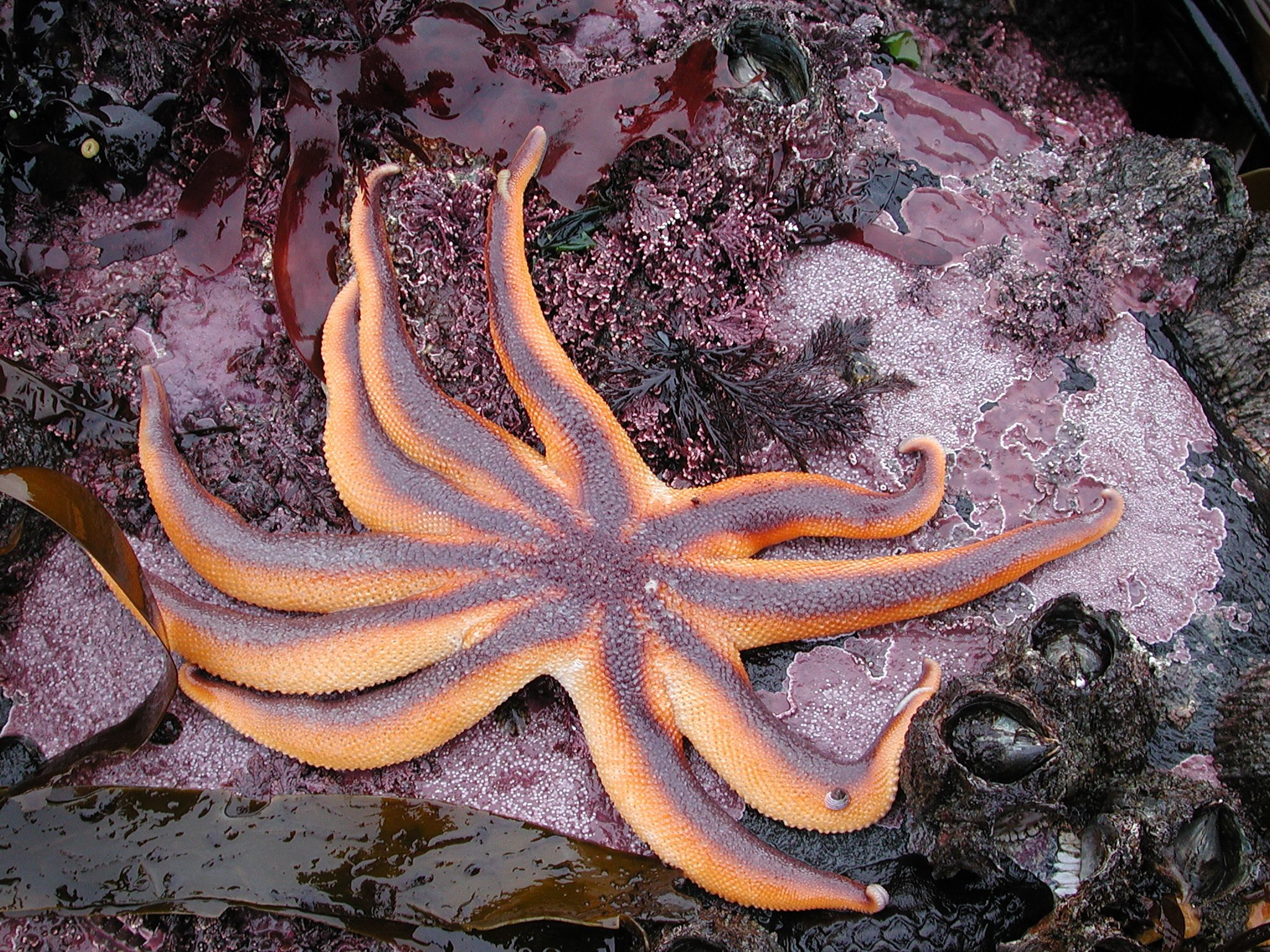
Solaster stimpsoni
Solasteridae
