= Solaster spectabilis =

Scientific classification
- Domain: Eukaryota
- Kingdom: Animalia
- Phylum: Echinodermata
- Class: Asteroidea
- Order: Valvatida
- Family: Solasteridae
- Genus: Solaster
- Species: S. spectabilis

Binomial name
- Solaster spectabilis Clark and Jewett, 2011

Species of starfish

Solaster spectabilis is an extant species of starfish described in 2011. It is indigenous to the waters surrounding the Aleutian Islands in the North Pacific Ocean.

== Bibliography ==
- Mah, Christopher (2011-10-11). "Solaster spectabilis Clark & Jewett, 2011". World Asteroidea Database.
- "Solaster spectabilis Clark & Jewett, 2011". World Register of Marine Species. 2012-08-04.
