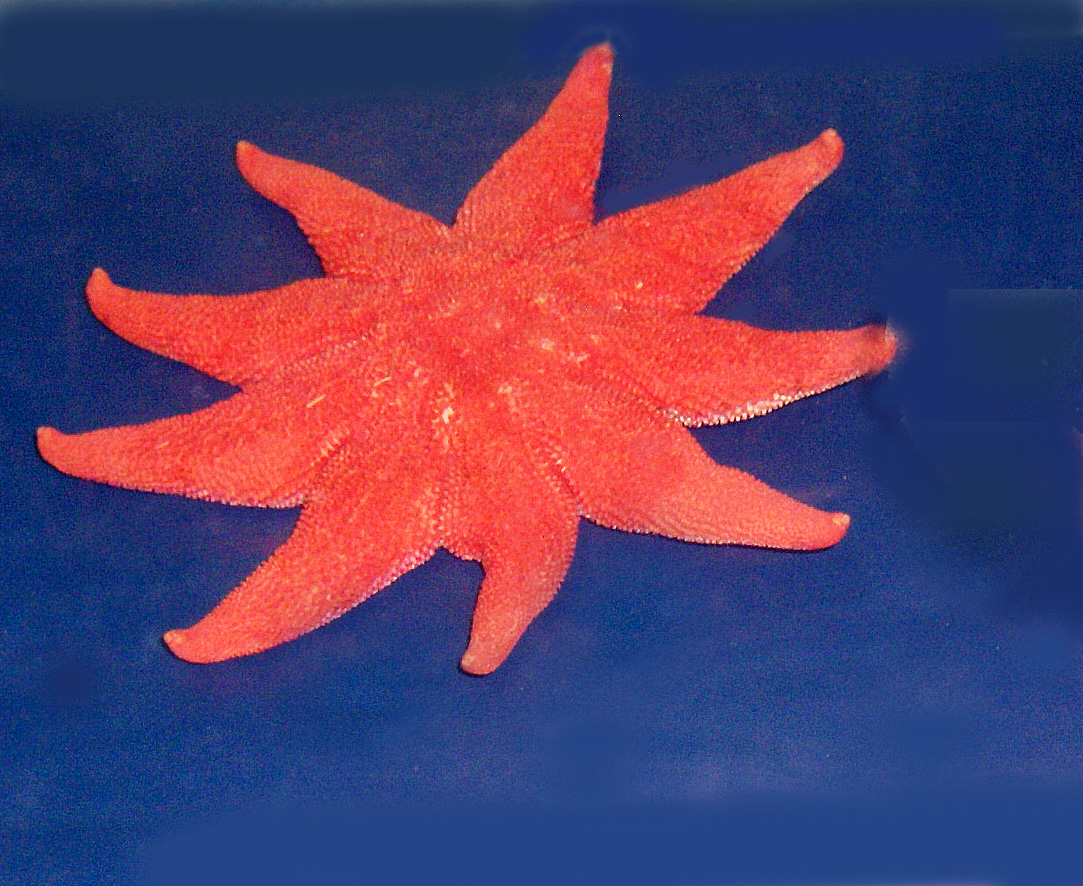

Scientific classification
- Kingdom: Animalia
- Phylum: Echinodermata
- Class: Asteroidea
- Order: Valvatida
- Family: Solasteridae
- Genus: Solaster
- Species: S. endeca

Binomial name
- Solaster endeca (Linnaeus, 1771)

Synonyms
- Asterias alboverrucosa Brandt, 1835; Asterias aspera O.F. Müller, 1776; Asterias endeca Linnaeus, 1771; Asterias rumphii Parelius, 1768; Solaster endeca decemradiata Sladen, 1889; Solaster galaxides Verrill, 1909; Solaster intermedius Sluiter, 1895; Stellonia endeca L. Agassiz, 1836

= Solaster endeca =

Species of starfish

The purple sunstar, northern sunstar, or smooth sun star, Solaster endeca, is a species of starfish in the family Solasteridae.

== Description ==
Solaster endeca normally grow to an adult size of about 20 centimetres (7.9 inches) but in some cases reach 40 cm (16 in). It is a robust species with 9 or 10 arms (occasionally any number from seven to 13) set around a large disc. The aboral (upper) surface is formed of calcareous plates densely covered with paxillae, peg-like projections covered in tiny spinelets. No pedicellariae are present, but groups of two to three gills are found between the plates. On the oral (under) surface, the row of plates on either side of the ambulacral groove bear two or three spines and several rows of shorter spines, with two rows of tube feet. S. endeca ranges in colour from greyish-cream to pinkish-purple. The arms are often turned up at the tips, showing the pale oral surface. It can be confused with Crossaster papposus , the only British species with a similar number of arms, but S. endeca has a smoother aboral surface.

== Distribution and habitat ==
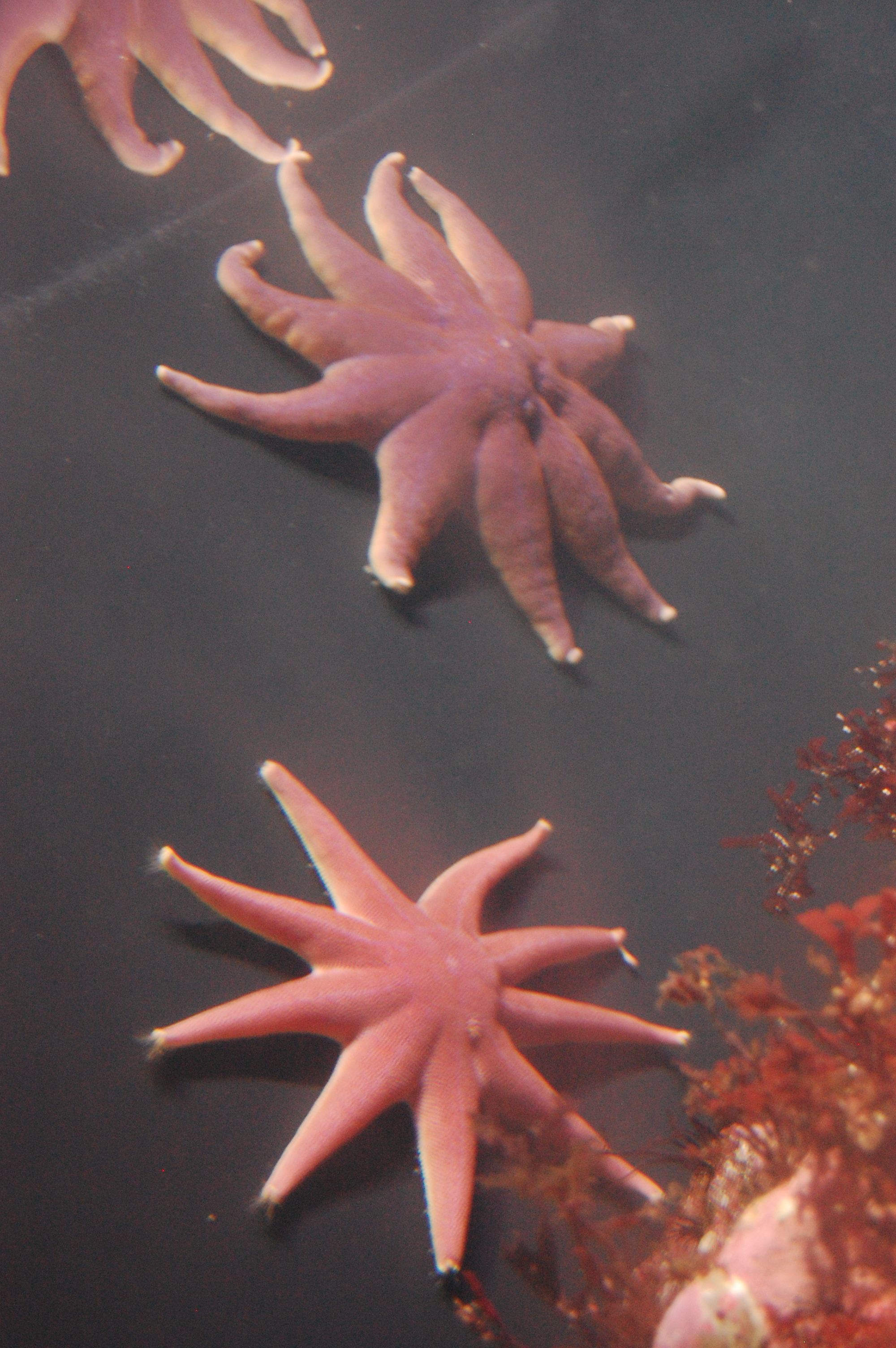
S. endeca at the New England Aquarium, Boston

The purple sun star occurs in the northeastern Atlantic Ocean and the North Sea at depths to 450 m (1,480 ft). Its typical habitats are muddy sand, gravel, or rocky areas with deposited sediment. It is found in both sheltered and fairly exposed locations. It also has a circumboreal distribution and is found round the coasts of Greenland, northeastern Canada, and the East Coast of the United States as far south as the Gulf of Maine. In the Baltic Sea it is a vulnerable species. It also occurs in the northeastern Pacific Ocean between northern Alaska and Puget Sound.

== Biology ==
S. endeca is a predator. In the Atlantic Ocean, it feeds on other starfish and bivalve molluscs, but in the Pacific, its diet is mainly sea cucumbers and other invertebrates.

In Britain, breeding takes place in the spring. Over a period of about a week, the female lays several thousand eggs in batches. These rise to the surface of the water where they are fertilised by sperm liberated by the male. The developing larvae become less buoyant after three days, feed on the yolks of their eggs, swim with cilia, and develop a pair of larval arms. After about 18 days, they sink to the sea bed, where each one attaches itself to the substrate with a sucker. Here it undergoes metamorphosis during which it develops a disc and first five and then more arms, a pair of tube feet, relatively long spines, red eyespots on the tips of the arms, a mouth, and an anus. After six weeks, the sucker is resorbed and the juvenile starfish begins to move about with its tube feet.
