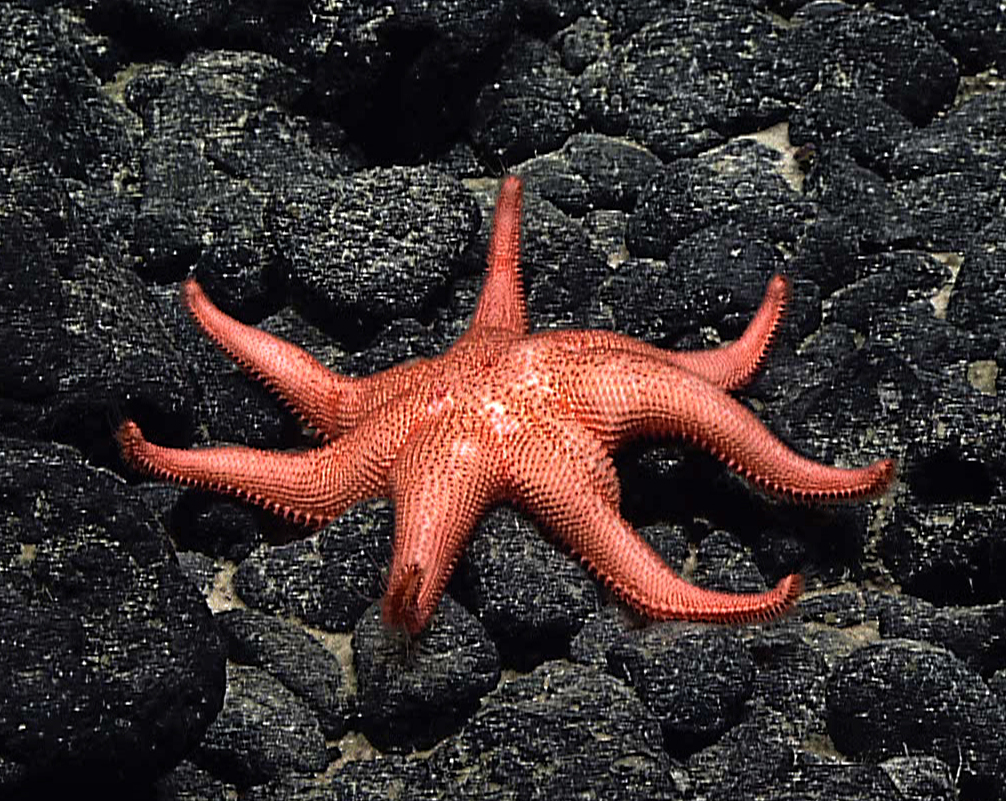

Scientific classification
- Kingdom: Animalia
- Phylum: Echinodermata
- Class: Asteroidea
- Order: Valvatida
- Family: Solasteridae
- Genus: Solaster
- Species: S. namakae

Binomial name
- Solaster namakae Mah, 2022

= Solaster namakae =

Species of starfish

Solaster namakae is a species of starfish within the family Solasteridae. The species occurs off the Hawaiian Islands at depths of 1169 to 1979 meters. The species name namakae is named after Nāmaka, the Hawaiian goddess of the ocean. It has eight arms with a thick dermis, covering the starfishes surface. The color of the body can vary from white to dark orange.
