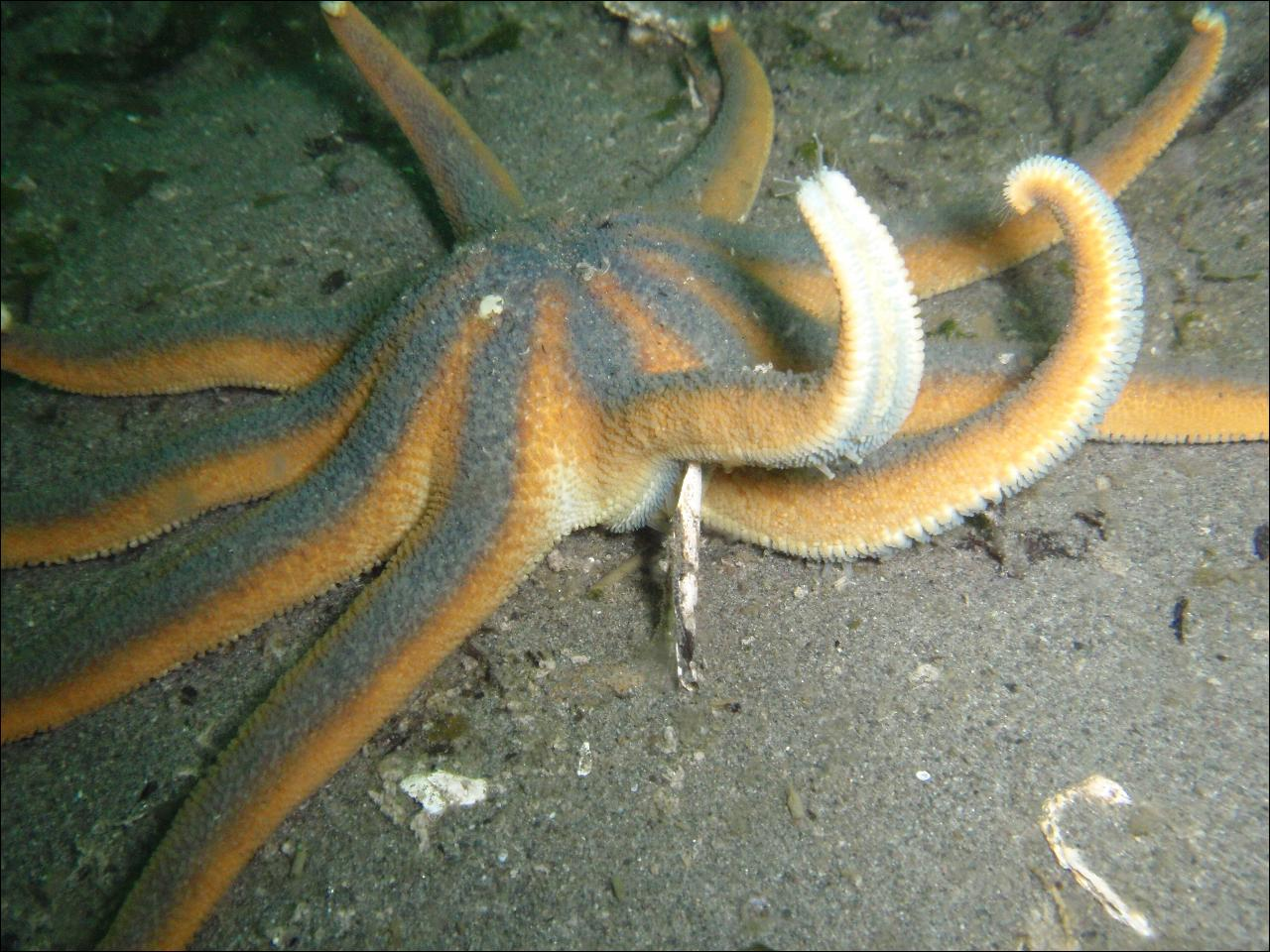

Scientific classification
- Domain: Eukaryota
- Kingdom: Animalia
- Phylum: Echinodermata
- Class: Asteroidea
- Order: Valvatida
- Family: Solasteridae
- Genus: Solaster
- Species: S. stimpsoni

Binomial name
- Solaster stimpsoni Verrill, 1880

Synonyms
- Asterias decemradiatus Brandt, 1835; Crossaster vancouverensis de Loriol, 1897; Solaster constellatus Verrill, 1909; Solaster decemradiatus (Brandt, 1835)

= Solaster stimpsoni =

Species of starfish

Solaster stimpsoni, common names Stimpson's sun star, sun star, orange sun star, striped sunstar, and sun sea star, is a species of starfish in the family Solasteridae.

It was first described by Addison Emery Verrill in 1880.

== Description ==
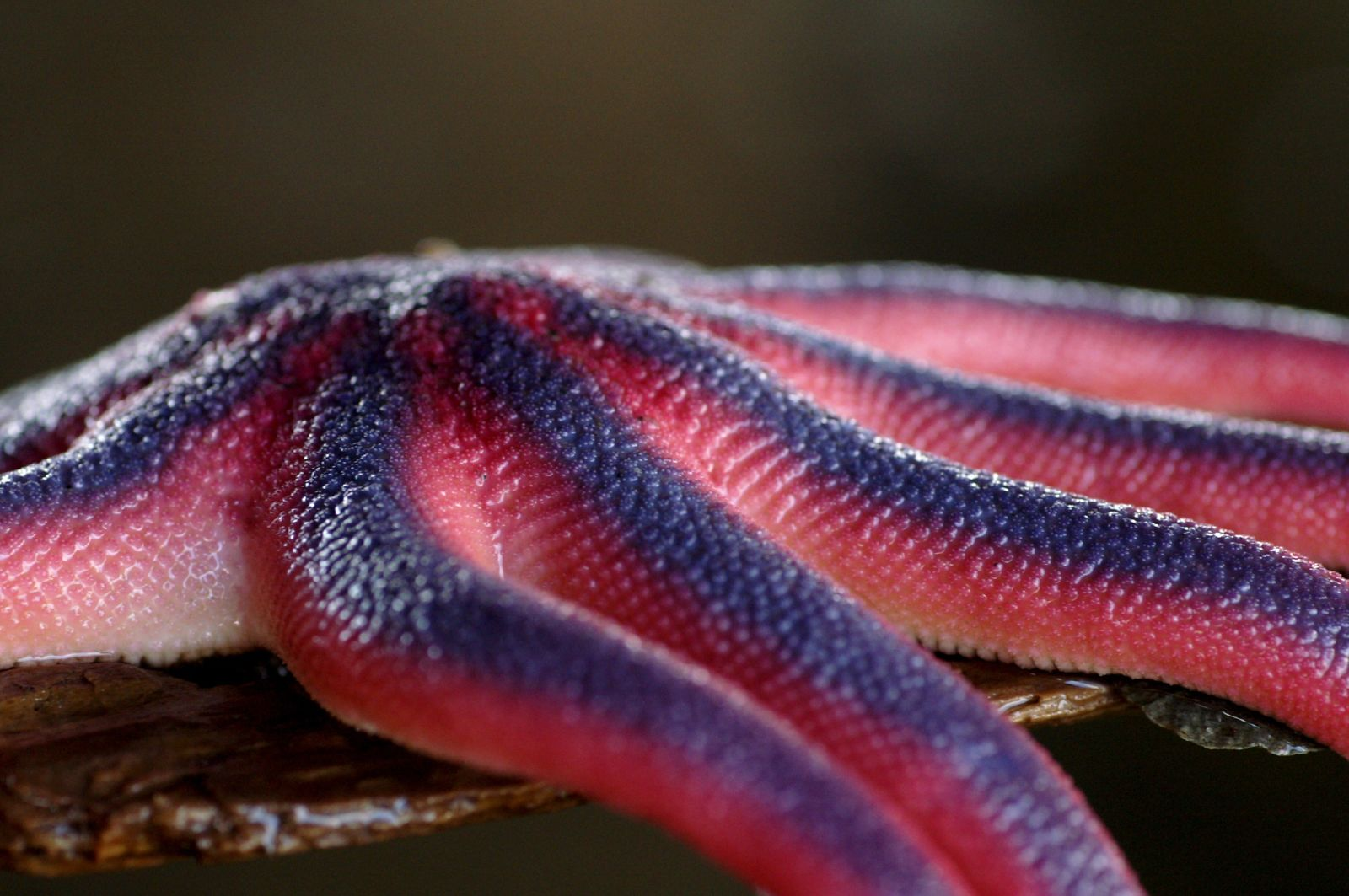

Solaster stimpsoni is a large species, growing up to 50 cm in diameter. It can have 8 to 12 arms, but usually has 10. The aboral surface has a distinctive reddish orange colour and is covered with thick paxillae. The arms are long, slender, and tapering, each with a dark, purplish-grey contrasting stripe, running from the centre of the body to the tip. They contain no pedicellariae. The underside of the arms have two rows of tube feet. Members of the class Asteroidea exhibit both asexual and sexual means of reproduction. Life cycle: Embryos hatch into planktonic larvae and later metamorphose into pentamerous juveniles which develop into young sea stars with stubby arms.

== Distribution ==
This species is found in the seas of Japan, and along the western coast of the United States, from central California, to as far north as Alaska.

== Habitat ==
Solaster stimpsoni usually lives on rocky surfaces in the subtidal, and occasionally the low inter-tidal zones, at depths from 0 to 610 meters.

== Diet ==
This starfish feeds on various small sea cucumbers, such as Cucumaria miniata, Cucumaria curata, Eupentacta quinquesemita, Eupentacta pseudoquinquesemita, and Psolus chitonoides. It also eats brachiopods, ascidians, or sea pens.

== Predators ==
Solaster stimpsoni is eaten by a close relative, Solaster dawsoni, the morning sunstar.
