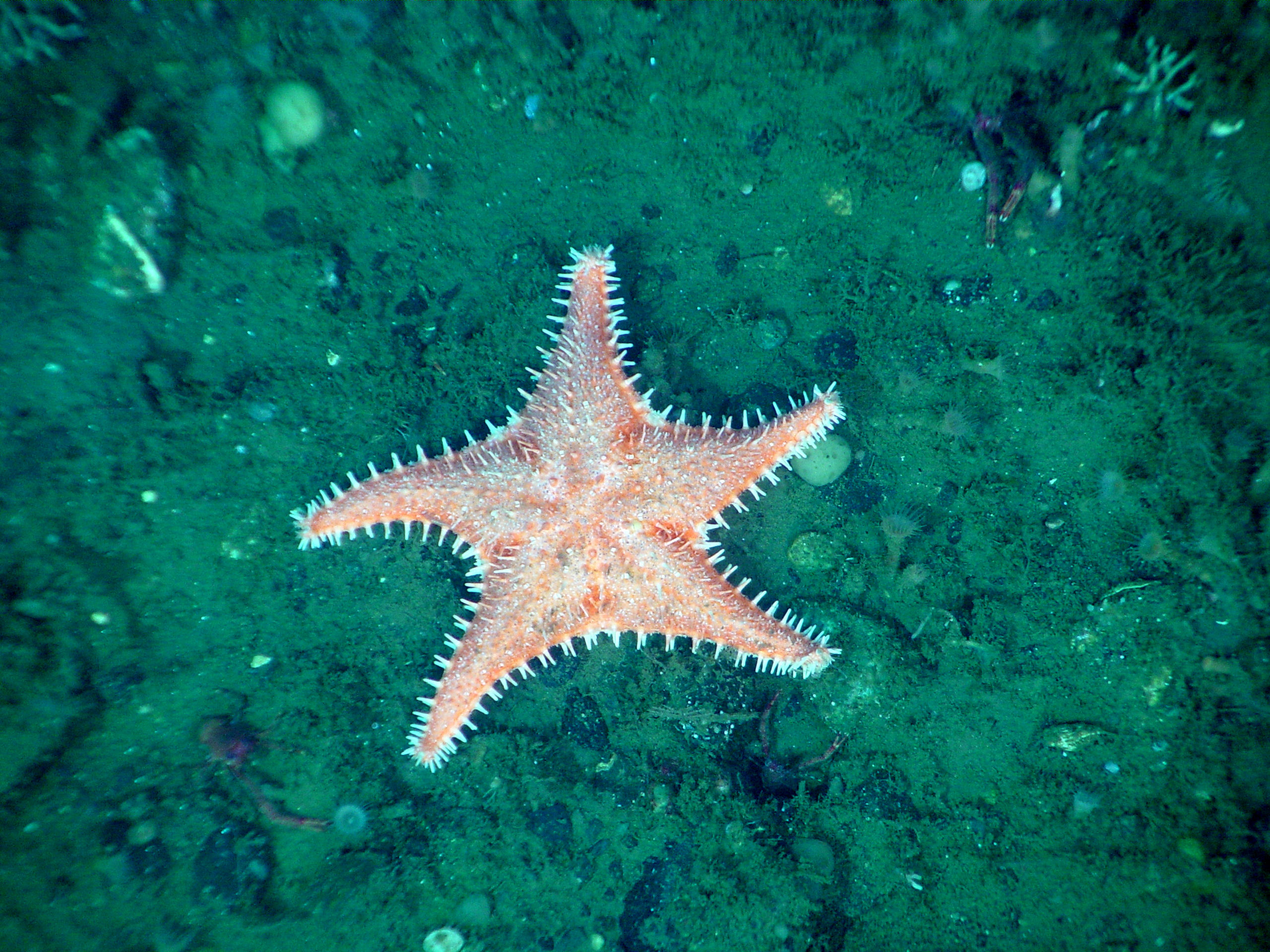
- Hippasteria phrygiana

Scientific classification
- Kingdom: Animalia
- Phylum: Echinodermata
- Class: Asteroidea
- Order: Valvatida
- Family: Goniasteridae
- Subfamily: Hippasterinae
- Genus: Hippasteria; Gray, 1840

Synonyms
- Hippasteria (Euhippasteria) Dons, 1938; Hippasteria (Nehippasteria) Dons, 1938; Cryptopeltaster Fisher, 1905

= Hippasteria =

Genus of starfishes

Hippasteria is one of 70 genera of sea stars in the diverse family Goniasteridae.

== Description and characteristics ==
These sea stars are regular, five-armed starfishes, with a large and flattened central disc. Most of the species in this genus live in deep seas, where they seem to be predators of deep sea coral and cnidarians.

The species Hippasteria phrygiana may be one of the most widely distributed species : it is present in the 3 main oceanic basins.

== List of species ==
According to the World Register of Marine Species (WoRMS), the genus Hippasteria is composed of the following twelve species:

- Hippasteria californica Fisher, 1905
- Hippasteria falklandica Fisher, 1940
- Hippasteria heathi Fisher, 1905
- Hippasteria imperialis Goto, 1914
- Hippasteria leiopelta Fisher, 1910
- Hippasteria lepidonotus (Fisher, 1905)
- Hippasteria magellanica Perrier, 1888
- Hippasteria mcknighti Mah, Neill, Eleaume & Foltz 2014
- Hippasteria muscipula Mah, Neill, Eleaume & Foltz 2014
- Hippasteria nozawai Goto, 1914
- Hippasteria phrygiana (Parelius, 1768)
- Hippasteria tiburoni Mah, Neill, Eleaume & Foltz 2014
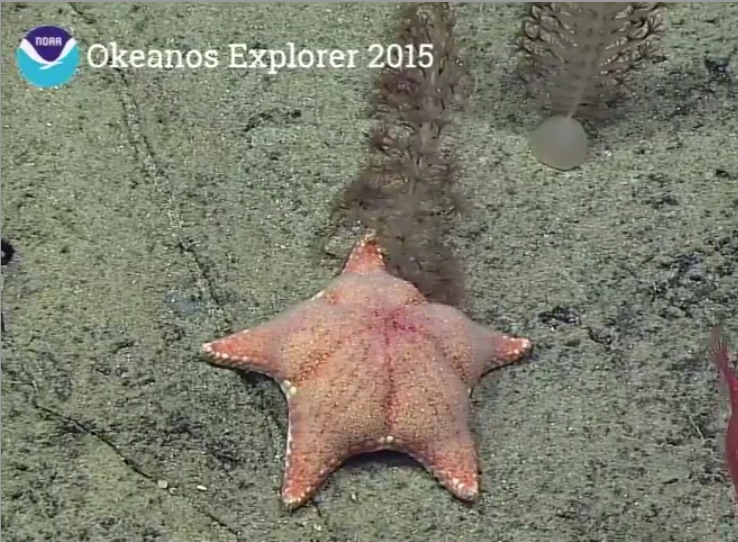
Hippasteria imperialis

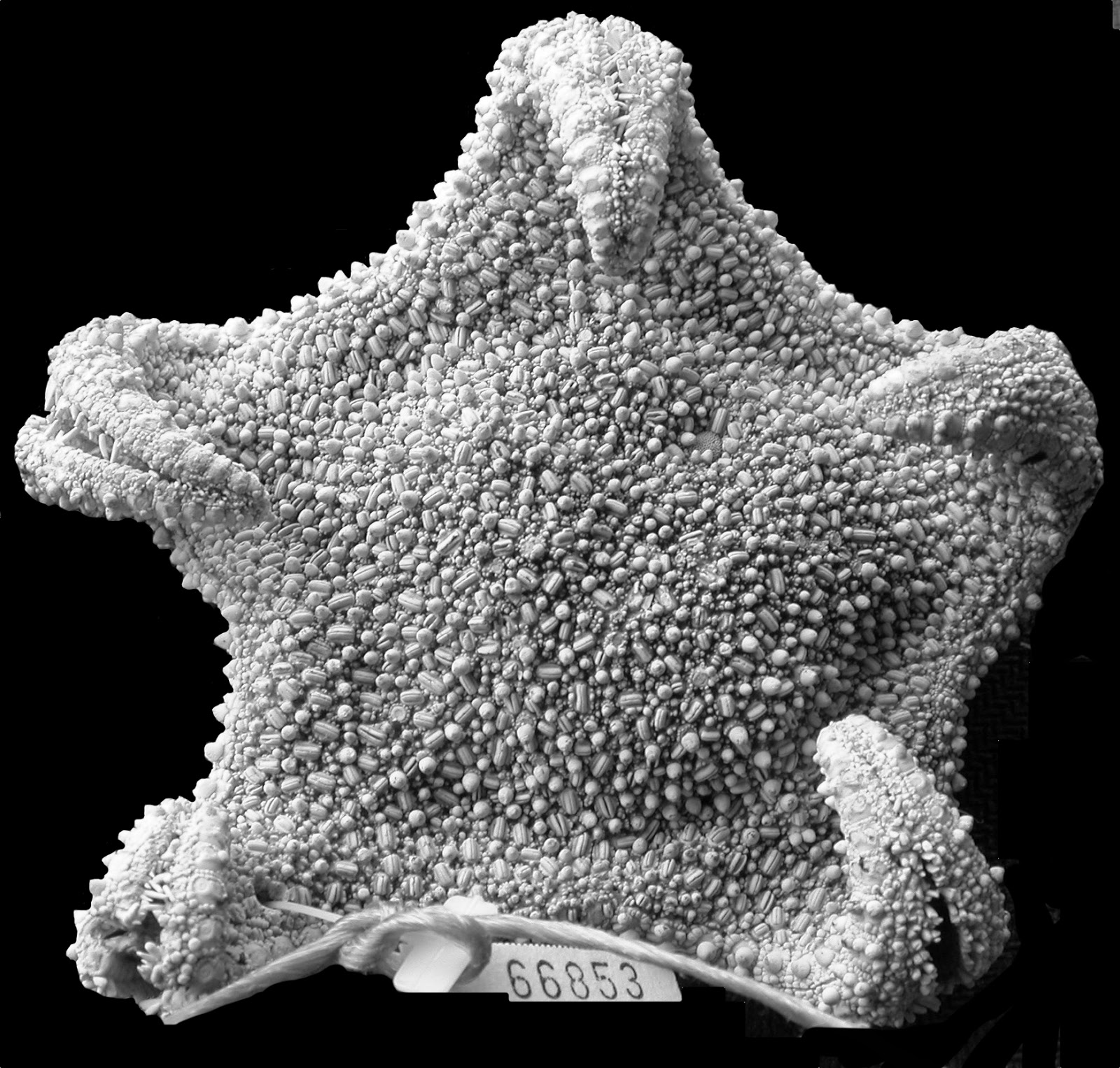
Hippasteria mcknighti

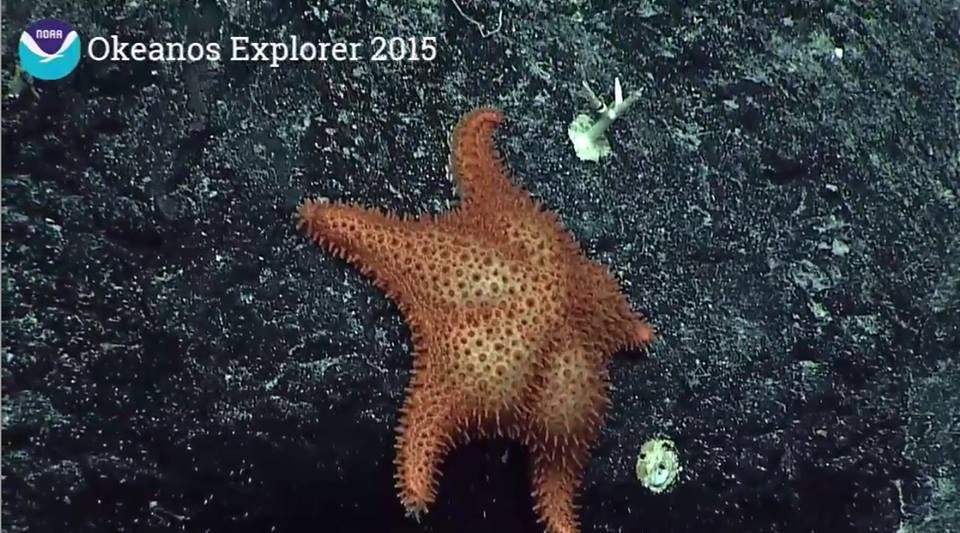
Hippasteria muscipula

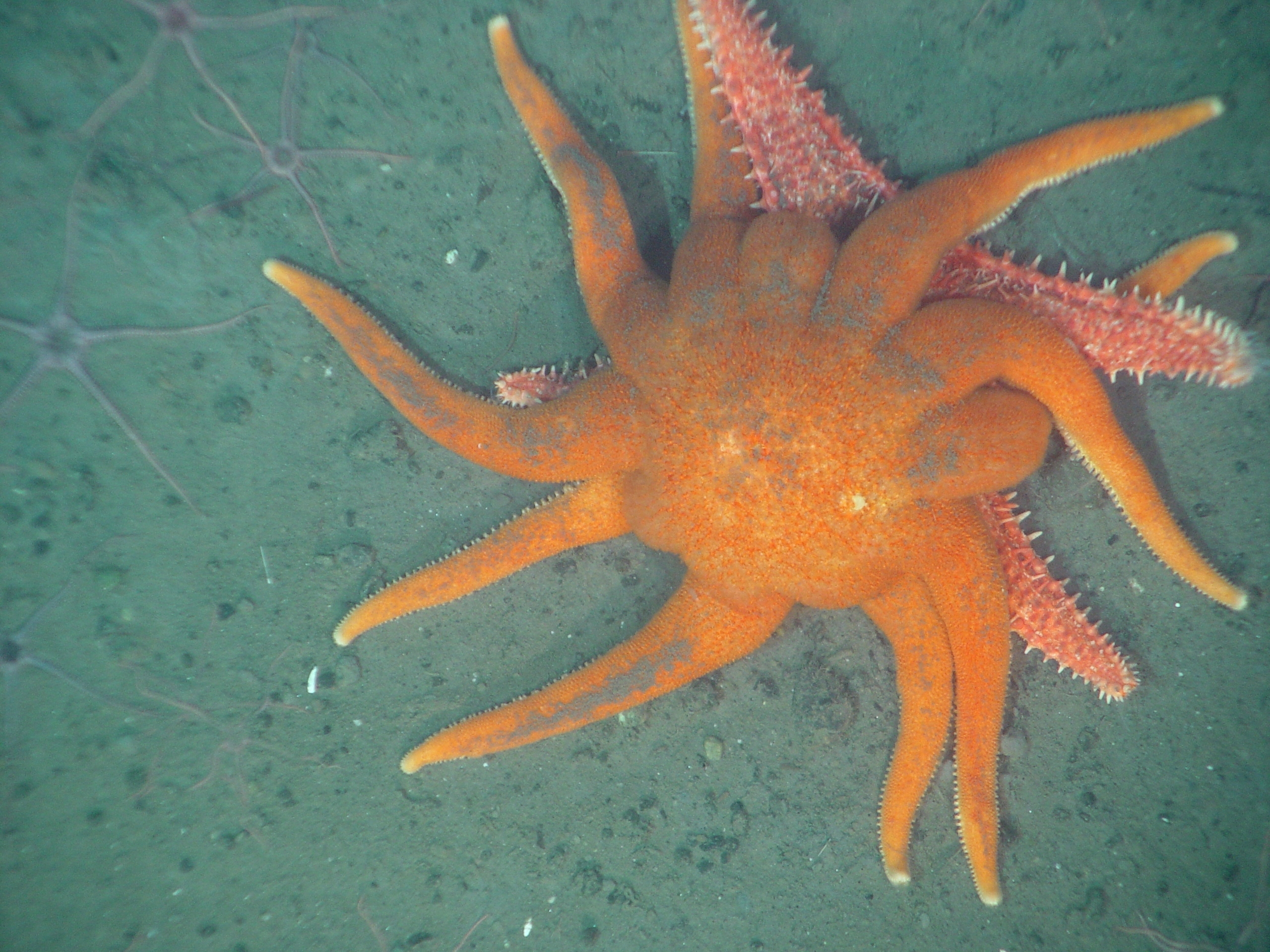
Hippasteria phrygiana attacked by Solaster dawsoni

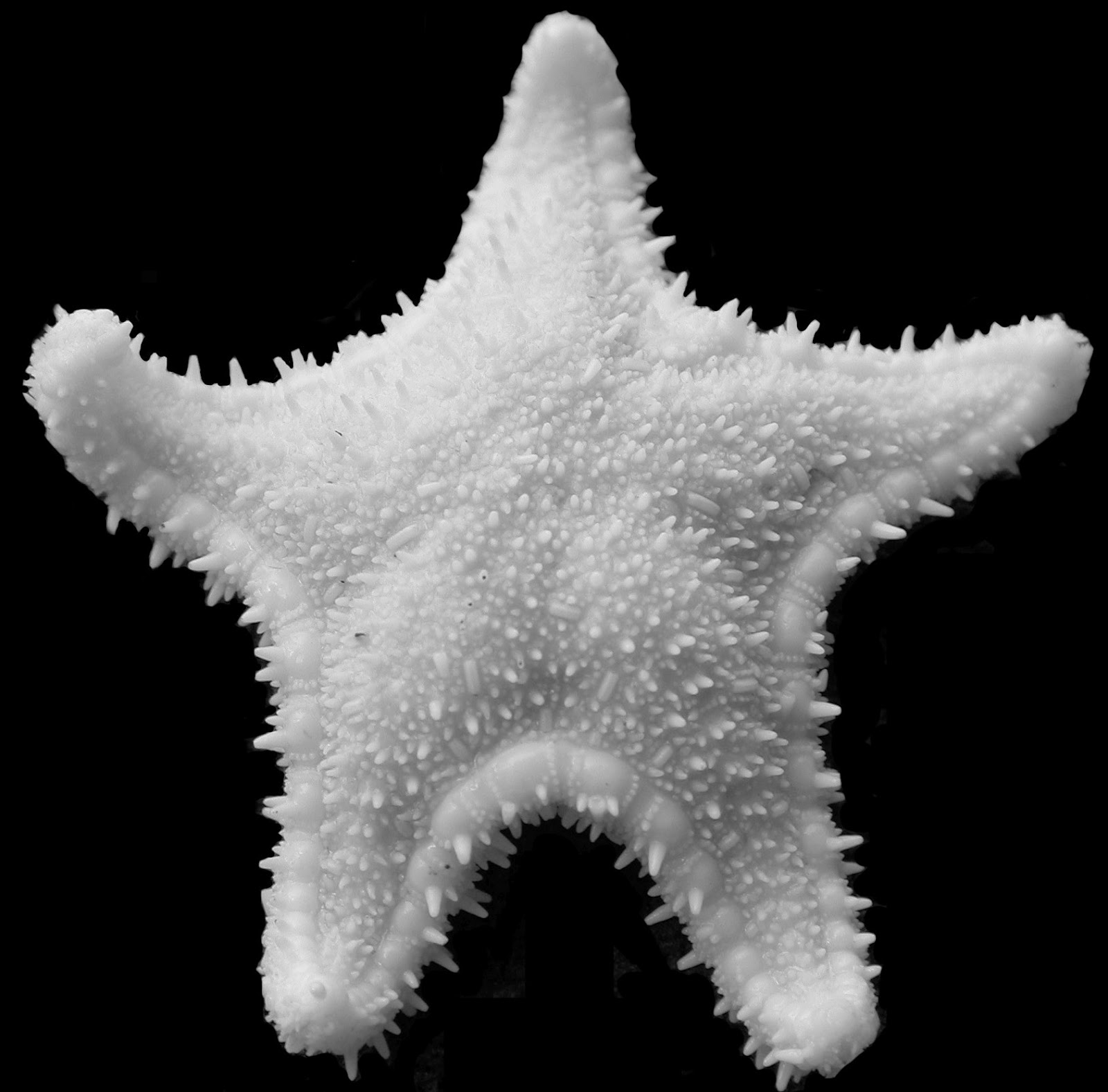
Hippasteria tiburoni

== Bibliography ==
- Mah, Christopher L.; Neill, K.; Eléaume, Marc; Foltz, D. (2014). "New Species and global revision of Hippasteria (Hippasterinae: Goniasteridae; Asteroidea; Echinodermata)". Zoological Journal of the Linnean Society. 171 (2): 422–456. doi:10.1111/zoj.12131.
