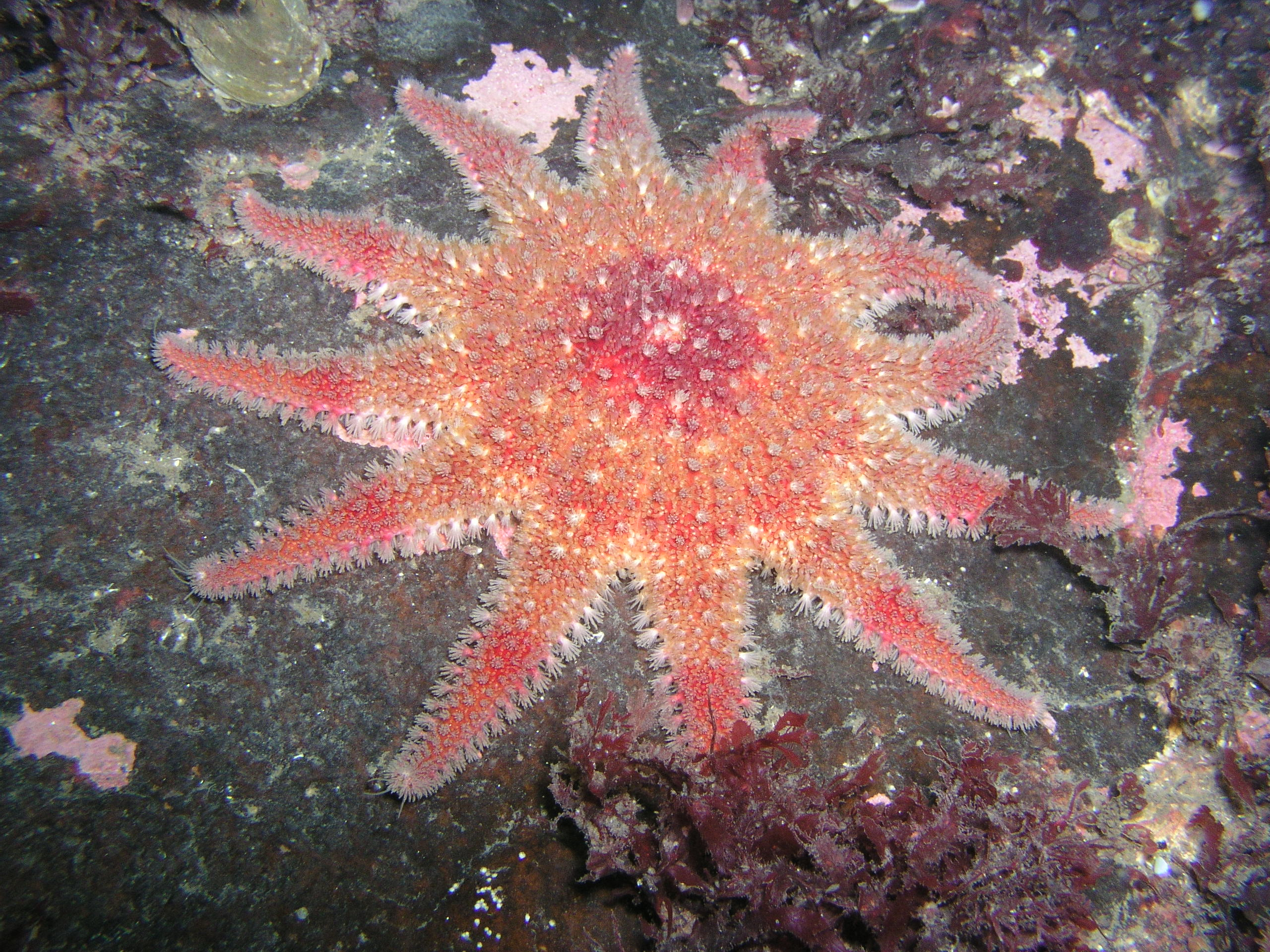
- Crossaster papposus

Scientific classification
- Kingdom: Animalia
- Phylum: Echinodermata
- Class: Asteroidea
- Order: Valvatida
- Family: Solasteridae
- Genus: Crossaster; Müller and Troschel, 1840

Species
- See text

= Crossaster =

Genus of starfishes

Crossaster is a genus of sea stars in the family Solasteridae.

== Species ==
The following species are listed in the World Register of Marine Species:

Image	Scientific name	Distribution
	Crossaster borealis Fisher, 1906	Pacific Coast of North America
	Crossaster campbellicus McKnight, 1973	
	Crossaster diamesus (Djakonov, 1932)	
	Crossaster helianthus Verrill, 1894	
	Crossaster japonicus (Fisher, 1911)	Okhotuk Sea, Japan Sea and North Pacific coast of Honsyu, Japan
	Crossaster multispinus H.L. Clark, 1916	
	Crossaster papposus (Linnaeus, 1767)	Atlantic and the Pacific Oceans.
	Crossaster penicillatus Sladen, 1889	
	Crossaster scotophilus (Fisher, 1913)	
	Crossaster squamatus (Döderlein, 1900)	Arctic Ocean
