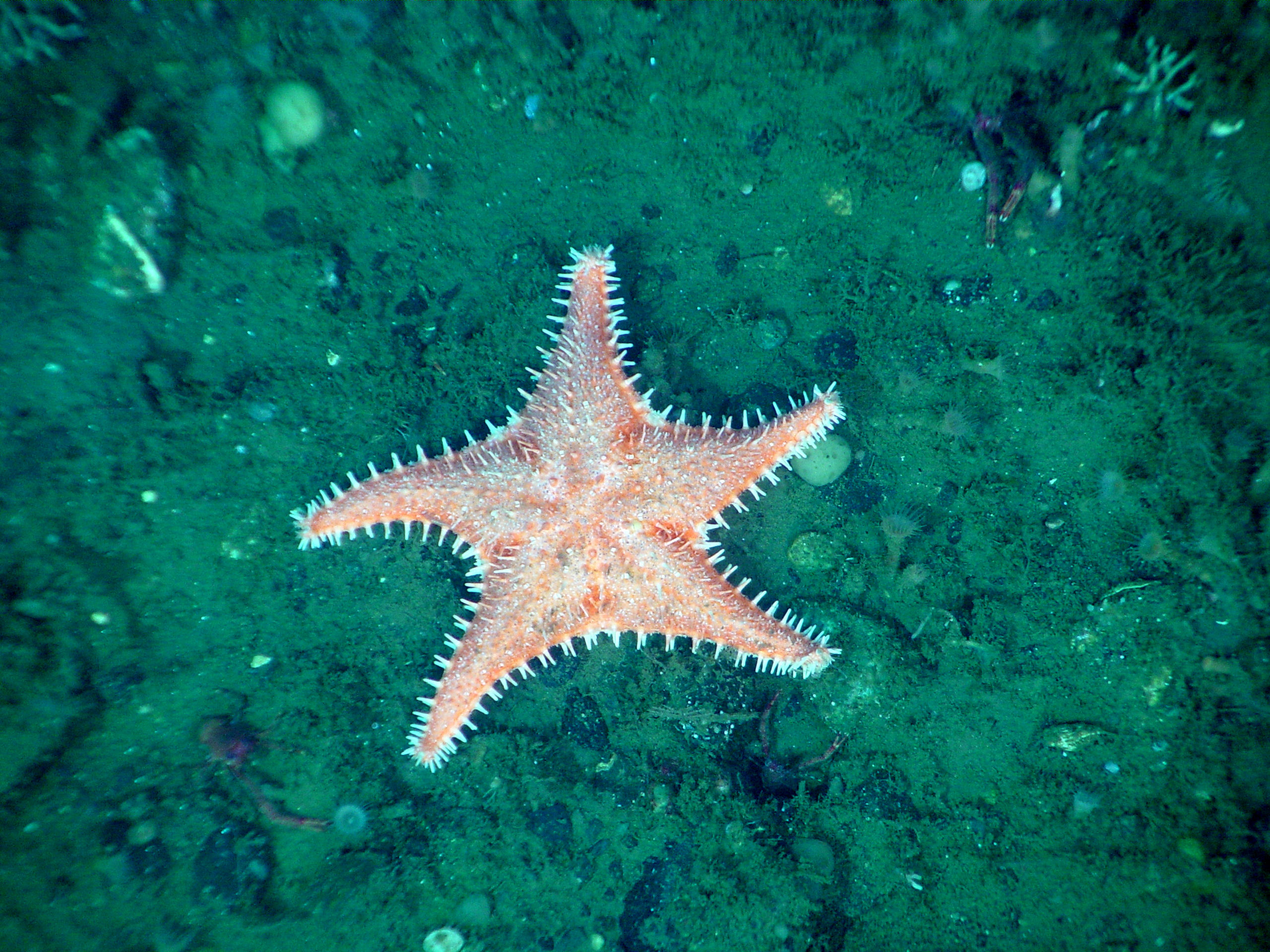

Scientific classification
- Kingdom: Animalia
- Phylum: Echinodermata
- Class: Asteroidea
- Order: Valvatida
- Family: Goniasteridae
- Genus: Hippasteria
- Species: H. phrygiana

Binomial name
- Hippasteria phrygiana (Parelius, 1768)

Synonyms
- Hippasteria spinosa Verrill, 1909

= Hippasteria phrygiana =

Trojan Star

Species of starfish

Hippasteria phrygiana, commonly known as the trojan star, is a sea star species, a member of the Goniasteridae family.

== Description and characteristics ==
This species grows up to 20 cm in diameter, with short arms and a large body. The upper surface is red and covered with rounded knob-like spines; the lower surface contains many macroscopic bivalved pedicellariae.

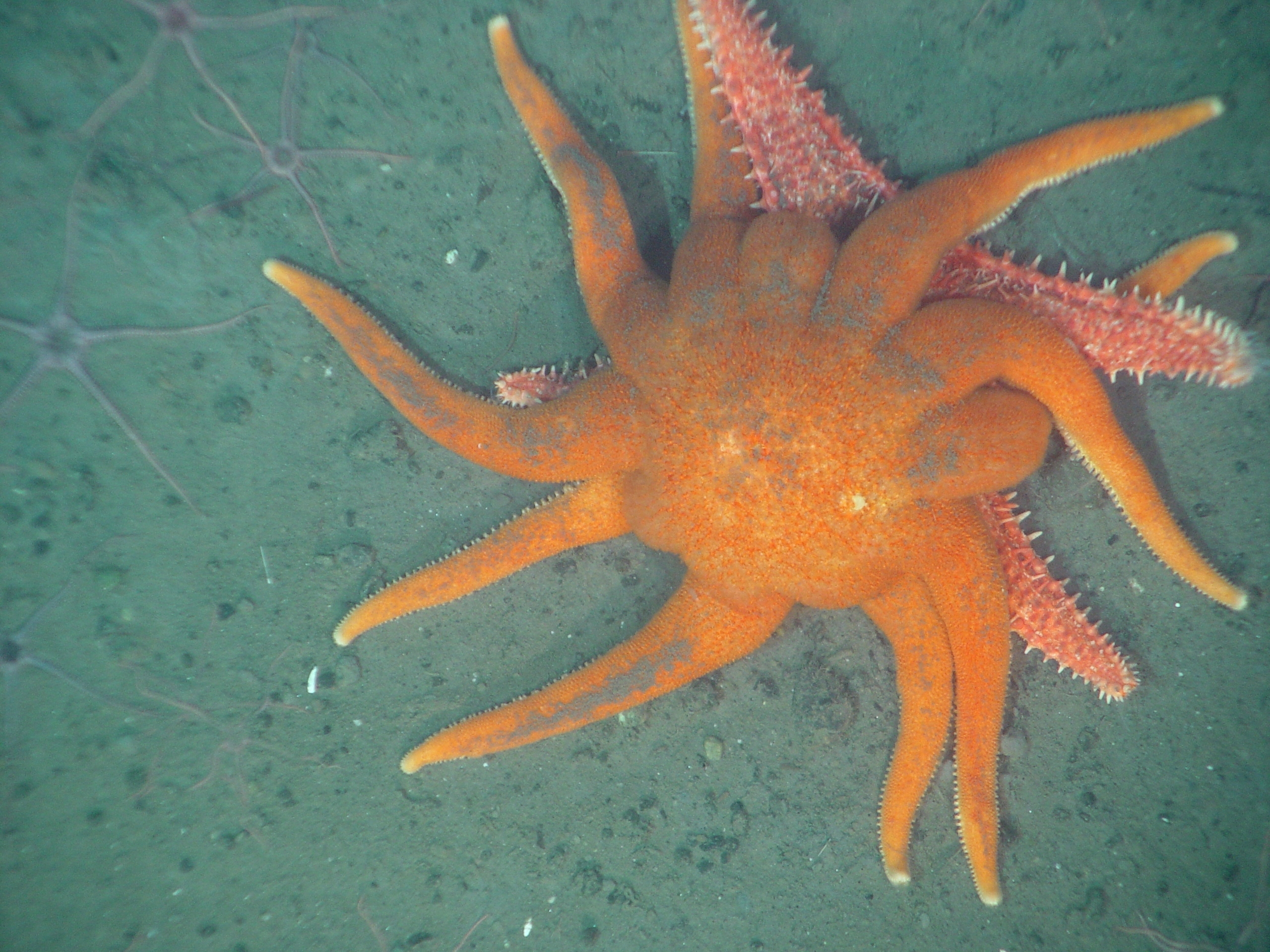
Hippasteria phrygiana attacked by Solaster dawsoni

== Habitat and geographic range ==
This species is incredibly widely distributed: it is present in the 3 main oceanic basins.

It lives mostly in cold and deep waters.

== Biology ==
This species feeds mostly on cnidarians, especially deep-sea corals.
