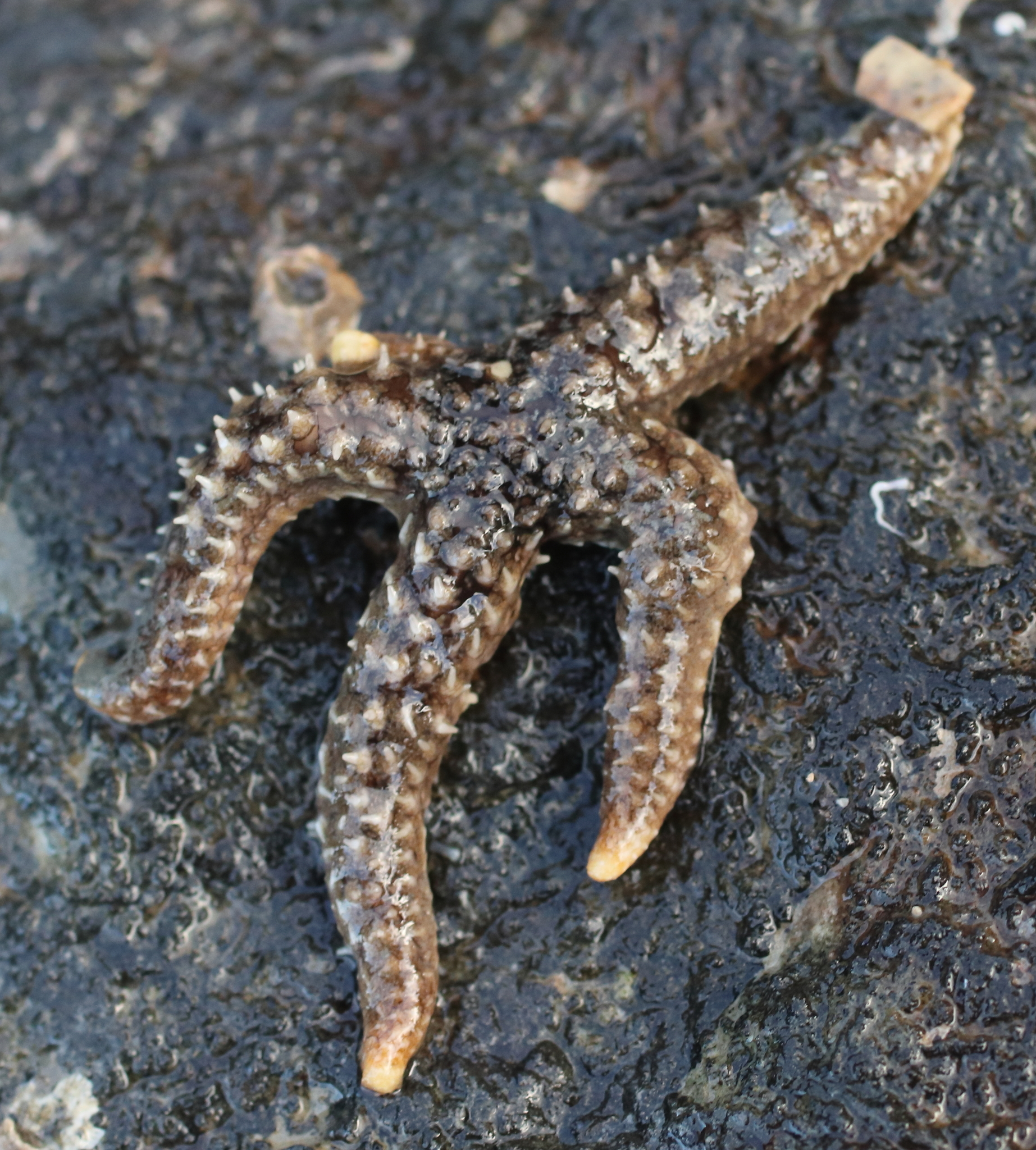

Scientific classification
- Kingdom: Animalia
- Phylum: Echinodermata
- Class: Asteroidea
- Order: Forcipulatida
- Family: Asteriidae
- Genus: Stylasterias; Verrill, 1914
- Species: S. forreri

Binomial name
- Stylasterias forreri (deLoriol, 1887)

Synonyms
- Asterias forcipulata Verrill, 1909; Asterias forreri de Loriol, 1887; Orthasterias forreri (de Loriol, 1888); Orthasterias leptolena Verrill, 1914

= Stylasterias =

Genus of starfishes

Stylasterias is a genus of starfish in the family Asteriidae. Stylasterias forreri, the velcro star, is the only species in the genus. It is found on the Pacific coast of Canada and the United States.

== Description ==
The velcro star is a large starfish, growing to a maximum diameter of 100 cm (39 in), but is usually considerably smaller. The central disc is small and the five (occasionally six) arms are long and tapering. Rows of large spines run down the arms, each one surrounded by a ring of 30-40 pedicellariae, tiny pincer-like structures. Between the spines are tufts of pale gills. This starfish gets its common name because the surface seems sticky to the touch. The stickiness is caused by the pedicellariae gripping the skin, and any attempt to push it off results in further pedicellariae becoming aroused. The colour of the velcro star is some shade of grey or black, or occasionally beige.

== Distribution ==
The velcro star occurs on the Pacific coast of North America, from Kodiak Island, Alaska, to Southern California. It is found at depths to about 530 m (1,740 ft). It is generally uncommon and mostly occurs in deep water at the head of fiords.

== Biology ==
The velcro star feeds on invertebrates such as gastropod molluscs and chitons. When alert to movement in the water nearby, the rings of pedicellariae are extended, ready for action. If anything touches its aboral (upper) surface, the starfish reacts by snapping shut the pedicellariae in the vicinity of the stimulus. By this means it can catch prey items such as small fish. The victim is passed to the mouth by movements of the arms and by actions of the tube feet. The velcro star can also defend itself against attack by predators such as the voracious morning sun star (Solaster dawsoni). To fight back, it coils its arms around the attacker and inflicts thousands of nips with its pedicellariae. The attacker often retreats and the velcro star escapes.
