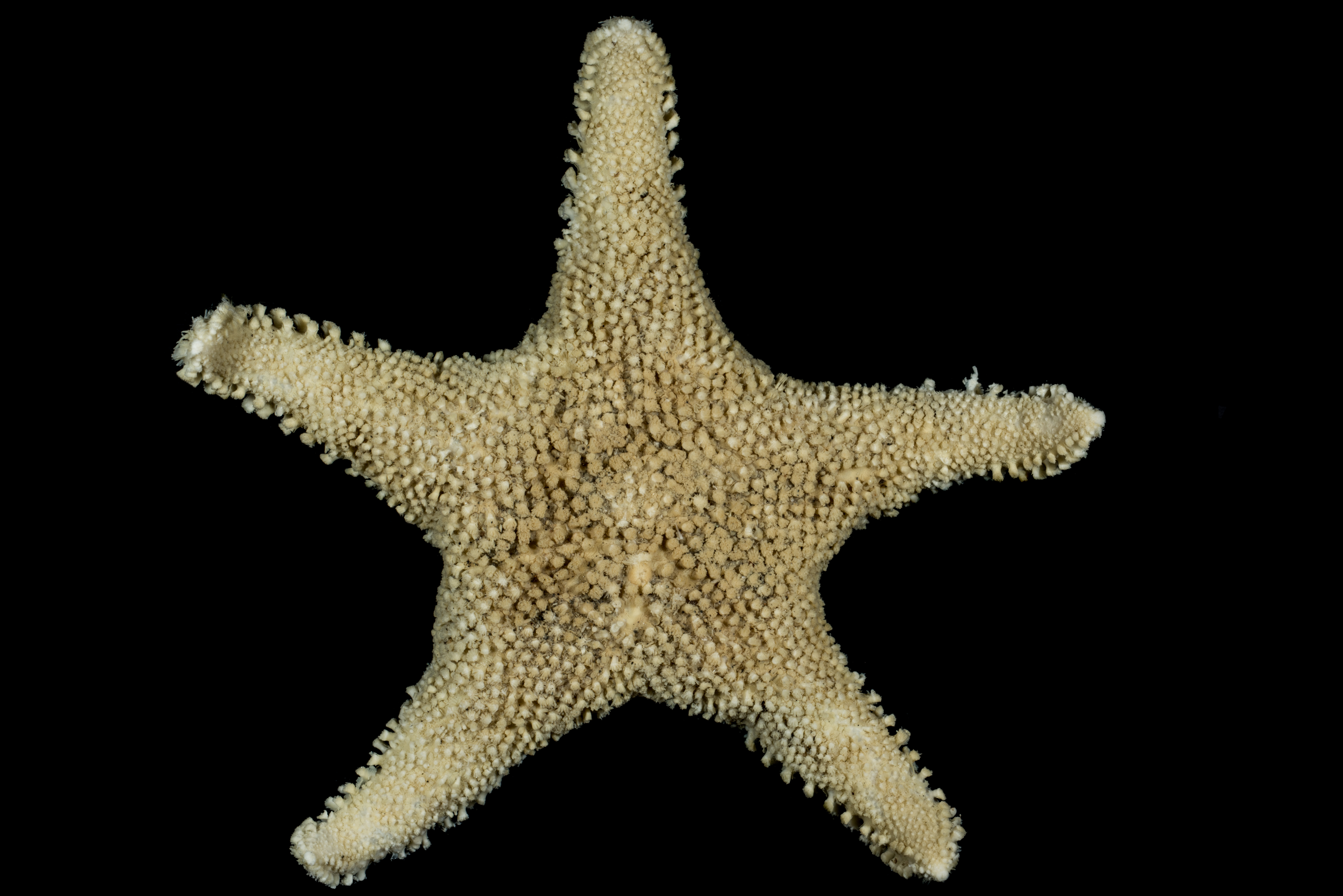
- Lophaster furcifer

Scientific classification
- Kingdom: Animalia
- Phylum: Echinodermata
- Class: Asteroidea
- Order: Valvatida
- Family: Solasteridae
- Genus: Lophaster; Verrill, 1878

Type species
- Solaster furcifer Düben & Koren, 1846

= Lophaster =

Genus of starfish

Lophaster is a genus of starfish within the family Solasteridae.

== Species ==
- Lophaster asiaticus Hayashi, 1973
- Lophaster cactorum Mah & Fujita, 2020
- Lophaster densus Fisher, 1940
- Lophaster furcifer (Düben & Koren, 1846)
- Lophaster furcilliger Fisher, 1905
- Lophaster gaini Koehler, 1912
- Lophaster quadrispinus H.L. Clark, 1923
- Lophaster stellans Sladen, 1889
- Lophaster suluensis Fisher, 1913
- Lophaster tenuis Koehler, 1920
- Lophaster verrilli A.H. Clark, 1938
