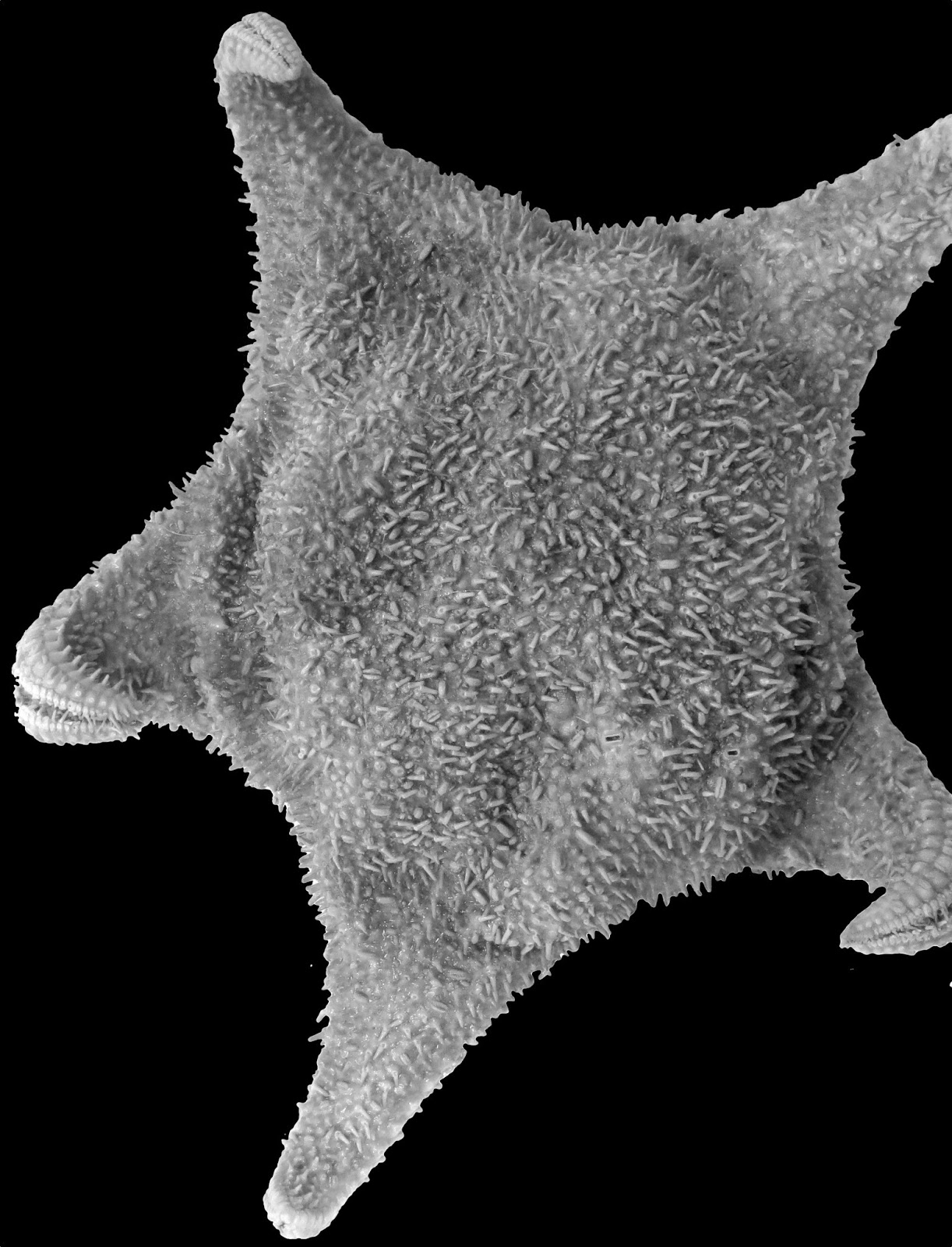
- Hippasteria muscipula holotype

Scientific classification
- Kingdom: Animalia
- Phylum: Echinodermata
- Class: Asteroidea
- Order: Valvatida
- Family: Goniasteridae
- Genus: Hippasteria
- Species: H. muscipula

Binomial name
- Hippasteria muscipula Mah, Neill, Eleaume & Foltz 2014

= Hippasteria muscipula =

Species of starfish

Hippasteria muscipula is one of twelve species of deep-sea sea star in the genus Hippasteria, which is in the family Goniasteridae.

== Description and characteristics ==
It is a regular, five-armed sea star, with a large and flattened central disc (as most species in this family). The body is covered by short and stout spines, and characterized by big, fly-trap like pedicellariae. When alive, the central disc is swollen, forming five radial bumps. It is a rather big species, and can grow up to 30 cm across.

This species seems to be a predator of deep sea coral and other cnidarians, and was observed climbing on corals in order to feed.

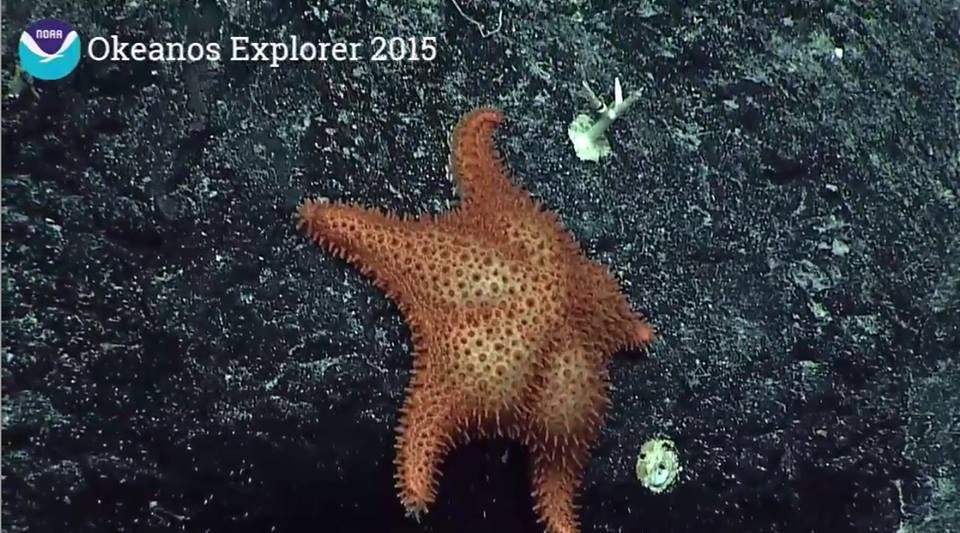
Hippasteria muscipula observed in the deep sea off Hawaii

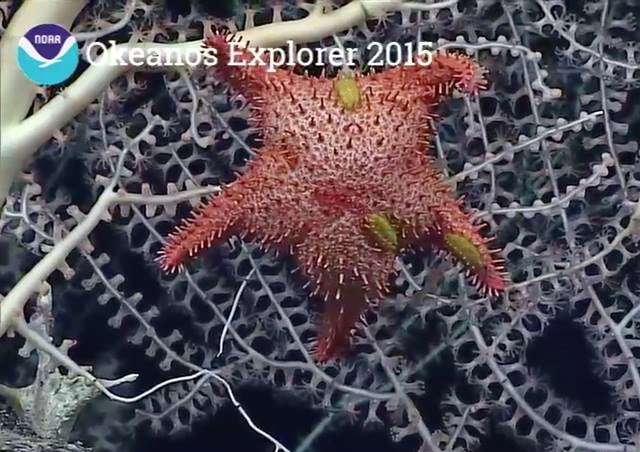
Hippasteria muscipula climbing on coral, probably feeding (with yellow polychaete worms).

This species remained unknown to science until 2014, but since its description it was observed many times in its environment by deep-sea research missions, such as Okeanos Explorer 2015, off Hawaii.

Its name comes from its impressive pedicellariae, which look like traps of the carnivorous plant called "Venus fly trap" (Dionaea muscipula).

== Habitat and repartition ==
This species lives in the depths of Pacific Ocean, and has been recorded in Hawaii, New Caledonia and New Zealand, between 425 and 1500 meters deep.

== Bibliography ==
- Mah, Christopher L.; Neill, K.; Eléaume, Marc; Foltz, D. (2014). "New Species and global revision of Hippasteria (Hippasterinae: Goniasteridae; Asteroidea; Echinodermata)". Zoological Journal of the Linnean Society. 171 (2): 422–456. doi:10.1111/zoj.12131.
