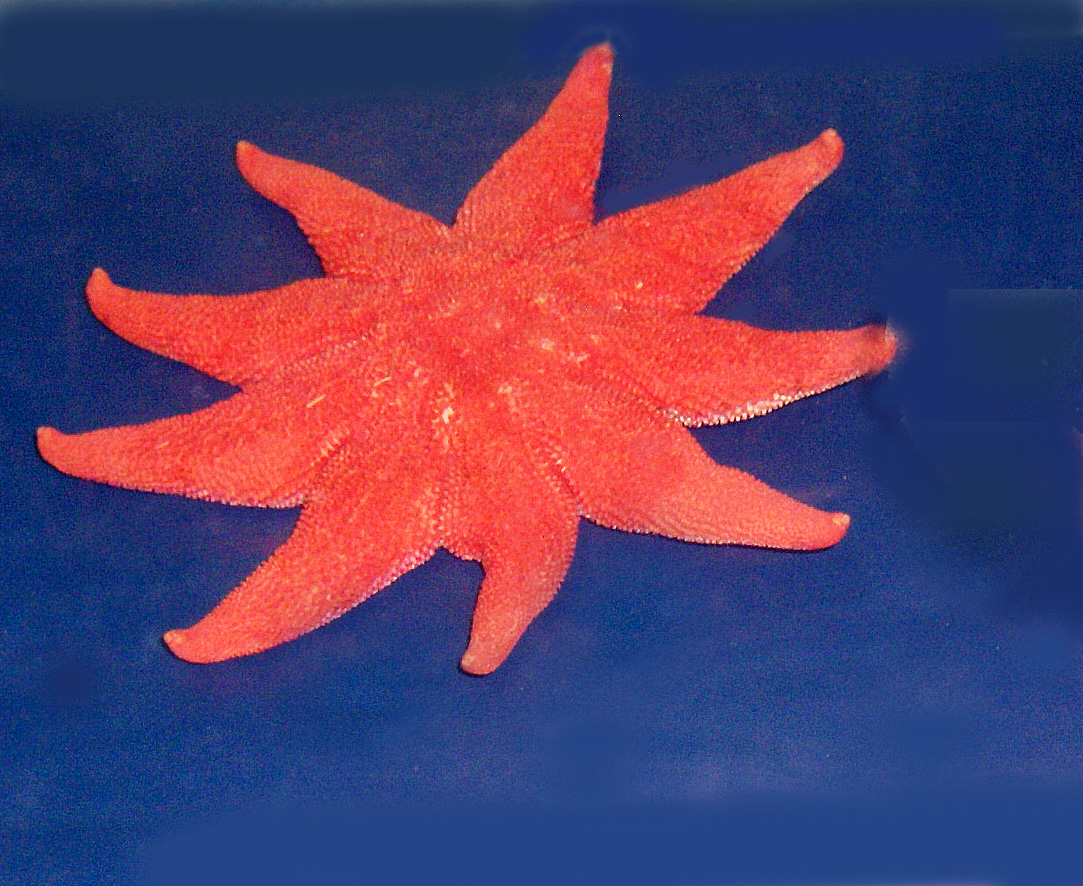
- Solaster endeca

Scientific classification
- Kingdom: Animalia
- Phylum: Echinodermata
- Class: Asteroidea
- Order: Valvatida
- Family: Solasteridae
- Genus: Solaster; Forbes, 1839

Species
- See text

= Solaster =

Genus of starfishes

Solaster is a genus of sea stars in the family Solasteridae.

== Species ==
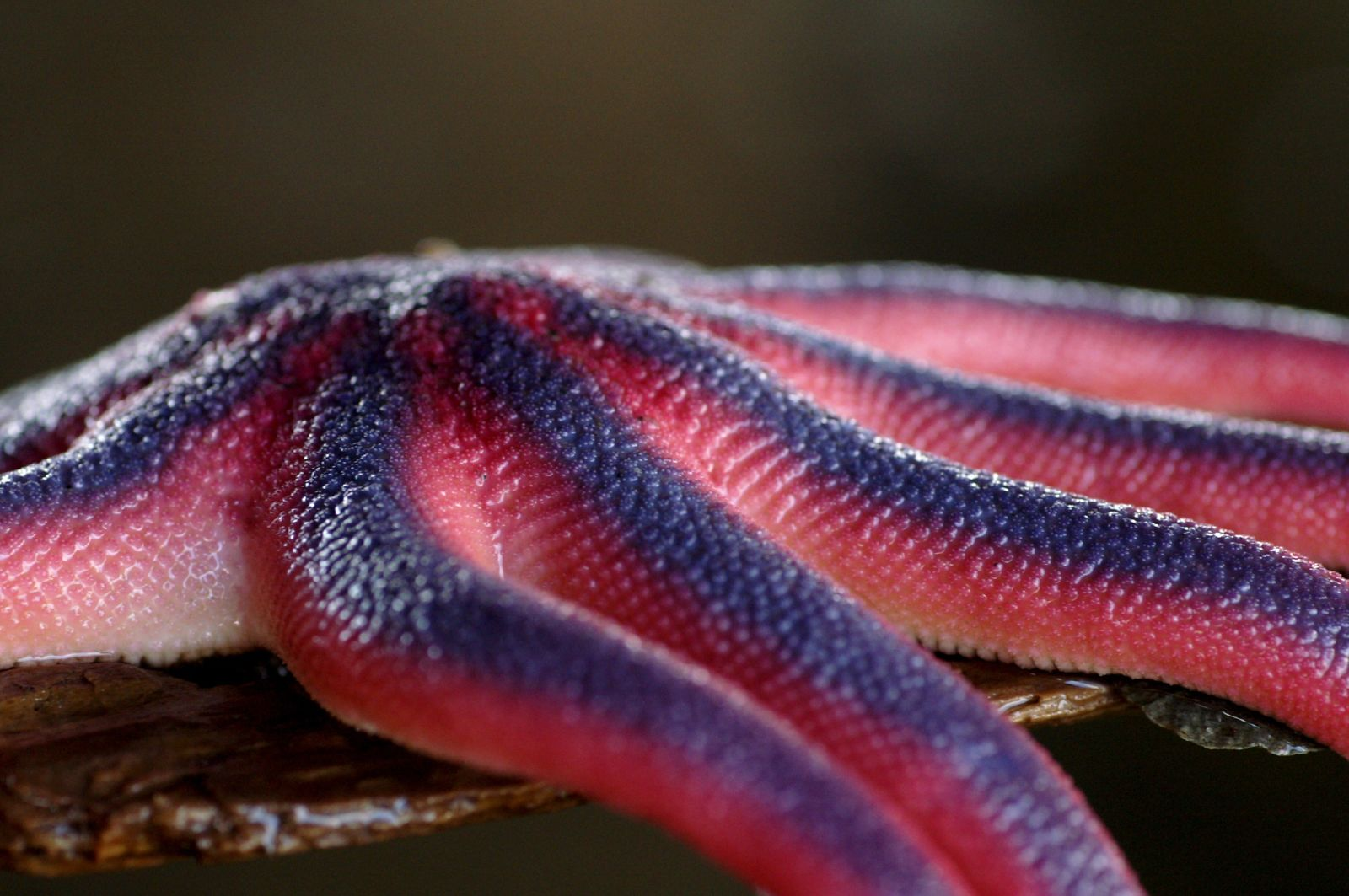
Solaster stimpsoni

The following species are listed in the World Register of Marine Species:

- Solaster abyssicola Verrill, 1885
- Solaster benedicti Verrill, 1894
- Solaster caribbaeus Verrill, 1915
- Solaster dawsoni Verrill, 1880
  - S. d. arcticus Verrill, 1914
  - S. d. dawsoni Verrill, 1880
- Solaster earlli Verrill, 1879
- Solaster endeca (Linnaeus, 1771)
- Solaster exiguus Fisher, 1910
- Solaster glacialis Danielssen & Koren, 1881
- Solaster haliplous Djakonov, 1958
- Solaster hexactis Clark & Jewett, 2011
- Solaster hypothrissus Fisher, 1910
- Solaster intermedius Hayashi, 1939
- Solaster longoi Stampanato & Jangoux, 1993
- Solaster namakae Mah, 2022
- Solaster notophrynus Downey, 1971
- Solaster pacificus Djakonov, 1938
- Solaster paxillatus Sladen, 1889
  - S. p. celebesensis Aziz & Jangoux, 1985
- Solaster regularis Sladen, 1889
  - S. r. regularis Sladen, 1889
  - S. r. subarcuatus Sladen, 1889
- Solaster spectabilis Clark and Jewett, 2011
- Solaster stimpsoni Verrill, 1880
- Solaster syrtensis Verrill, 1894
- Solaster torulatus Sladen, 1889
- Solaster tropicus Fisher, 1913
- Solaster uchidai Hayashi, 1939
