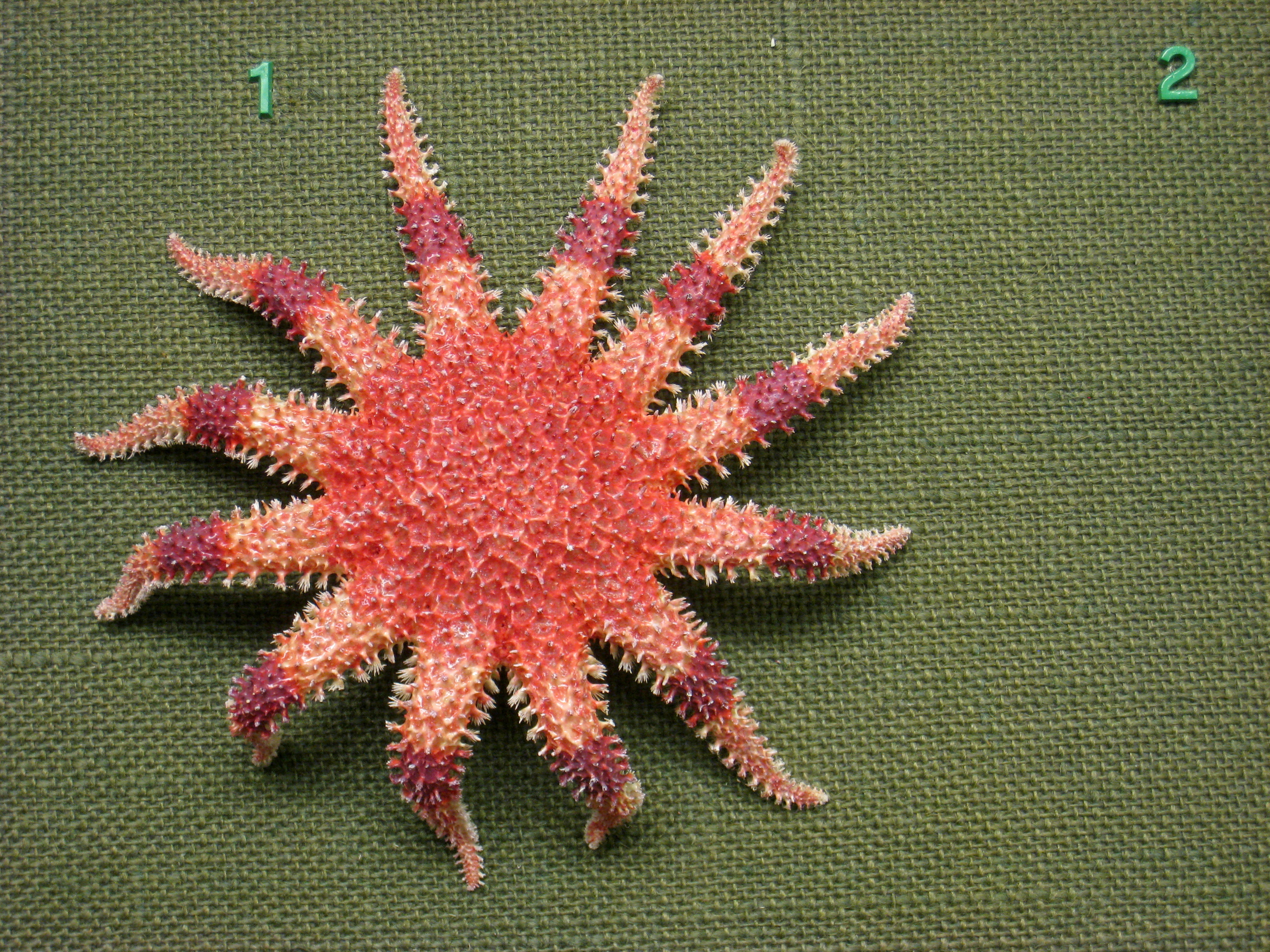

Scientific classification
- Kingdom: Animalia
- Phylum: Echinodermata
- Class: Asteroidea
- Order: Valvatida
- Family: Solasteridae
- Genus: Crossaster
- Species: C. papposus

Binomial name
- Crossaster papposus Linnaeus, 1776

Synonyms
- Asterias affinis Brandt, 1835; Asterias helianthemoides Pennant, 1777; Asterias papposus Linnaeus, 1776; Crossaster aboverrucosus (Brandt, 1835); Crossaster affinis Danielssen & Koren, 1876; Crossaster affinis (Brandt, 1835); Crossaster koreni Verrill, 1914; Crossaster neptuni Bell, 1881; Solaster affinis Danielssen & Koren, 1877; Solaster papposus Müller & Troschel, 1842; Stellonia papposa L. Agassiz, 1836

= Common sunstar =

Species of starfish

The common sunstar (Crossaster papposus) is a species of sea star (aka starfish) belonging to the family Solasteridae. It is found in the northern parts of both the Atlantic and the Pacific Oceans.

== Distribution ==
The common sunstar is distributed from the Arctic down to the English Channel, in the North Sea, also on both East (from the Arctic to the Gulf of Maine) and Pacific coasts (from Alaska to Puget Sound) of North America. It is also circumboreal, found in Greenland, Iceland, the Barents Sea, Kola Bay, Okhotsk Sea and the White Sea.

== Habitat ==
The common sunstar is commonly found on rocky bottoms, coarse sand and gravel in the bathyal, infralittoral and circalittoral zone (from low-tide line up to depths of 300 m). It seems to prefer areas of high water movement. Very small sunstars are sometimes found in rock pools.

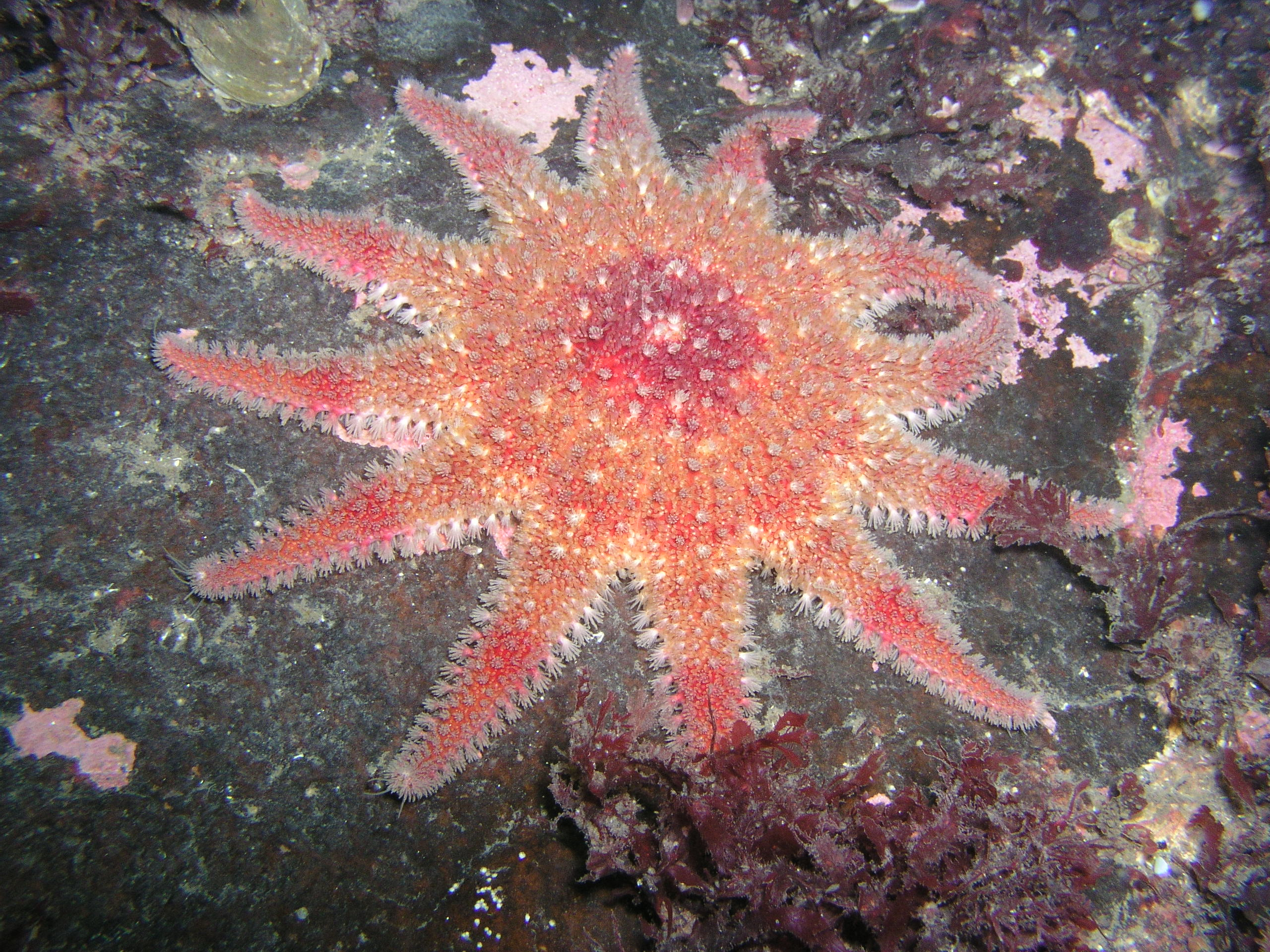
Common sunstar

== Description ==
It is reddish on top with concentric bands of white, pink, yellow, or dark red, and it is white on the underside. It is covered on top with brushlike spines, with the marginal spines somewhat larger. The thick, central disc is fairly large. This central disc has a netlike pattern of raised ridges. The mouth area is bare. It has relatively short arms which usually number eight to fourteen. Its radius can be up to 15 cm (6 inches). The madreporite plate stands out clearly.

== Food ==
The common sunstar is an omnivore. It will eat almost anything, including smaller starfish and sunstars, swallowing them whole. It is also a scavenger.
