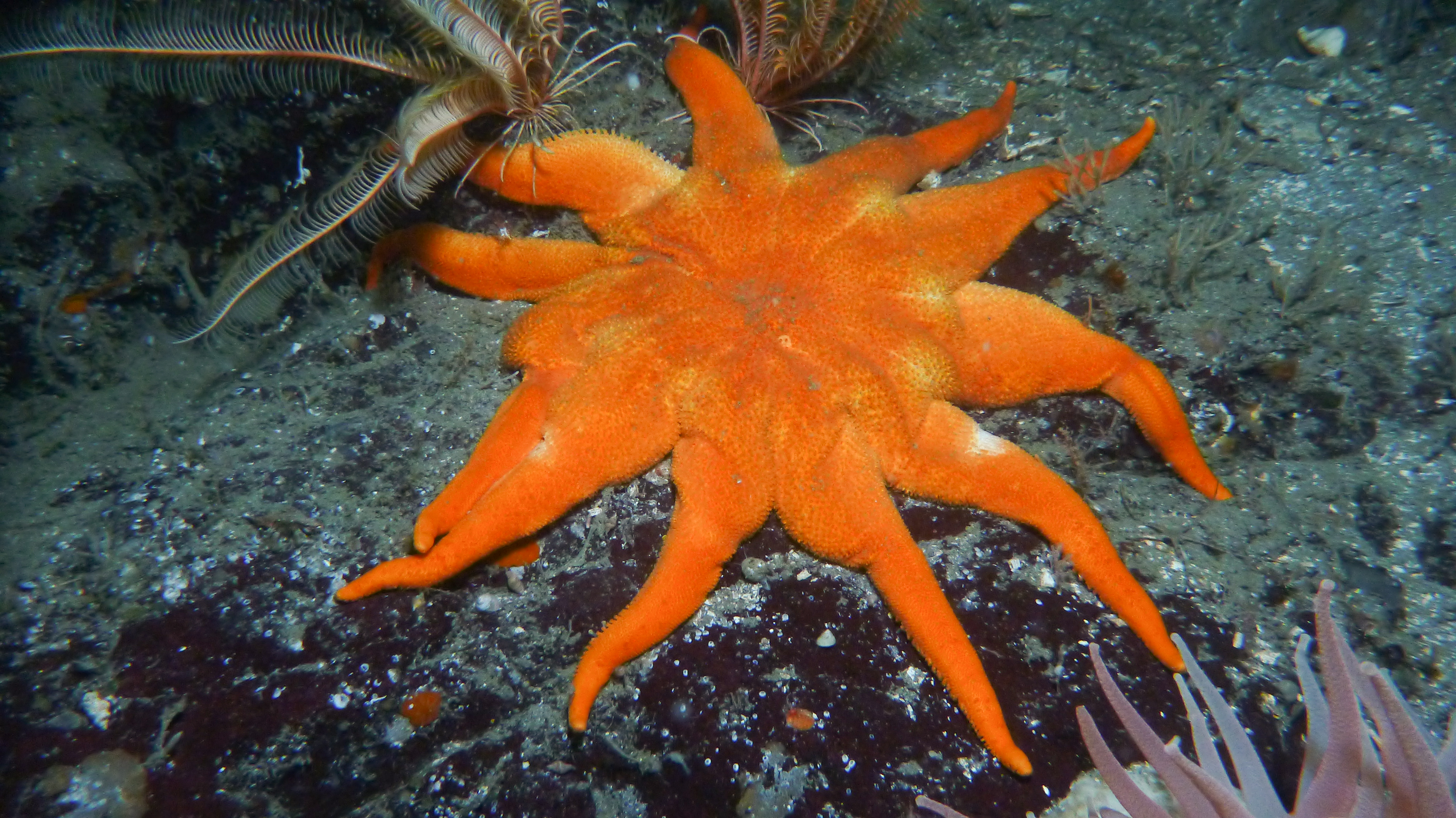
- Solaster dawsoni off Vancouver.

Scientific classification
- Domain: Eukaryota
- Kingdom: Animalia
- Phylum: Echinodermata
- Class: Asteroidea
- Order: Valvatida
- Family: Solasteridae
- Genus: Solaster
- Species: S. dawsoni

Binomial name
- Solaster dawsoni Verrill, 1880

= Solaster dawsoni =

Species of starfish

Solaster dawsoni, the morning sun star, is a species of starfish in the family Solasteridae. It is found on either side of the northern Pacific Ocean. It has two subspecies:

- Solaster dawsoni arcticus Verrill, 1914
- Solaster dawsoni dawsoni Verrill, 1880

== Description ==
The morning sun star has a wide disc and 8 to 13 (usually 11 or 12) long, tapering arms, often with turned-up tips. The upper or aboral surface is smooth, and its colour is usually red, orange, grey, or pale brown, sometimes with paler patches. It grows to a width of about 40 cm (16 in).

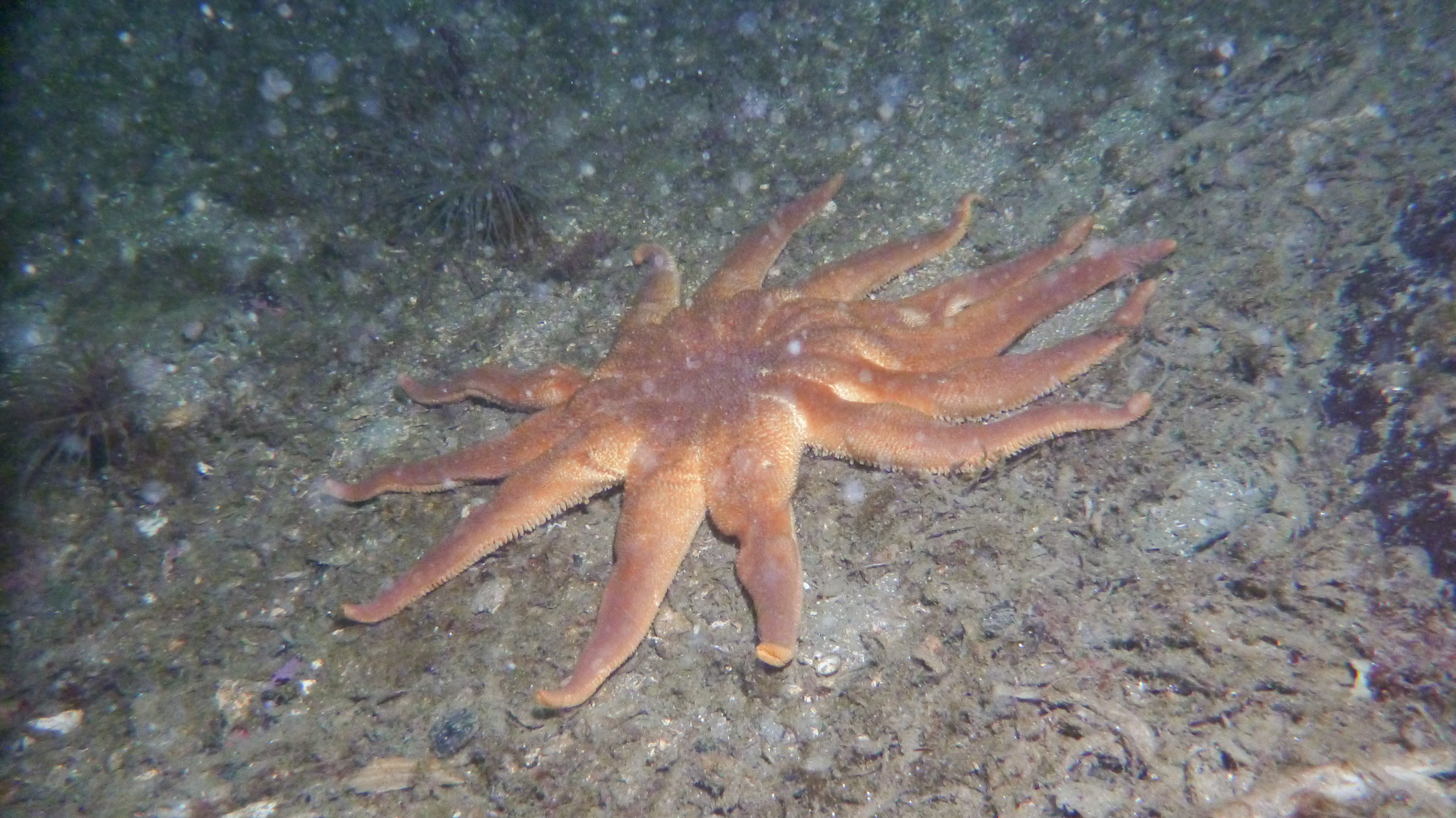

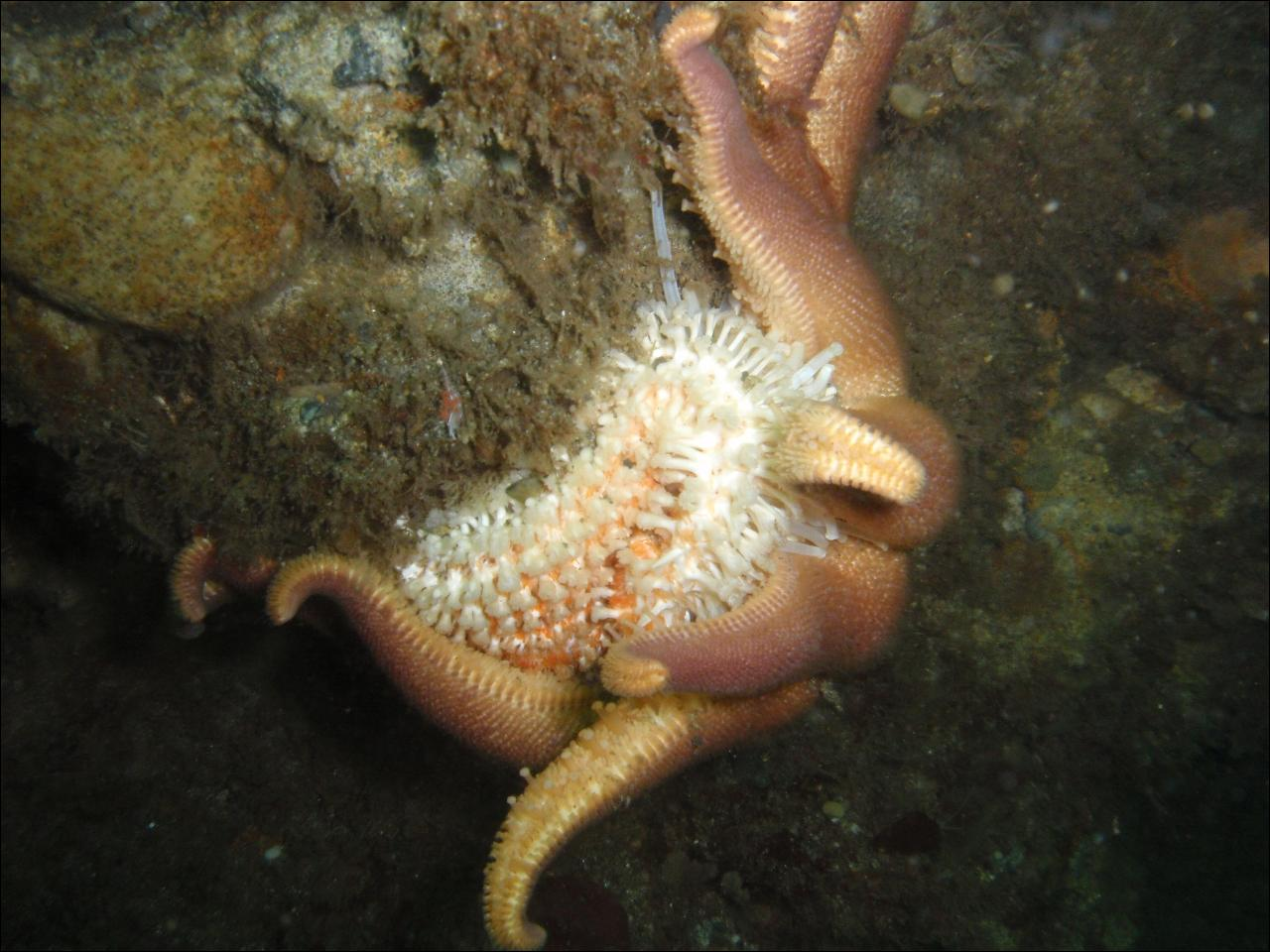
Eating.

== Distribution ==
The morning sun star occurs in the northern Pacific Ocean at depths to about 420 m (1,380 ft). Its range extends from Japan, China, and Siberia to the coasts of North America as far south as California. It is often found in rocky habitats, but can also inhabit other types of seabed.

== Behaviour ==
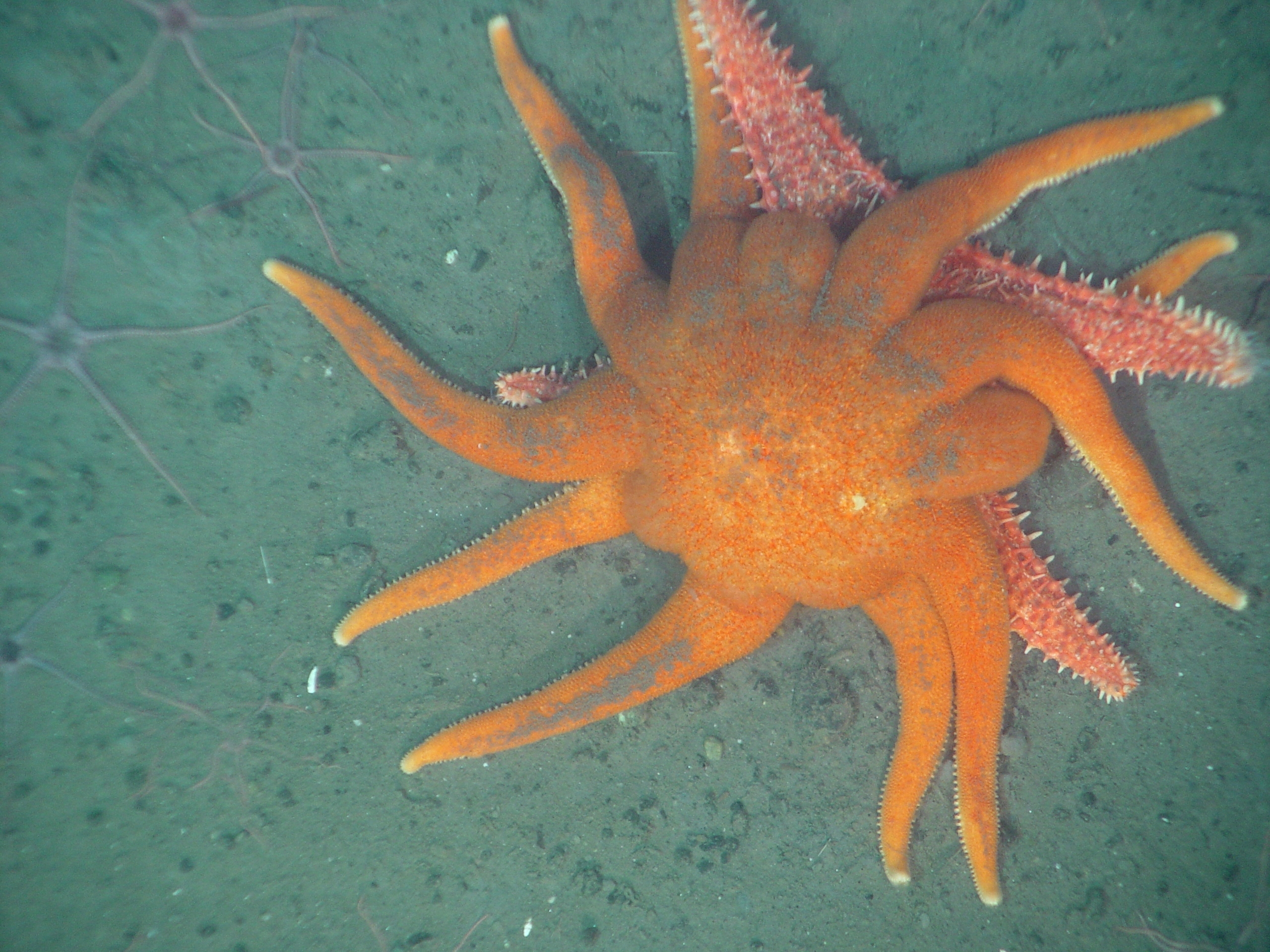
Solaster dawsoni attacking a spiny red sea star, Hippasteria spinosa

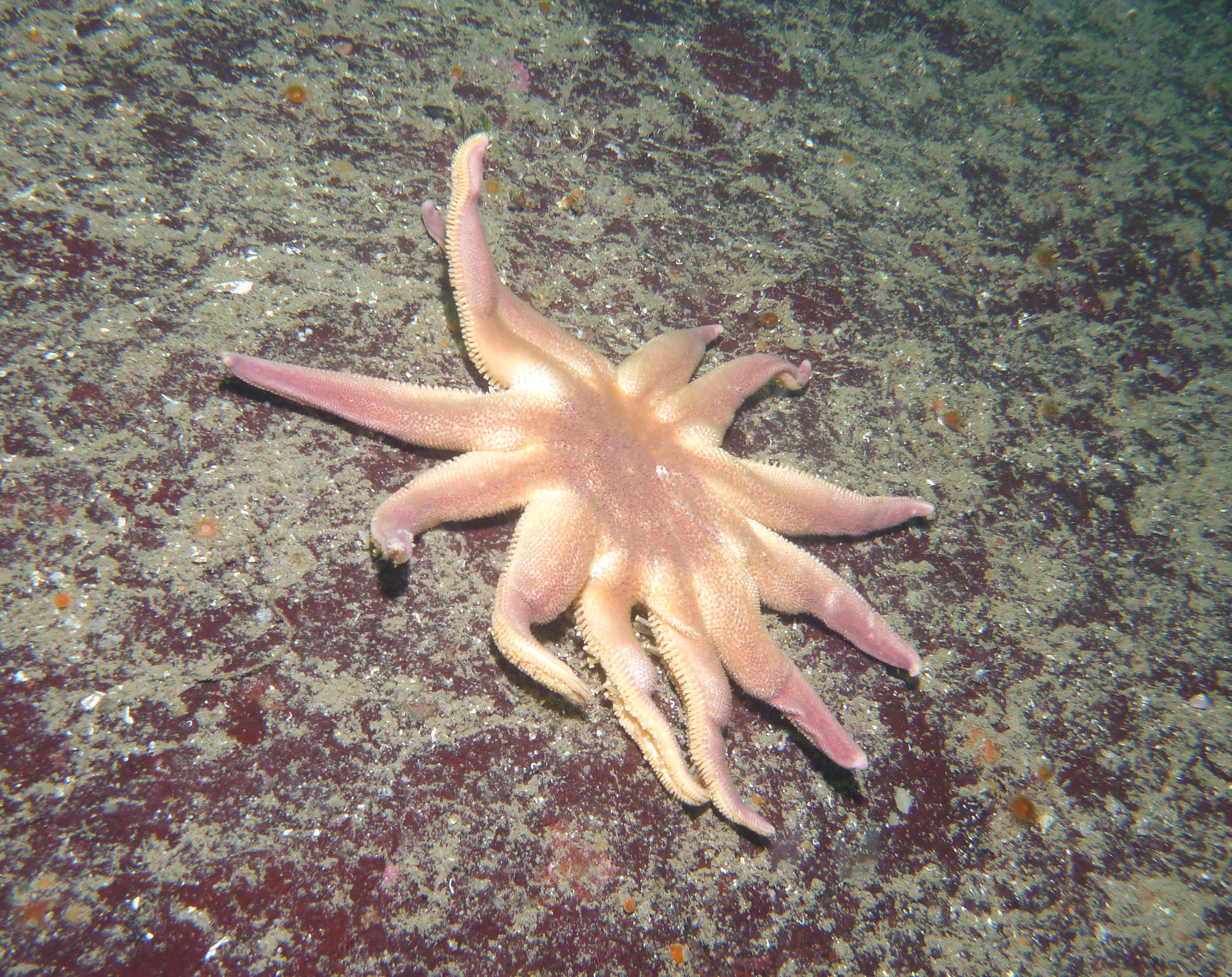
An adult specimen of Solaster dawsoni afflicted by the Sea star wasting disease off Vancouver.

The morning sun star is a predator, feeding mostly on other starfish. It is feared by other stars which move away as fast as they can if touched by a morning sun star. In British Columbia, about half of its diet consists of leather stars (Dermasterias imbricata), which move too slowly to evade it. Other sea stars such as the velcro star (Stylasterias forreri) and the rainbow star (Orthasterias koehleri) fight back at their attacker. They have numerous tiny pincer-like organs called pedicellariae and coil their arms around the morning sun star, nipping it with these. It recoils and its prey often manages to escape. Another sometimes successful defence strategy is used by the slime star (Pteraster tesselatus) which inflates its aboral surface making it difficult for the attacker to get a grip on it and at the same time exudes copious amounts of noxious mucus. Even the often larger sunflower seastar (Pycnopodia helianthoides) retreats when touched by a morning sun star. If grabbed, the sunflower star may leave one of its arms behind, a process called autotomy, sacrificing this limb to make its escape. The morning sun is also a cannibal, feeding on other individuals of its own species, and also feeds on sea cucumbers and diamondback nudibranchs.

The morning sun star breeds between March and June. The gonads release eggs and sperm which rise to the surface where the eggs are fertilised. They have large yolks and the developing larvae rely on this and do not feed. They can swim and they drift with the currents as part of the zooplankton. They later sink to the seabed and undergo metamorphosis into juvenile starfish.

This species has been subject to the Sea star wasting disease since 2013.
