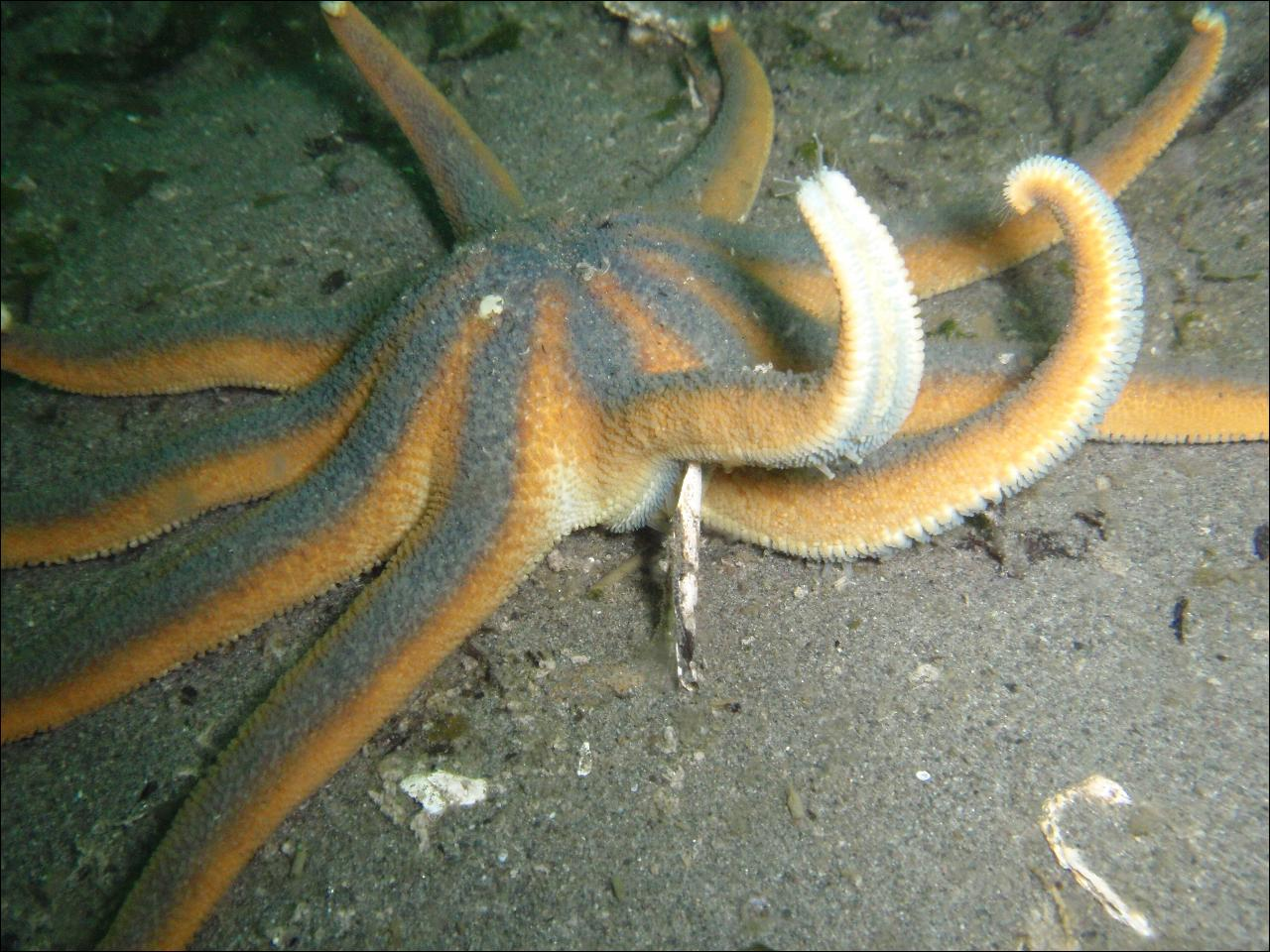
- Solaster stimpsoni

Scientific classification
- Kingdom: Animalia
- Phylum: Echinodermata
- Class: Asteroidea
- Order: Valvatida
- Family: Solasteridae; Viguier, 1878

Genera
- See text

= Solasteridae =

Family of starfishes

The Solasteridae are a family of sea stars.

== Genera ==
The following genera are listed in the World Register of Marine Species:

- Crossaster Müller and Troschel, 1840
- Heterozonias Fisher, 1910
- Laetmaster Fisher, 1908
- Lophaster Verrill, 1878
- Paralophaster Fisher, 1940
- Rhipidaster Sladen, 1889
- Seriaster Jangoux, 1984
- Solaster Forbes, 1839
- Xenorias Fisher, 1913
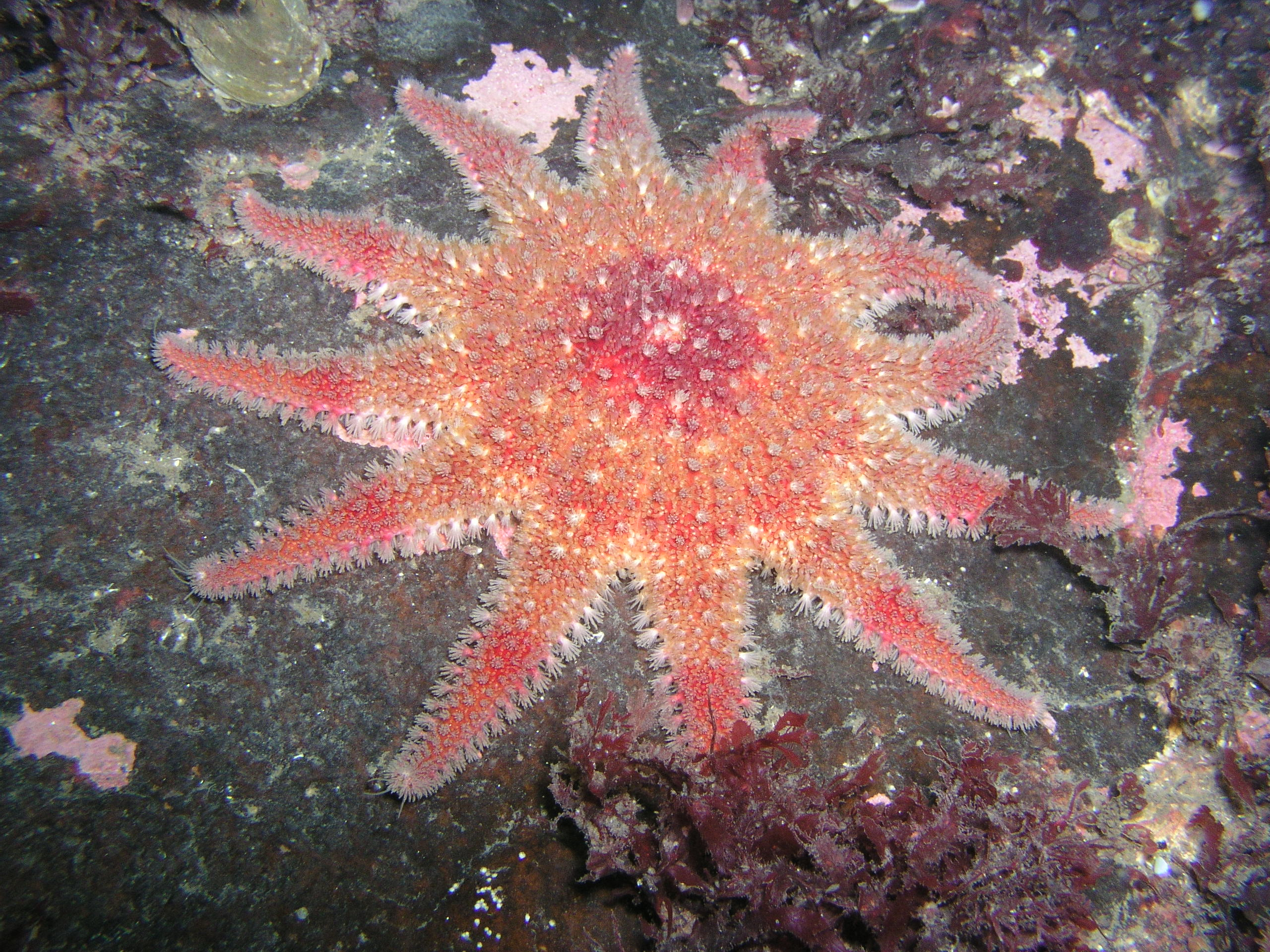
Crossaster papposus

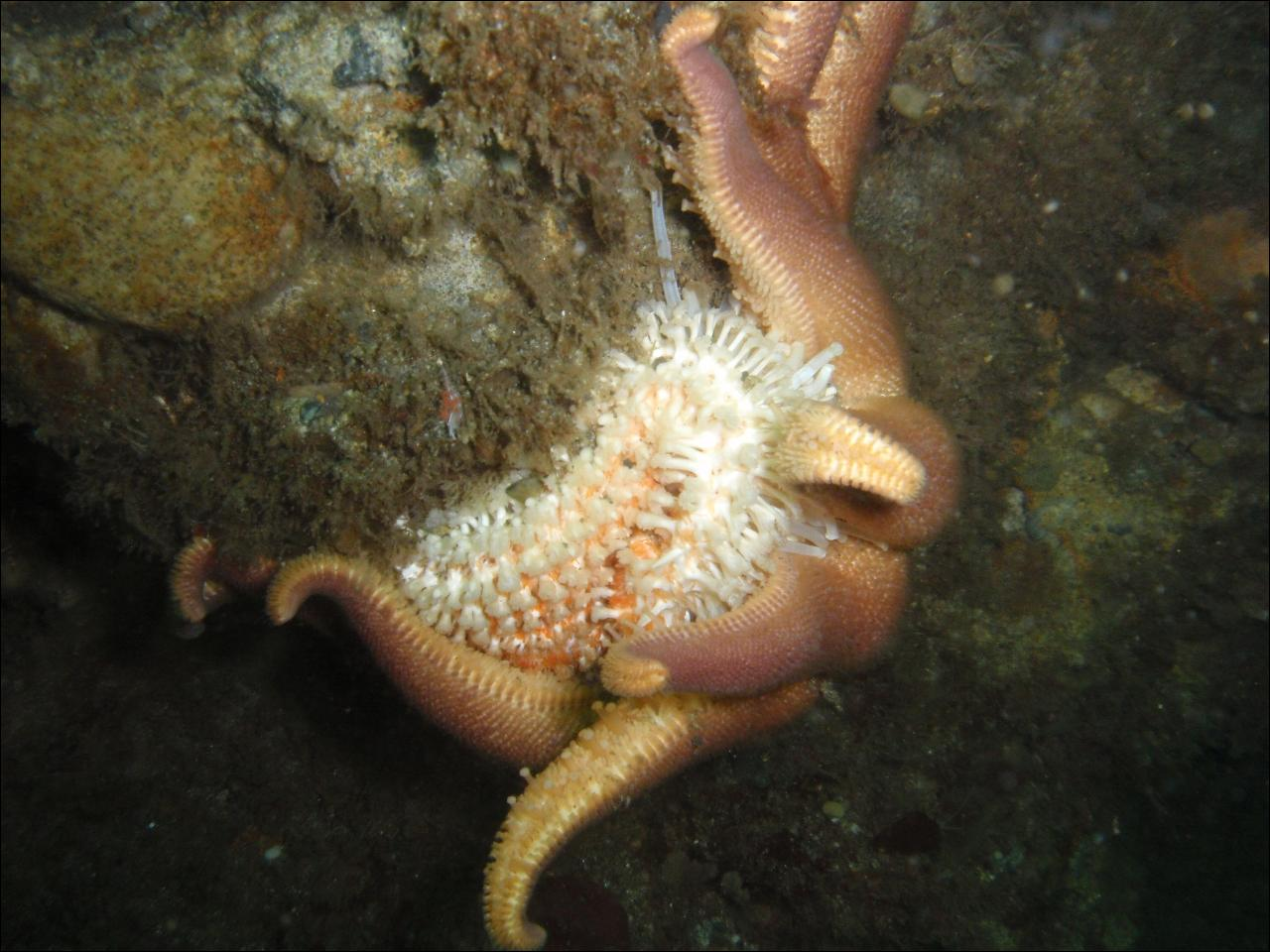
Solaster dawsoni

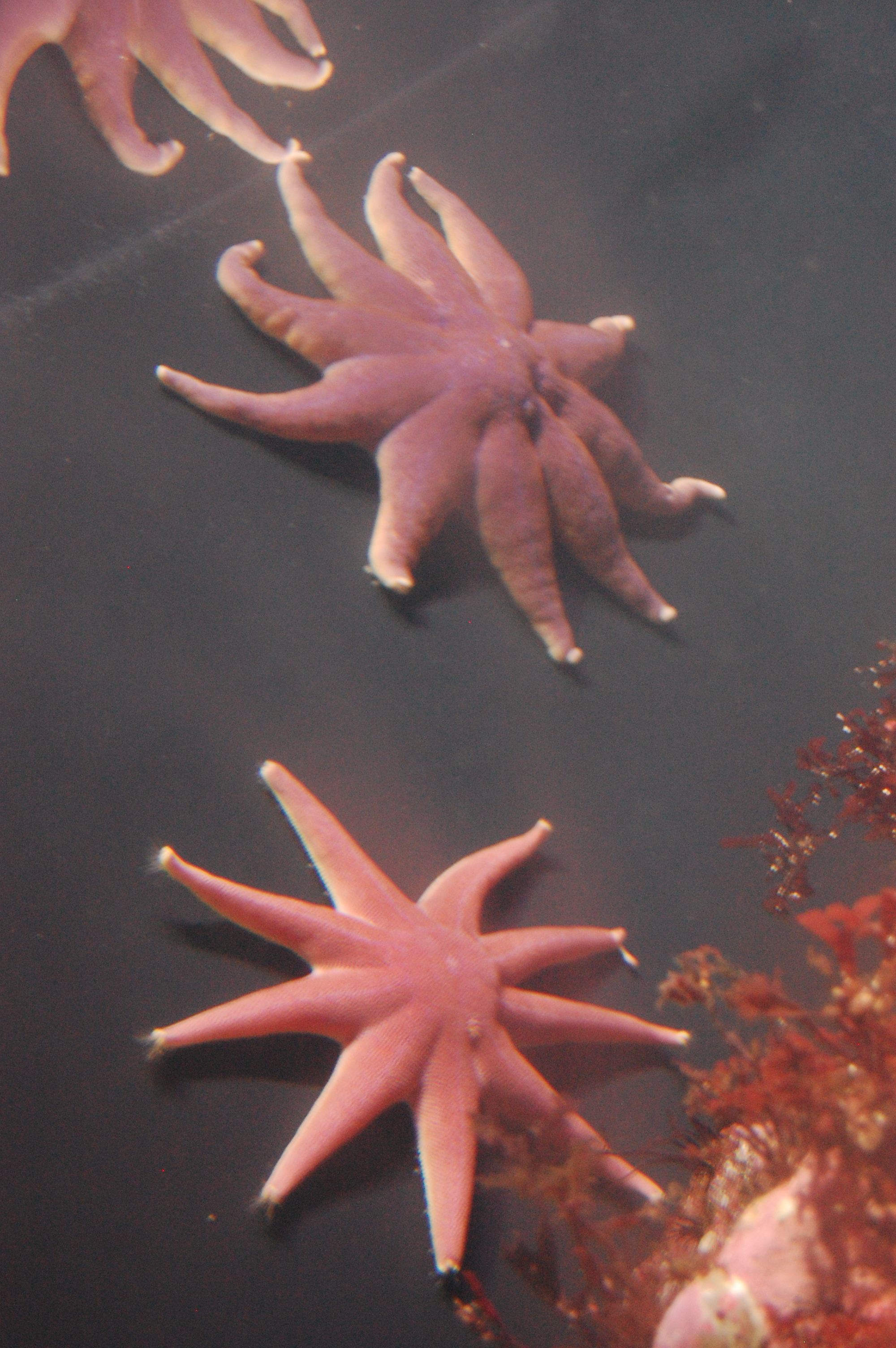
Solaster endeca

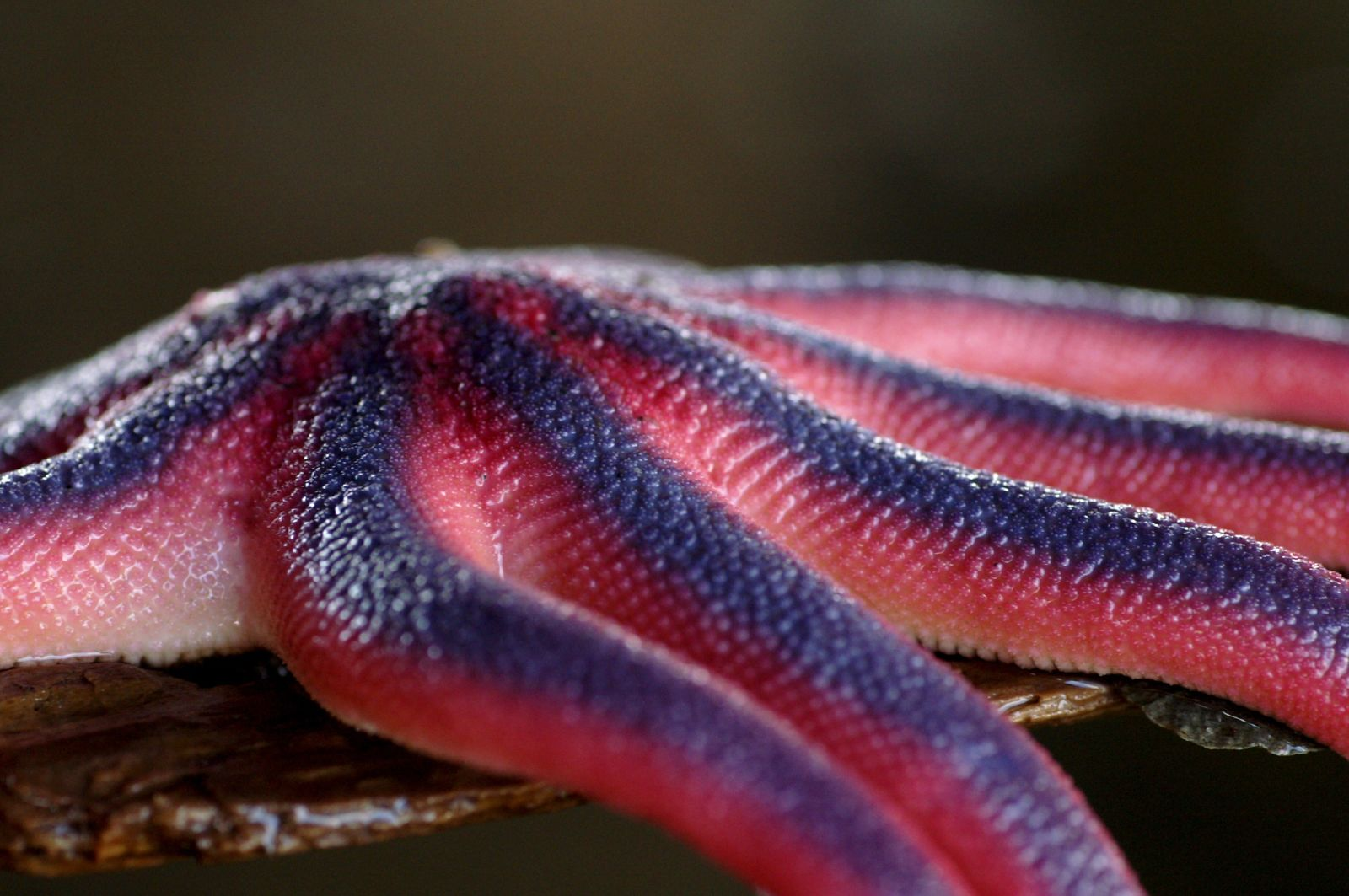
Solaster stimpsoni

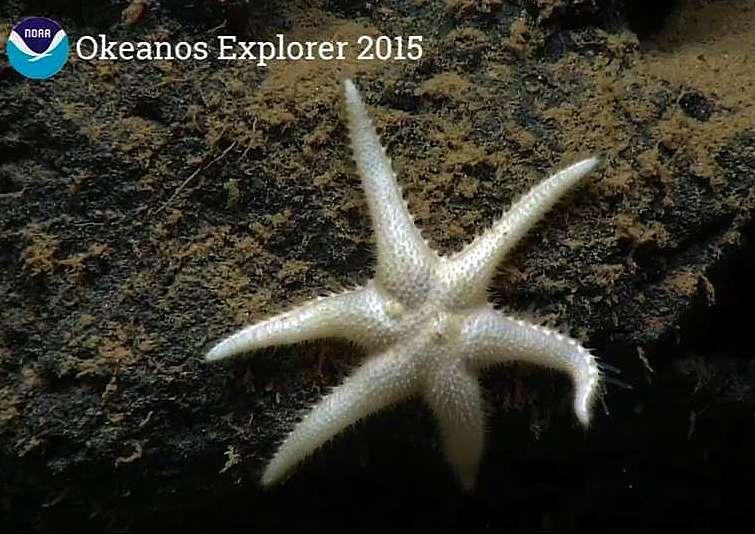
Laetmaster spectabilis
