= Cladaster salebra =

Scientific classification
- Kingdom: Animalia
- Phylum: Echinodermata
- Class: Asteroidea
- Order: Valvatida
- Family: Goniasteridae
- Genus: Cladaster
- Species: C. salebra

Binomial name
- Cladaster salebra Mah, 2026

Species of sea star

Cladaster salebra is a species of sea star in the family Goniasteridae found off New Caledonia.

== Etymology ==
The species epithet salebra is Latin for "a rough road".

== Taxonomy and systematics ==
This species is differentiated based on the presence of 6 furrow spines as well as the presence of abactinal plates extending to the arm terminus. Other Cladaster species possess 2 to 4 furrow spines and are all known to possess abutted superomarginals across the arm radius. Cladaster salebra displays subambulacral pedicellariae, which are absent on the Indian Ocean Cladaster katafractarius and the high-latitude Cladaster analogus.

== Description ==
The species has a stout, stellate body with triangular arms that have pointed tips. Abactinal plates are abutted, individually polygonal to round in shape, larger on the disk and smaller distally, adjacent to the superomarginal contact, and extend along the arm to the terminus. Granules, numbering 1 to 10 (mostly 3 to 6), are very widely spaced on each plate. There are 16 superomarginal plates and 20 inferomarginal plates per interradius (arm tip to arm tip). The surfaces of both superomarginal and inferomarginal plates bear 20–40 (mostly 30) widely spaced granules. Furrow spines number 6. A single large subambulacral spine is present, adjacent to a similarly large, forceps-like pedicellariae.

== Distribution and habitat ==
This species is known from off New Caledonia at a depth of 1054 meters. The holotype was collected from a sandy, sedimented bottom.
