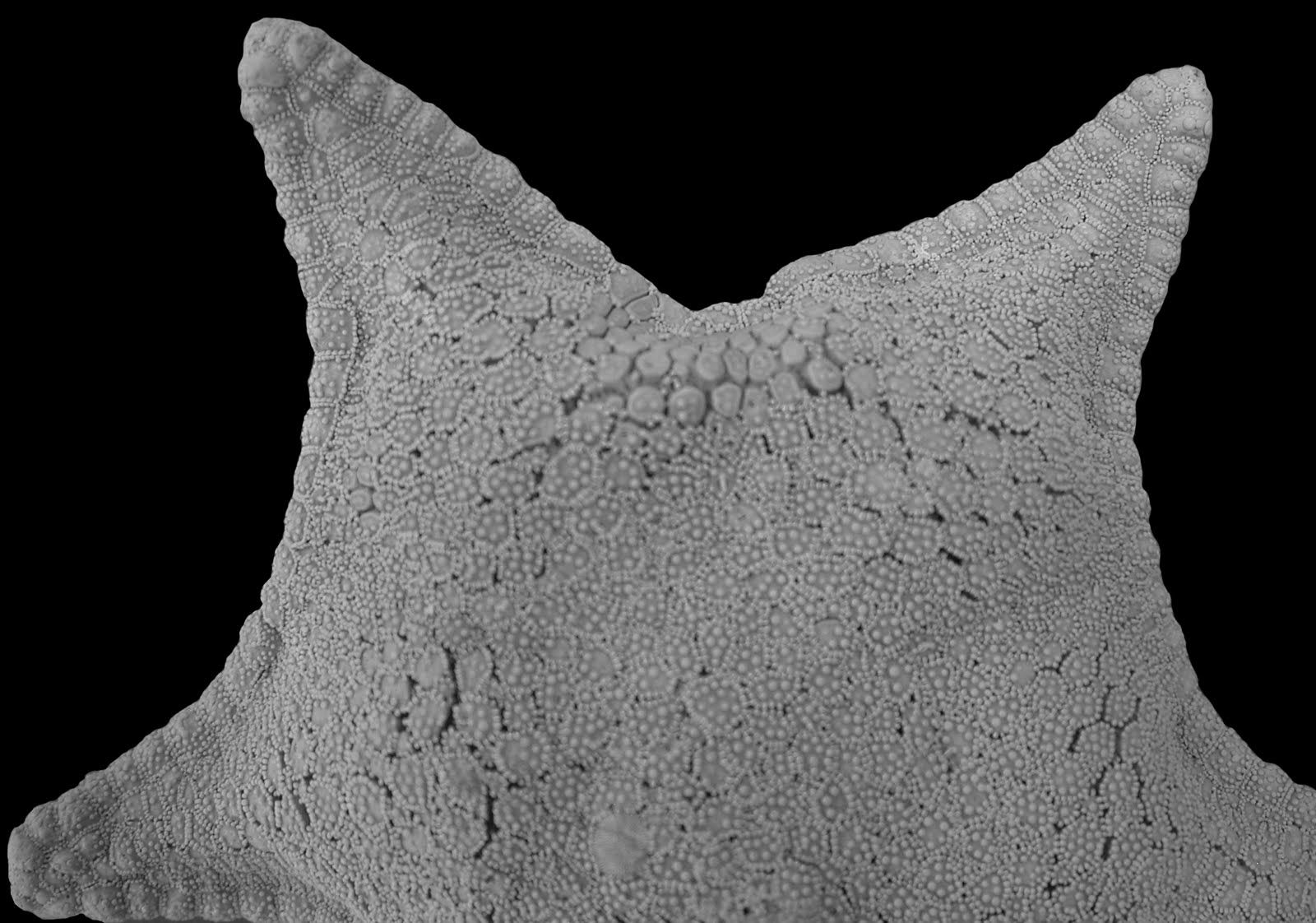
- Cladaster analogus

Scientific classification
- Kingdom: Animalia
- Phylum: Echinodermata
- Class: Asteroidea
- Order: Valvatida
- Family: Goniasteridae
- Genus: Cladaster; Verrill, 1899

= Cladaster =

Genus of starfishes

Cladaster is a genus of echinoderms belonging to the family Goniasteridae.

The genus has almost cosmopolitan distribution.

== Species ==
Species include:

- Cladaster analogus Fisher, 1940
- Cladaster carrioni Medina & Del Valle, 1983
- Cladaster katafractarius Mah, 2018
- Cladaster macrobrachius H.L. Clark, 1923
- Cladaster rudis Verrill, 1899
- Cladaster salebra Mah, 2026
- Cladaster validus Fisher, 1910
