= Ectenessini =

Scientific classification
- Domain: Eukaryota
- Kingdom: Animalia
- Phylum: Arthropoda
- Class: Insecta
- Order: Coleoptera
- Suborder: Polyphaga
- Infraorder: Cucujiformia
- Family: Cerambycidae
- Subfamily: Cerambycinae
- Tribe: Ectenessini

Tribe of beetles

Ectenessini is a tribe of beetles in the subfamily Cerambycinae, containing the following genera:

- Acanthonessa
- Bomarion
- Cotynessa
- Ectenessa
- Ectenesseca
- Ectenessidia
- Eurymerus
- Lissoeme
- Meryeurus
- Niophis
- Paralissoeme
- Tricheurymerus
