= List of echinoderms of the Houtman Abrolhos =

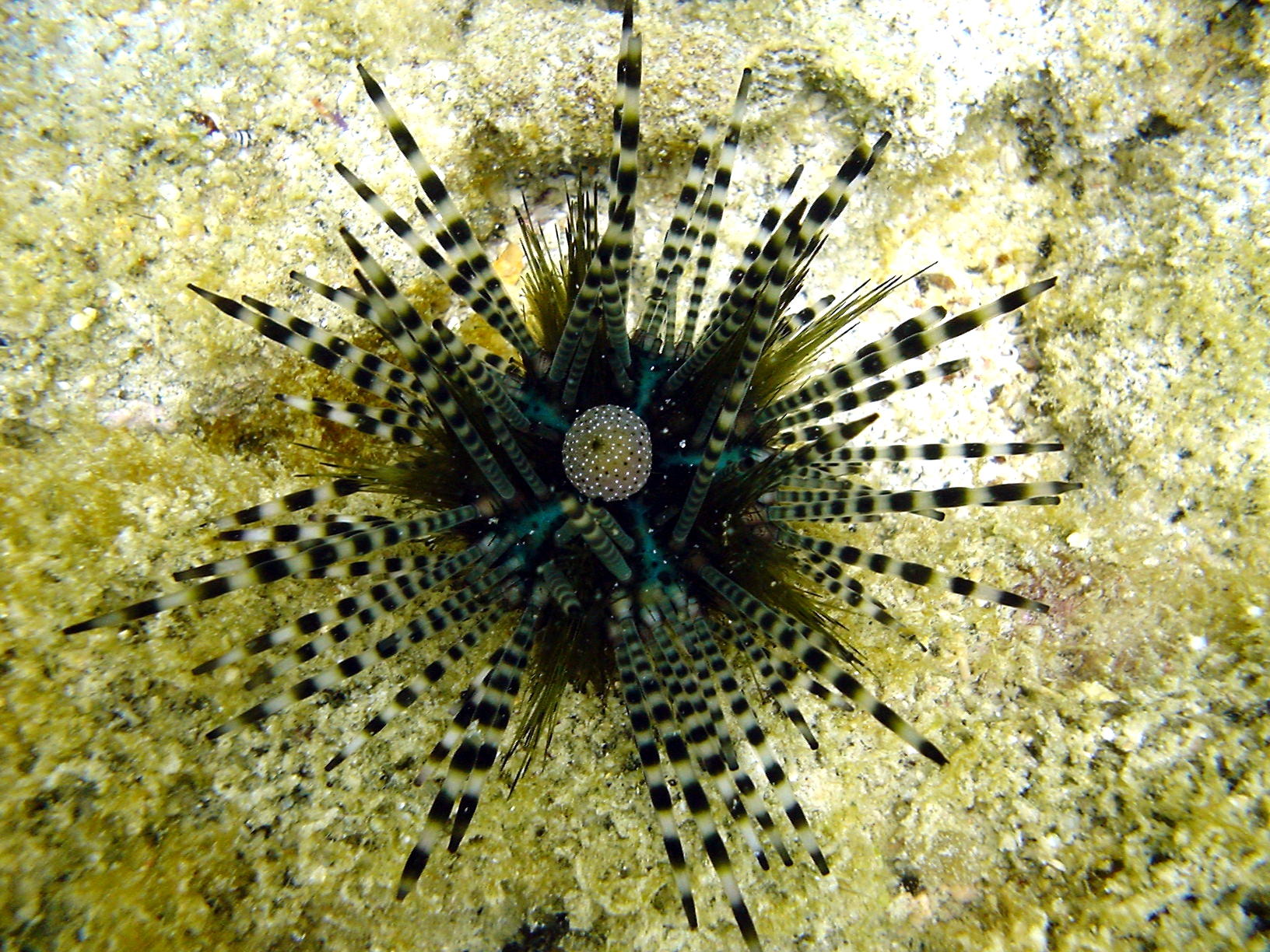
Echinothrix calamaris (double spined urchin)

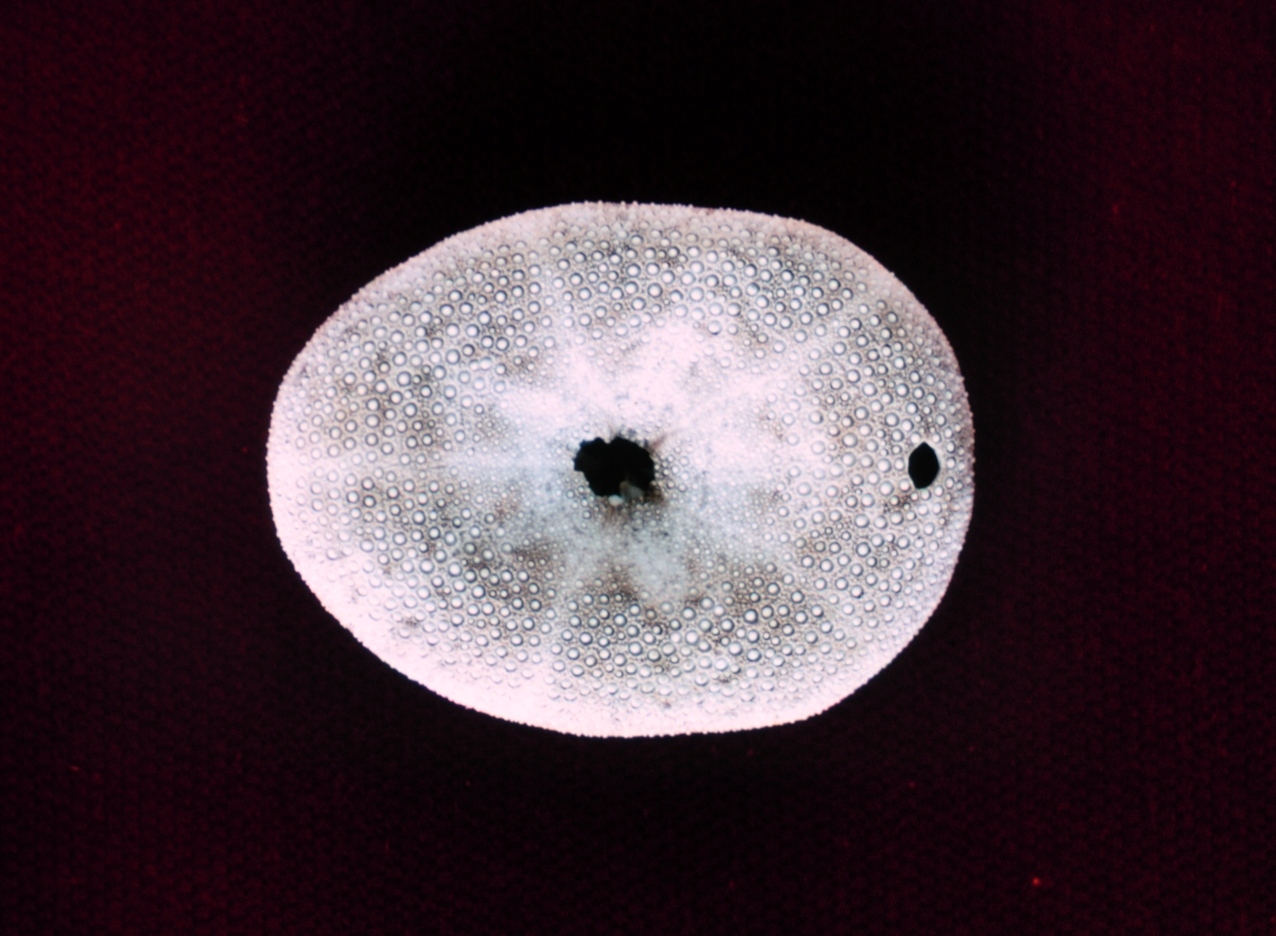
Clypeaster reticulatus (cake urchin)

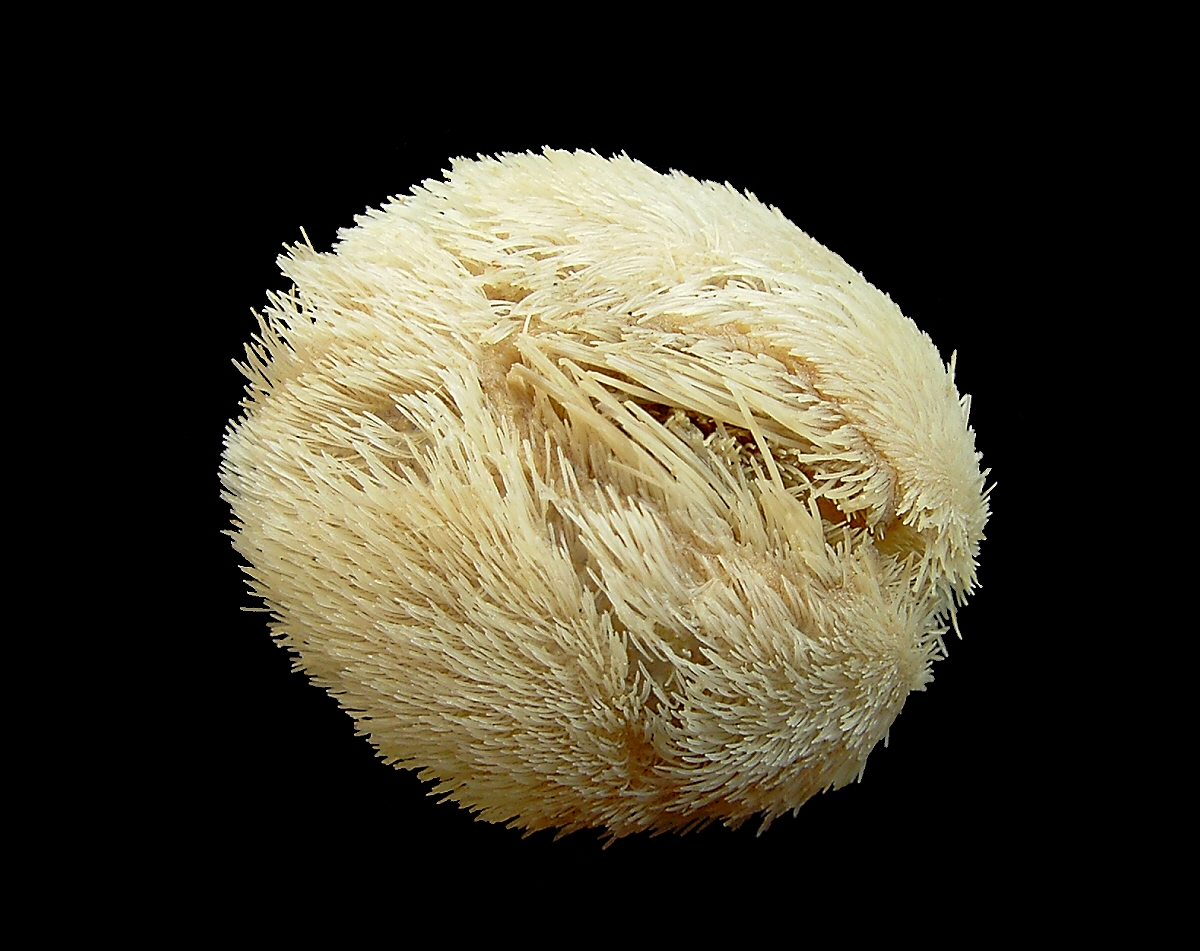
Echinocardium cordatum

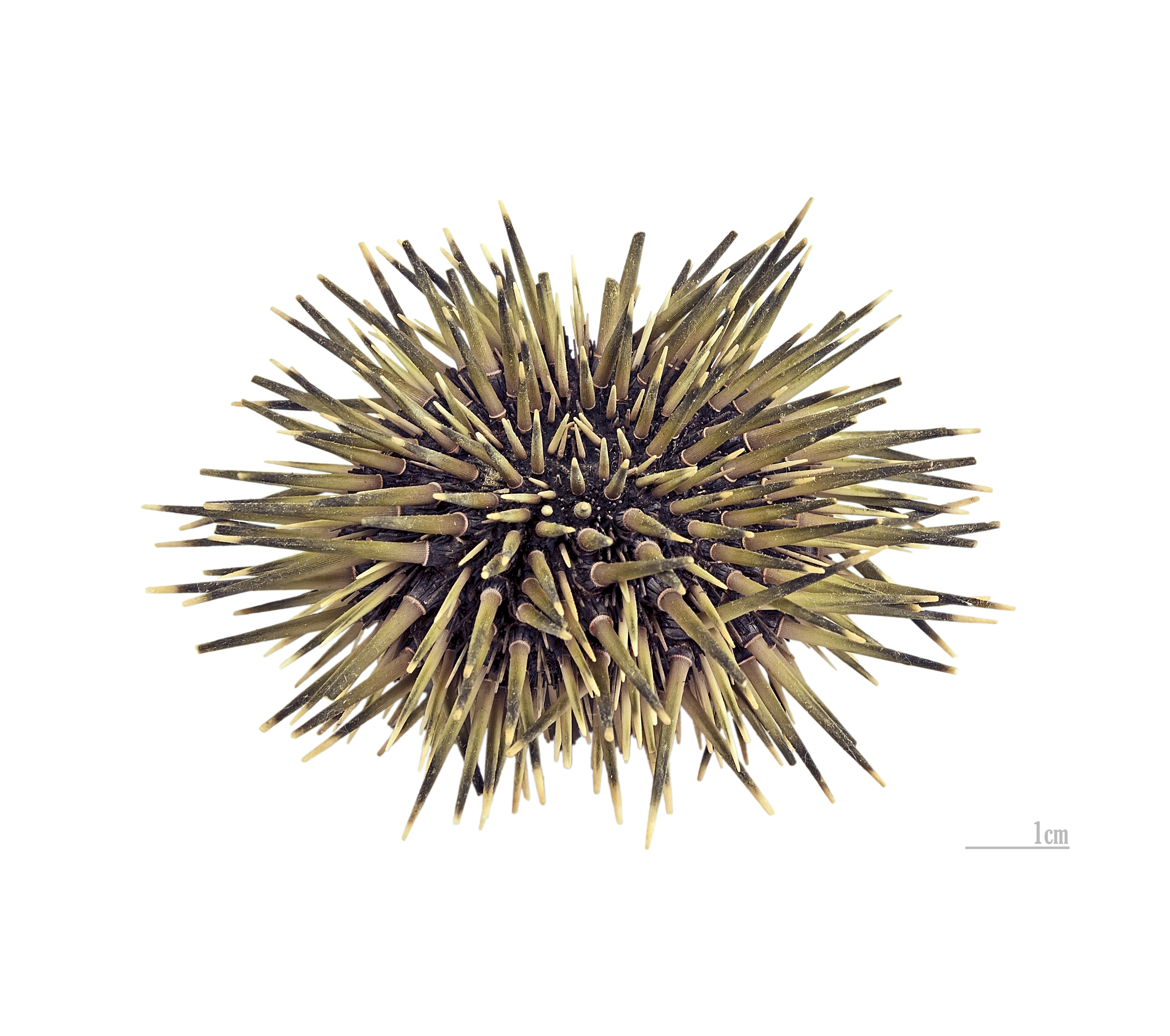
Echinometra mathaei

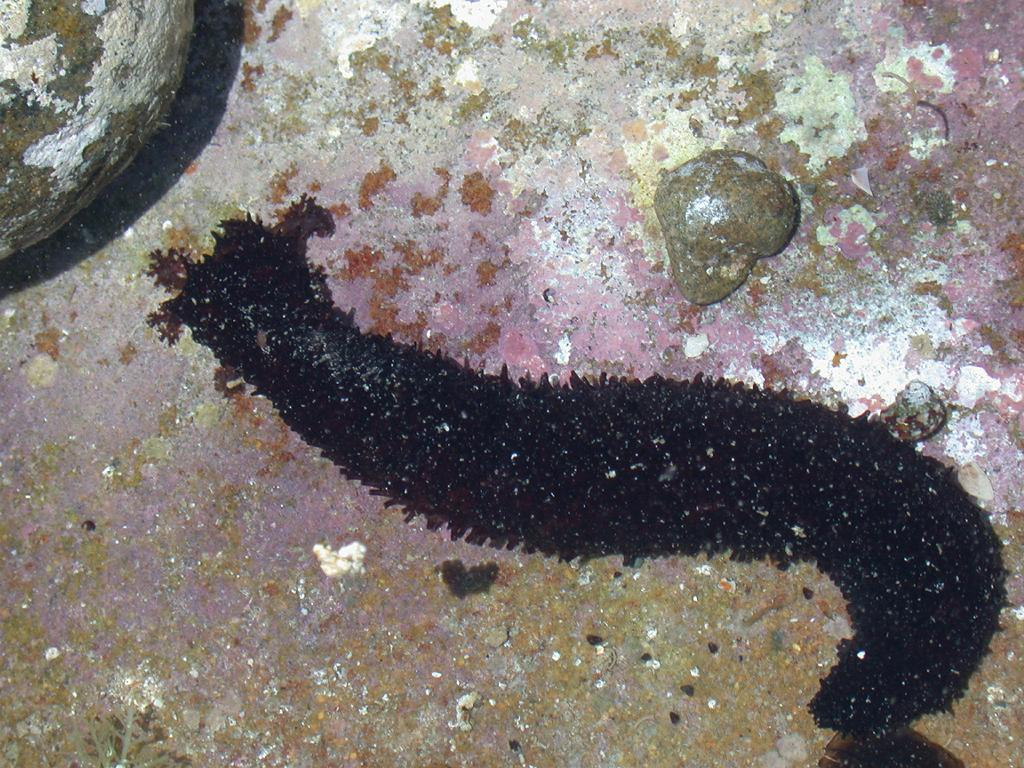
Holothuria leucospilota

The marine waters of the Houtman Abrolhos, an island chain off the coast of Western Australia, has been recorded as containing 172 species of echinoderm in ?? genera. This extremely high diversity has been attributed to a combination of factors, namely: the position of the Houtman Abrolhos within a biotone between temperate and tropical waters; the wide variety of habitats; and the Leeuwin Current, which both transports tropical species southwards, and keeps the reef warm enough for them to survive. This is a list of echinoderms of the Houtman Abrolhos:

== Crinoidea ==
- Capillaster multiradiatus
- Clarkcomanthus littoralis
- Comanthus alternans
- Comanthus briareus
- Comanthus gisleni
- Comanthus parvicirrus
- Comanthus wahlbergi
- Comanthina variabilis
- Comaster distinctus
- Comatella maculata
- Comatella nigra
- Comatella stelligera
- Comatula pectinata
- Comatula purpurea
- Comatula solaris
- Comatulella brachiolata
- Zygometra comata
- Zygometra elegans
- Decametra studeri
- Petrasometra clarae
- Petrasometra helianthoides
- Amphimetra tessellata
- Lamprometra palmata
- Tropiometra afra
- Ptilometra macronema
- Neometra conaminis
- Antedon parviflora
- Dorometra nana

== Asteroidea ==
- Luidia maculata
- Astropecten granulatus
- Astropecten preissi
- Astropecten triseriatus
- Astropecten vappa
- Astropecten zebra
- Archaster angulatus
- Pentagonaster duebeni
- Stellaster inspinosus
- Goniodiscaster seriatus
- Anthenea australiae
- Anthenea obesa
- Gymnanthenea globigera
- Nectria macrobrachia
- Pentaceraster alveolatus
- Pentaceraster gracilis
- Pentaceraster regulus
- Protoreaster alveolatus
- Asterodiscides culcitulus
- Asterodiscides macroplax
- Asterodiscides soelae
- Petricia vernicina
- Austrofromia polypora
- Bunaster variegatus
- Fromia indica
- Fromia monilis
- Fromia pacifica
- Leiaster leachi
- Linckia guildingi
- Linckia multiflora
- Nardoa galatheae
- Ophidiaster cribrarius
- Metrodira subulata
- Anseropoda rosacea
- Asterina cepheus
- Manasterina longispina
- Nepanthia crassa
- Paranepanthia rosea
- Patiriella brevispina (purple seastar)
- Euretaster insignis
- Echinaster arcystatus
- Echinaster glomeratus
- Echinaster varicolor
- Allostichaster polyplax
- Coscinasterias calamaria (eleven-armed seastar)

== Ophiuroidea ==
- Ophiomyxa australis
- Astrobrachion adhaerens
- Astroboa granulatus
- Astrosierra microconus
- Euryale aspera
- Amphioplus depressus
- Amphipholis squamata
- Amphistigma minuta
- Amphiura brachyactis
- Amphiura constricta
- Amphiura multiremula
- Amphiura nannodes
- Amphiura septemspinosa
- Amphiura velox
- Ophiactis acosmeta
- Ophiactis luteomaculata
- Ophiactis modesta
- Ophiactis resiliens
- Ophiactis savignya
- Ophiactis tricolor
- Macrophiothrix caenosa
- Macrophiothrix paucispina
- Ophiothela danae
- Ophiothrix caespitosa
- Ophiothrix ciliaris
- Ophiothrix spongicola
- Ophiocoma dentata
- Ophiocoma erinaceus
- Ophiocoma occidentalis
- Ophiocoma pusilla
- Ophiocomella sexradia
- Ophionereis dubia
- Ophionereis schayeri
- Ophiarachnella gorgonia
- Ophiarachnella ramsayi
- Ophioconis cincta
- Dictenophiura stellata
- Ophiocrossota multispina
- Ophioplocus imbricatus
- Ophiura kinbergi

== Echinoidea ==
- Phyllacanthus irregularis
- Prionocidaris baculosa
- Prionocidaris bispinosa
- Asthenosoma ijimai
- Asthenosoma varium
- Centrostephanus tenuispinus
- Diadema savignyi
- Diadema setosum (long-spined sea urchin)
- Echinothrix calamaris (double spined urchin)
- Amblypneustes pallidus
- Holopneustes porosissimus
- Salmaciella dussumieri
- Temnopleurus alexandri
- Nudechinus scotiopremnus
- Pseudoboletia indiana
- Tripneustes gratilla
- Echinometra mathaei
- Echinostrephus molaris
- Heliocidaris erythrogramma
- Echinodiscus auritus
- Clypeaster fervens
- Clypeaster reticulatus (cake urchin)
- Peronella lesueuri
- Peronella orbicularis
- Breynia desorii
- Echinocardium cordatum

== Holothuroidea ==
- Actinopyga echinites
- Bohadschia argus
- Holothuria coluber
- Holothuria atra
- Holothuria edulis
- Holothuria pardalis
- Holothuria leucospilota
- Holothuria fuscocinerea
- Holothuria nobilis
- Holothuria difficilis
- Holothuria cinerascens
- Holothuria dofleini
- Holothuria pervicax
- Holothuria michaelseni
- Holothuria arenicola
- Holothuria hartmeyeri
- Holothuria hilla
- Holothuria impatiens
- Stichopus horrens
- Stichopus ludwigi
- Stichopus mollis
- Stichopus monotuberculatus
- Stichopus variegatus
- Paracaudina tetrapora
- Cucumaria bicolor
- Cucumella mutans
- Pentacta anceps
- Pentacta crassa
- Pentacta quadrangularis
- Thyone papuensis
- Cladolabes hamatus
- Synaptula recta
- Leptosynapta dolabrifera (snot sea cucumber)

== Notes ==
Published surveys have not included observations of the crown-of-thorns starfish (Ananthaster planci), and this species is therefore not listed above. However, individuals have occasionally been observed at the Houtman Abrolhos.
