= L. maculata =

L. maculata may refer to:

- Labrichthys maculata, a wrasse native to the coast of southern Australia
- Lambis maculata, a true conch
- Leptodeira maculata, a cat-eyed snake
- Leucophenga maculata, a fruit fly
- Lipocarpha maculata, a halfchaff sedge
- Lissoeme maculata, a longhorn beetle
- Lophocampa maculata, a Northern American moth
- Luidia maculata, a Pacific starfish
- Lutica maculata, a zodariid spider
- Lysiosquillina maculata, a mantis shrimp

== Synonyms ==
- Ledebouria maculata, a synonym for Drimiopsis maculata, a plant species
