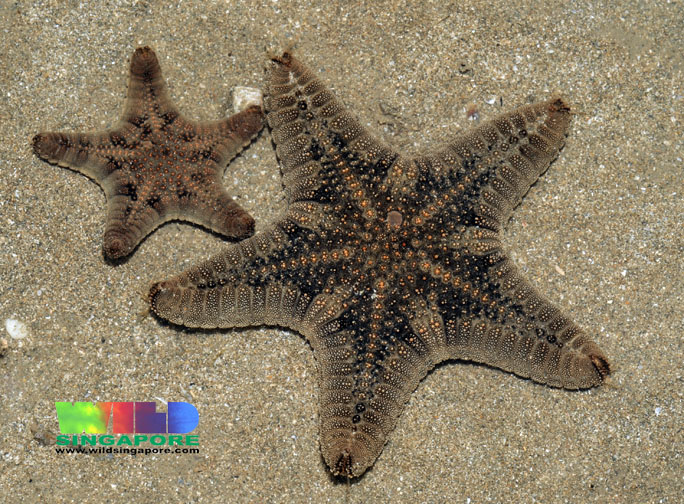
- Biscuit sea star (Goniodiscaster scaber)

Scientific classification
- Kingdom: Animalia
- Phylum: Echinodermata
- Class: Asteroidea
- Order: Valvatida
- Family: Oreasteridae
- Genus: Goniodiscaster; H.L. Clark, 1909

Species
- See text.

= Goniodiscaster =

Genus of starfishes

Goniodiscaster is a genus of sea stars in the family Oreasteridae. Members of this genus can be found off the coasts of India, southeast Asia, and Australia. Other taxa commonly misidentified as this genus include Anthenea, Tosia, and Pentaceraster.

== Selected species ==
- Goniodiscaster acanthodes H.L. Clark, 1938
- Goniodiscaster australiae Tortonese, 1937
- Goniodiscaster bicolor H.L. Clark, 1938
- Goniodiscaster foraminatus (Döderlein, 1916)
- Goniodiscaster forficulatus (Perrier, 1875)
- Goniodiscaster granuliferus (J.E.Gray, 1847)
- Goniodiscaster insignis (Koehler, 1910)
- Goniodiscaster integer Livingstone, 1931
- Goniodiscaster pleyadella (Lamarck, 1816)
- Goniodiscaster porosus (Koehler, 1910)
- Goniodiscaster rugosus (Perrier, 1875)
- Goniodiscaster scaber (Möbius, 1859)
- Goniodiscaster seriatus (Müller & Troschel, 1843)
- Goniodiscaster vallei (Koehler, 1910)

List source :
