= Pentagonaster =

Pentagonaster may refer to:

- Kunzea, a genus of shrub
- Pentagonaster (echinoderm), a genus of sea star
