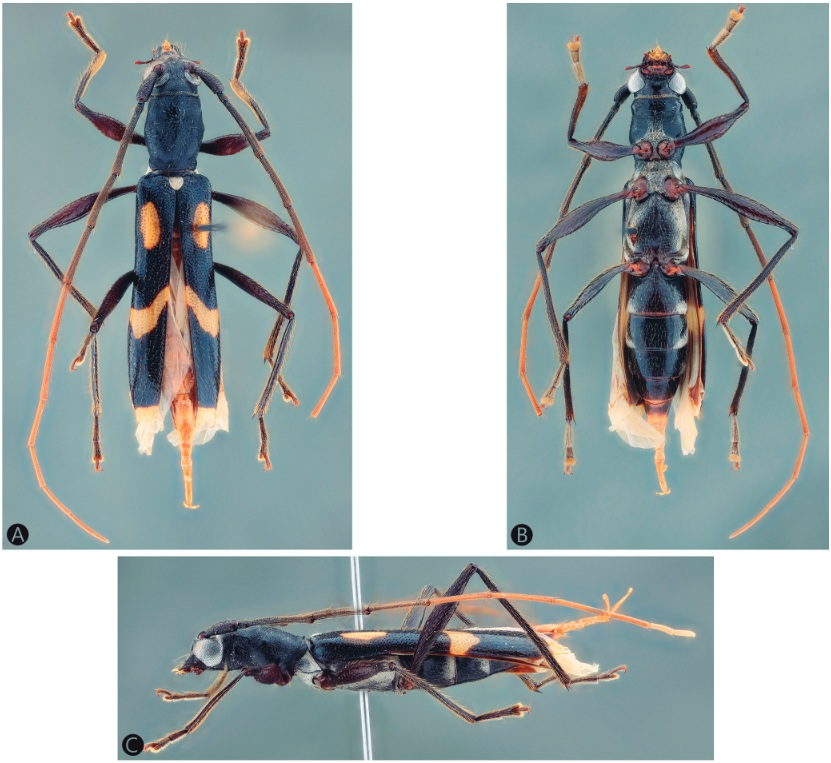

Scientific classification
- Kingdom: Animalia
- Phylum: Arthropoda
- Clade: Pancrustacea
- Class: Insecta
- Order: Coleoptera
- Suborder: Polyphaga
- Infraorder: Cucujiformia
- Family: Cerambycidae
- Genus: Ectenessa
- Species: E. monnei

Binomial name
- Ectenessa monnei Da Silva, Monne, Santos-Silva & Rafael, 2026

= Ectenessa monnei =

Species of beetle

Ectenessa monnei is a species of beetle of the family Cerambycidae. It is found in Brazil (Amazonas).

== Description ==
Adults reach a length of about 13.4–16.4 mm (0.53–0.65 in). The integument is mostly black, with the sides of the labrum pale and the ventral mouthparts dark brown with some areas reddish brown. The scape, pedicel, and antennomeres III‑V are dark brown, while antennomeres VI‑XI are orange. The elytra have elliptical yellowish‑brown macula dorsally on the anterior half, and a transverse yellowish‑brown band after the middle, from the epipleural to the sutural margins, this band is oblique from the middle of the dorsal surface toward the suture, and pale‑yellow on the apex. The coxae are dark brown with reddish brown areas and the trochanters are mostly dark reddish brown, except for the orangish‑brown base of the metatrochanters. The tarsi are dark brown, except for the reddish brown apex of the lobes of tarsomeres III and entire tarsomeres IV‑V. The tarsal claws are mostly yellowish brown. The abdominal tergites are mostly orangish, the apex of ventrite 4 orangish, ventrite 5 brown on the basal half, and orange on the apical half.

== Etymology ==
The species is named in honour of Dr. Miguel A. Monné.
