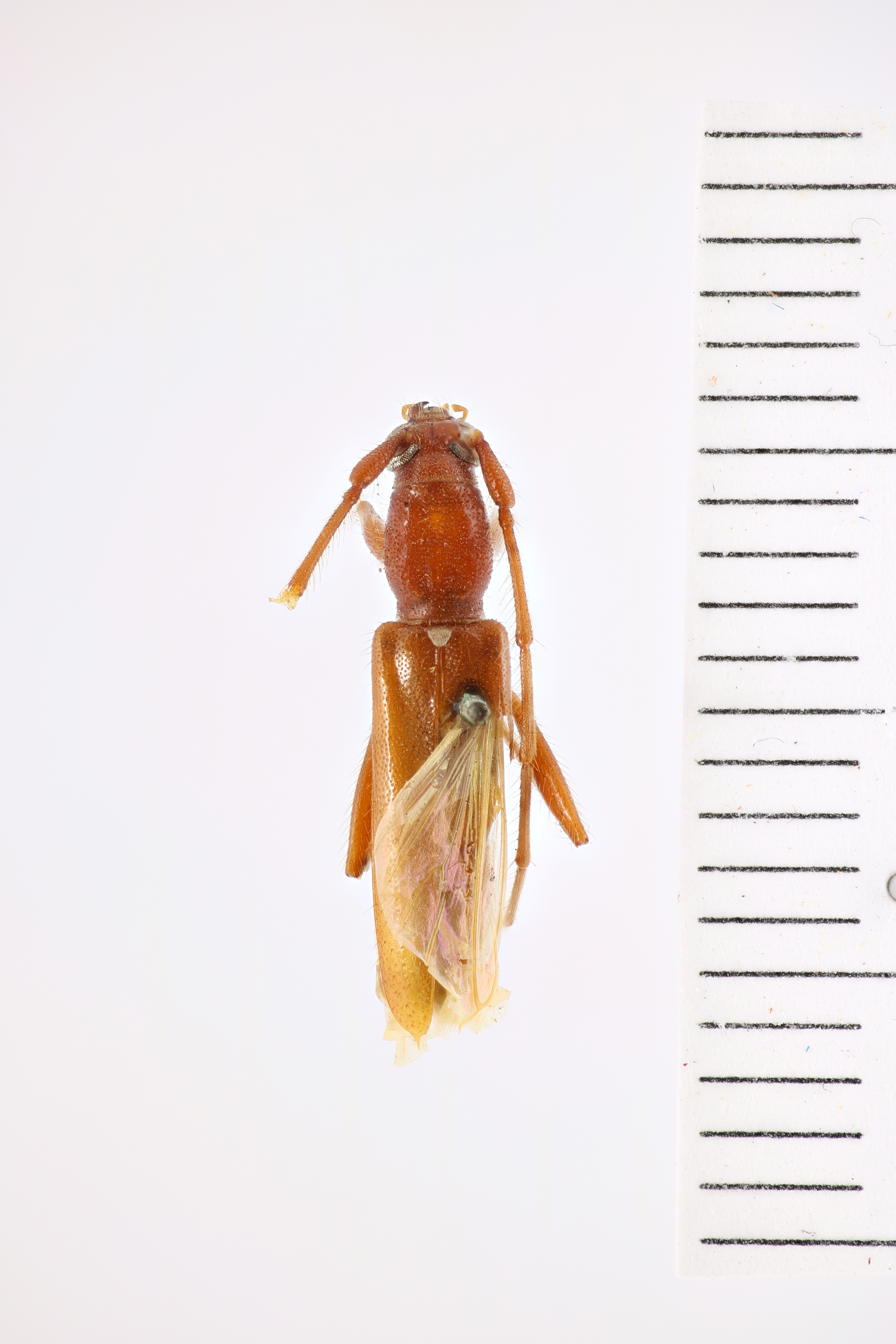
- Photo of the specimen, 2000

Scientific classification
- Domain: Eukaryota
- Kingdom: Animalia
- Phylum: Arthropoda
- Class: Insecta
- Order: Coleoptera
- Suborder: Polyphaga
- Infraorder: Cucujiformia
- Family: Cerambycidae
- Genus: Ectenessa
- Species: E. nitida

Binomial name
- Ectenessa nitida Bates, 1885

= Ectenessa nitida =

Species of beetle

Ectenessa nitida is a species of beetle in the family Cerambycidae. It was described by Henry Walter Bates in 1885.
