= Ectenessidia nigriventris =

Scientific classification
- Domain: Eukaryota
- Kingdom: Animalia
- Phylum: Arthropoda
- Class: Insecta
- Order: Coleoptera
- Suborder: Polyphaga
- Infraorder: Cucujiformia
- Family: Cerambycidae
- Genus: Ectenessidia
- Species: E. nigriventris

Binomial name
- Ectenessidia nigriventris (Belon, 1902)

Species of beetle

Ectenessidia nigriventris is a species of beetle in the family Cerambycidae. It was described by Belon in 1902.
