= Goniodiscaster insignis =

Scientific classification
- Kingdom: Animalia
- Phylum: Echinodermata
- Class: Asteroidea
- Order: Valvatida
- Family: Oreasteridae
- Genus: Goniodiscaster
- Species: G. insignis

Binomial name
- Goniodiscaster insignis (Koehler, 1910)

Species of starfish

Goniodiscaster insignis is a species of sea stars in the family Oreasteridae.
