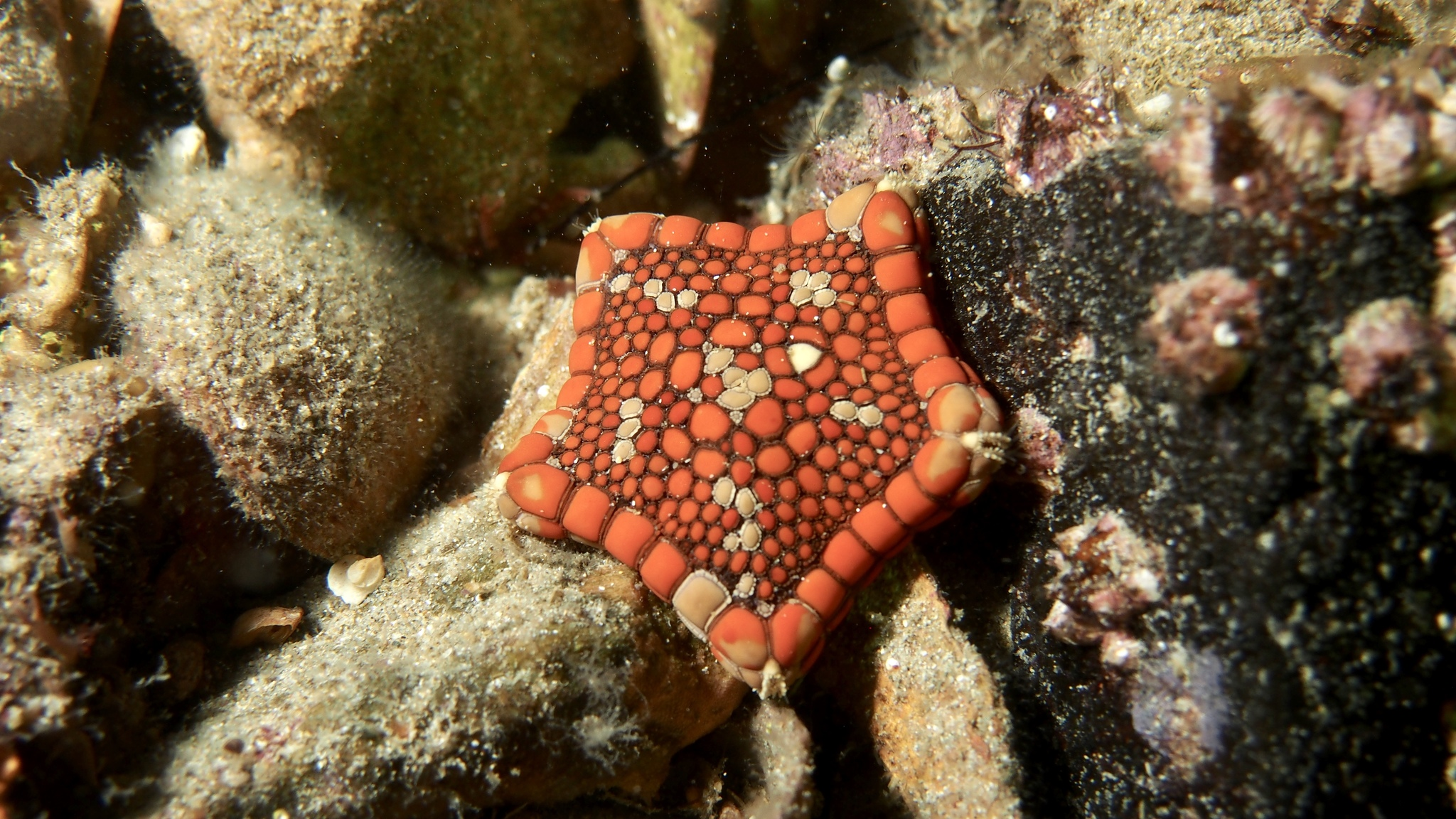

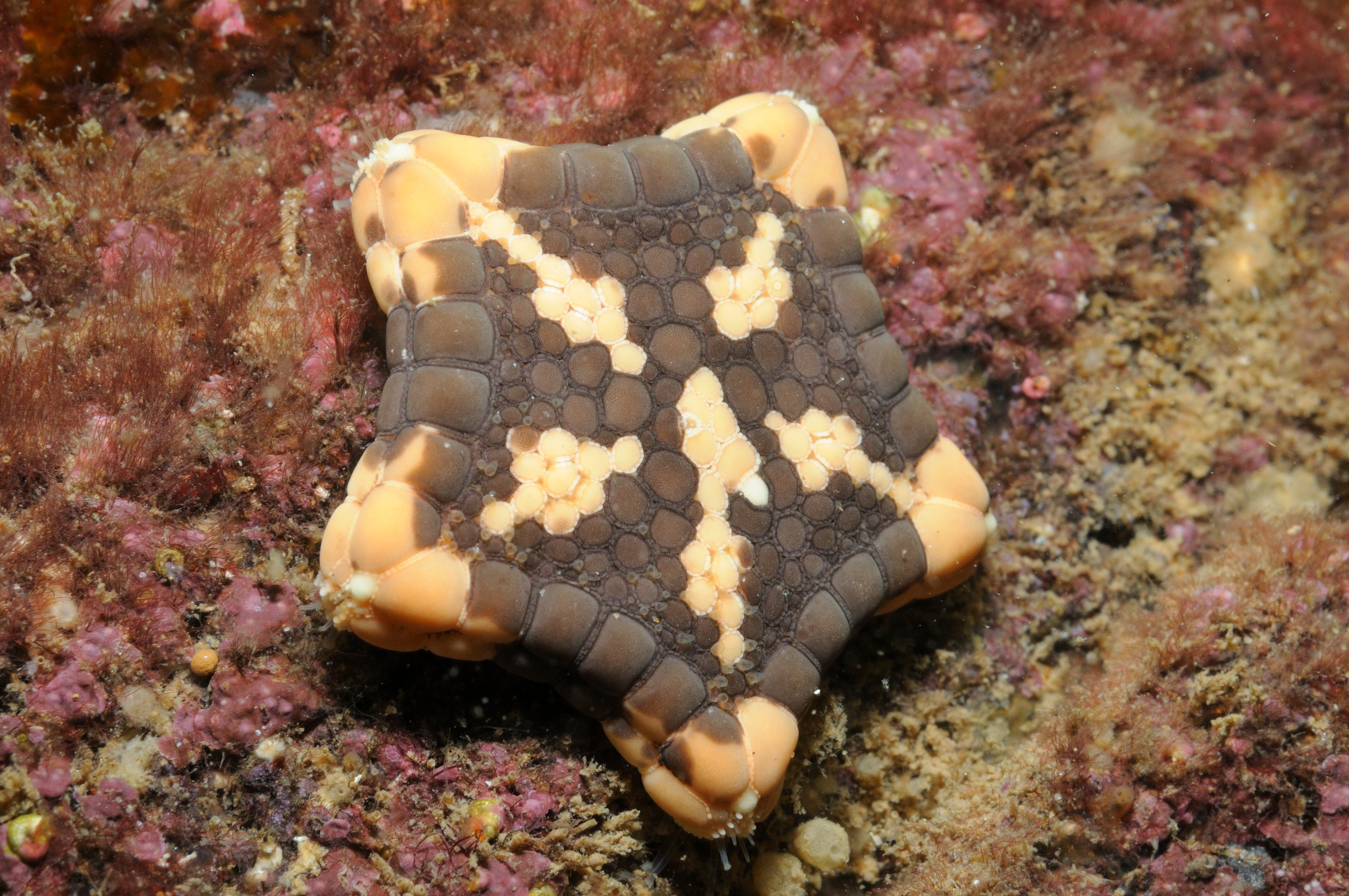

Scientific classification
- Kingdom: Animalia
- Phylum: Echinodermata
- Class: Asteroidea
- Order: Valvatida
- Family: Goniasteridae
- Genus: Tosia
- Species: T. neossia

Binomial name
- Tosia neossia Naughton & O'Hara, 2009

= Tosia neossia =

Species of starfish

Tosia neossia is a species of endemic Australian starfish in the family Goniasteridae.

Tosia neossia lives in littoral areas, in rock pools, and in shallow waters not exceeding 26 metres (85 ft) deep, both in open areas and hidden under rocks. It is distributed along the southern coast of the Australian state of Victoria, in the extreme southeastern coast of South Australia, and around Tasmania and the Bass Strait, making it an endemic Australian species.

Tosia neossia is carnivorous and feeds on sponges and other invertebrates.

Tosia neossia eggs are orange and measure about 700 μm.
