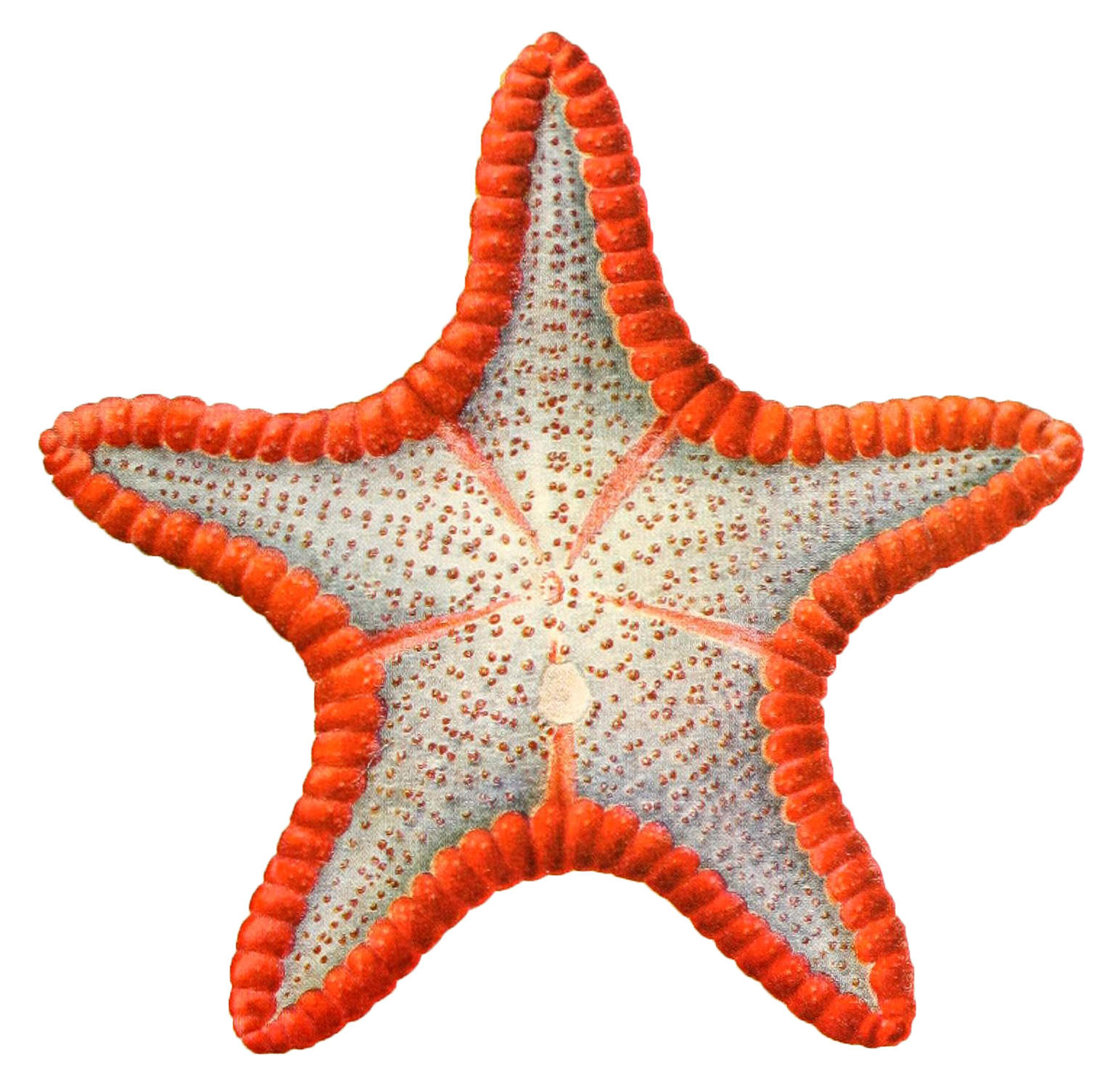

Scientific classification
- Kingdom: Animalia
- Phylum: Echinodermata
- Class: Asteroidea
- Order: Valvatida
- Family: Oreasteridae
- Genus: Goniodiscaster
- Species: G. acanthodes

Binomial name
- Goniodiscaster acanthodes H.L. Clark, 1938

= Goniodiscaster acanthodes =

Species of starfish

Goniodiscaster acanthodes is a species of sea stars in the family Oreasteridae.
