= Goniodiscaster foraminatus =

Scientific classification
- Kingdom: Animalia
- Phylum: Echinodermata
- Class: Asteroidea
- Order: Valvatida
- Family: Oreasteridae
- Genus: Goniodiscaster
- Species: G. foraminatus

Binomial name
- Goniodiscaster foraminatus Döderlein, 1916

Species of starfish

Goniodiscaster foraminatus is a species of sea stars in the family Oreasteridae.
