= Niophis picticornis =

Scientific classification
- Domain: Eukaryota
- Kingdom: Animalia
- Phylum: Arthropoda
- Class: Insecta
- Order: Coleoptera
- Suborder: Polyphaga
- Infraorder: Cucujiformia
- Family: Cerambycidae
- Genus: Niophis
- Species: N. picticornis

Binomial name
- Niophis picticornis (Martins, 1964)

Species of beetle

Niophis picticornis is a species of beetle in the family Cerambycidae. It was described by Martins in 1964.
