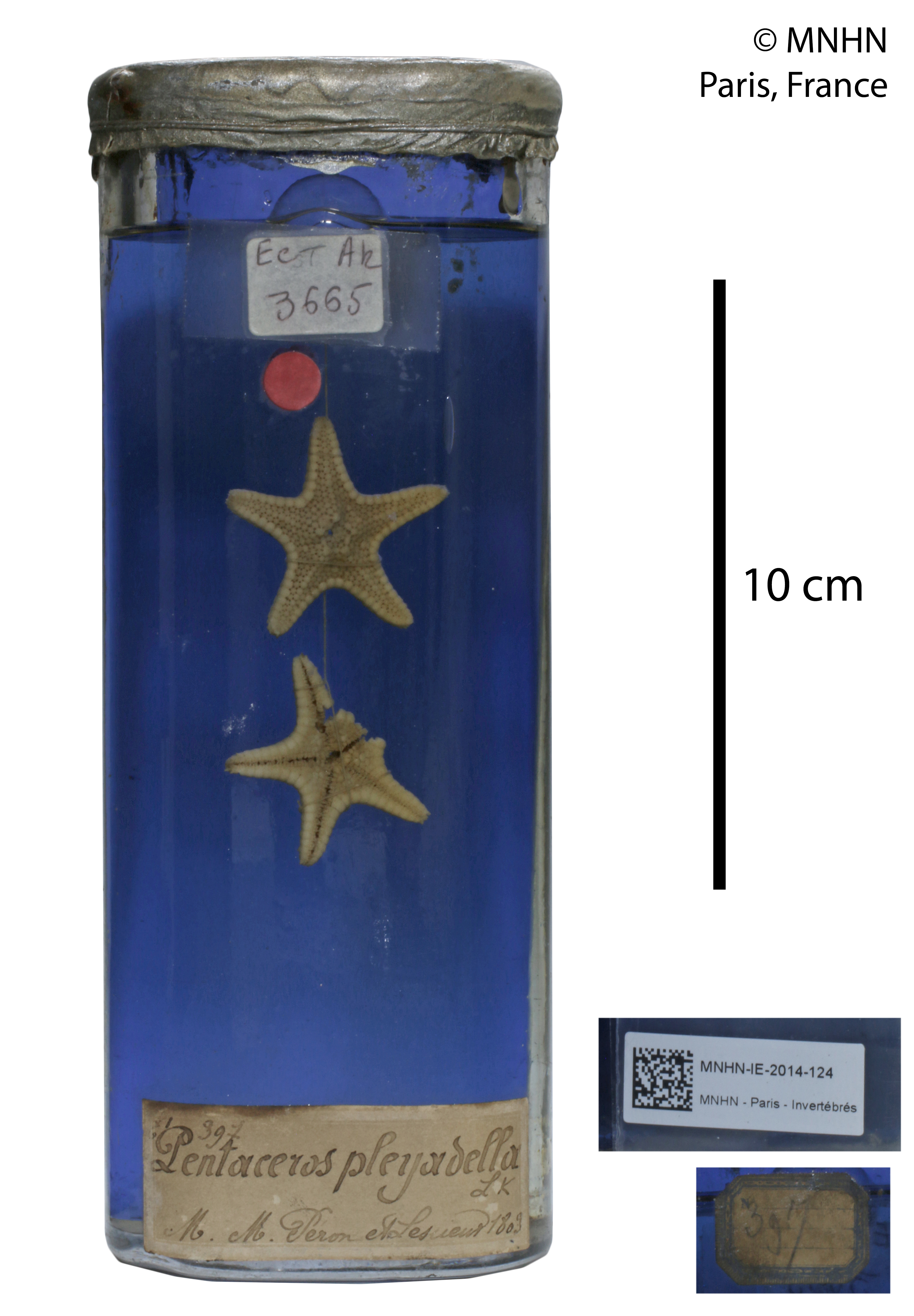
- Preserved specimens of Goniodiscaster pleyadella, Muséum National d'Histoire Naturelle, Paris

Scientific classification
- Kingdom: Animalia
- Phylum: Echinodermata
- Class: Asteroidea
- Order: Valvatida
- Family: Oreasteridae
- Genus: Goniodiscaster
- Species: G. pleyadella

Binomial name
- Goniodiscaster pleyadella (Lamarck, 1816)

= Goniodiscaster pleyadella =

Species of sea stars in the family Oreasteridae

Goniodiscaster pleyadella is a species of sea stars in the family Oreasteridae.
