= Bomarion amborense =

Scientific classification
- Domain: Eukaryota
- Kingdom: Animalia
- Phylum: Arthropoda
- Class: Insecta
- Order: Coleoptera
- Suborder: Polyphaga
- Infraorder: Cucujiformia
- Family: Cerambycidae
- Genus: Bomarion
- Species: B. amborense

Binomial name
- Bomarion amborense Galileo & Martins, 2008

Species of beetle

Bomarion amborense is a species of beetle in the family Cerambycidae. It was described by Galileo and Martins in 2008.
