= Goniodiscaster integer =

Scientific classification
- Domain: Eukaryota
- Kingdom: Animalia
- Phylum: Echinodermata
- Class: Asteroidea
- Order: Valvatida
- Family: Oreasteridae
- Genus: Goniodiscaster
- Species: G. integer

Binomial name
- Goniodiscaster integer Livingstone, 1931

Species of starfish

Goniodiscaster integer is a species of sea stars in the family Oreasteridae.
