= Ectenessa quadriguttata =

Scientific classification
- Domain: Eukaryota
- Kingdom: Animalia
- Phylum: Arthropoda
- Class: Insecta
- Order: Coleoptera
- Suborder: Polyphaga
- Infraorder: Cucujiformia
- Family: Cerambycidae
- Genus: Ectenessa
- Species: E. quadriguttata

Binomial name
- Ectenessa quadriguttata (Burmeister, 1865)

Species of beetle

Ectenessa quadriguttata is a species of beetle in the family Cerambycidae. It was described by Hermann Burmeister in 1865.
