= Ectenessidia =

Scientific classification
- Domain: Eukaryota
- Kingdom: Animalia
- Phylum: Arthropoda
- Class: Insecta
- Order: Coleoptera
- Suborder: Polyphaga
- Infraorder: Cucujiformia
- Family: Cerambycidae
- Tribe: Ectenessini
- Genus: Ectenessidia

Genus of beetles

Ectenessidia is a genus of beetles in the family Cerambycidae, containing the following species:

- Ectenessidia metallica Napp & Martins, 2006
- Ectenessidia nigriventris (Belon, 1902)
- Ectenessidia varians (Gounelle, 1909)
