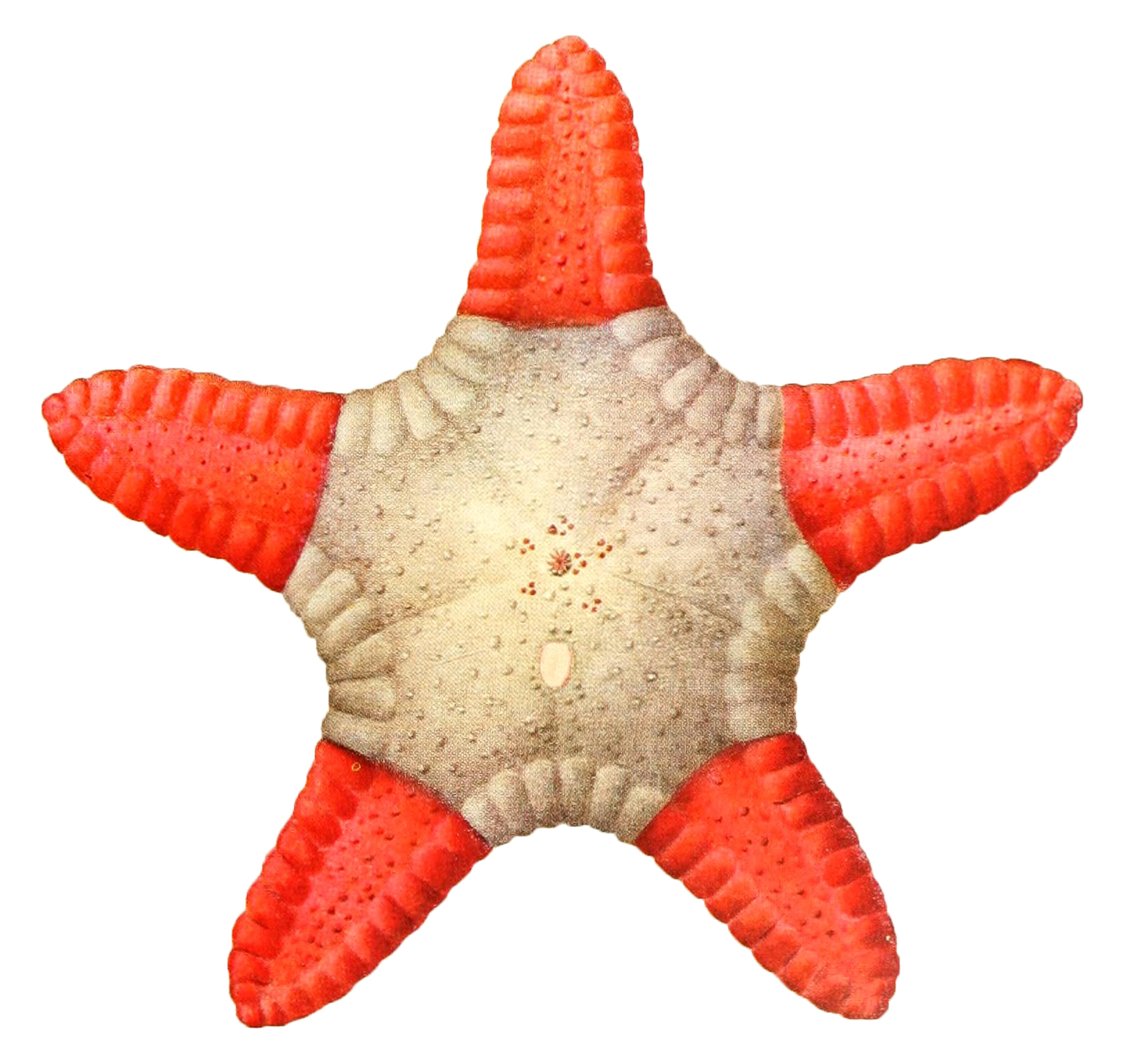

Scientific classification
- Kingdom: Animalia
- Phylum: Echinodermata
- Class: Asteroidea
- Order: Valvatida
- Family: Oreasteridae
- Genus: Goniodiscaster
- Species: G. bicolor

Binomial name
- Goniodiscaster bicolor H.L. Clark, 1938

= Goniodiscaster bicolor =

Species of starfish

Goniodiscaster bicolor is a species of sea stars in the family Oreasteridae.
