= Lissoeme =

Scientific classification
- Domain: Eukaryota
- Kingdom: Animalia
- Phylum: Arthropoda
- Class: Insecta
- Order: Coleoptera
- Suborder: Polyphaga
- Infraorder: Cucujiformia
- Family: Cerambycidae
- Tribe: Ectenessini
- Genus: Lissoeme

Genus of beetles

Lissoeme is a genus of beetles in the family Cerambycidae, containing the following species:

- Lissoeme maculata Martins & Galileo, 1998
- Lissoeme testacea Martins Chemsak & Linsley, 1966
