= Ectenessa guttigera =

Scientific classification
- Domain: Eukaryota
- Kingdom: Animalia
- Phylum: Arthropoda
- Class: Insecta
- Order: Coleoptera
- Suborder: Polyphaga
- Infraorder: Cucujiformia
- Family: Cerambycidae
- Genus: Ectenessa
- Species: E. guttigera

Binomial name
- Ectenessa guttigera (H. Lucas, 1857)

Species of beetle

Ectenessa guttigera is a species of beetle in the family Cerambycidae. It was described by Hippolyte Lucas in 1857.

The larvae of this beetle usually drill into wood and can cause damage to live logs or wood that has been felled.
