= Ectenessa decorata =

Scientific classification
- Kingdom: Animalia
- Phylum: Arthropoda
- Class: Insecta
- Order: Coleoptera
- Suborder: Polyphaga
- Infraorder: Cucujiformia
- Family: Cerambycidae
- Genus: Ectenessa
- Species: E. decorata

Binomial name
- Ectenessa decorata (Melzer, 1935)

Species of beetle

Ectenessa decorata is a species of beetle in the family Cerambycidae. It was described by Melzer in 1935.
