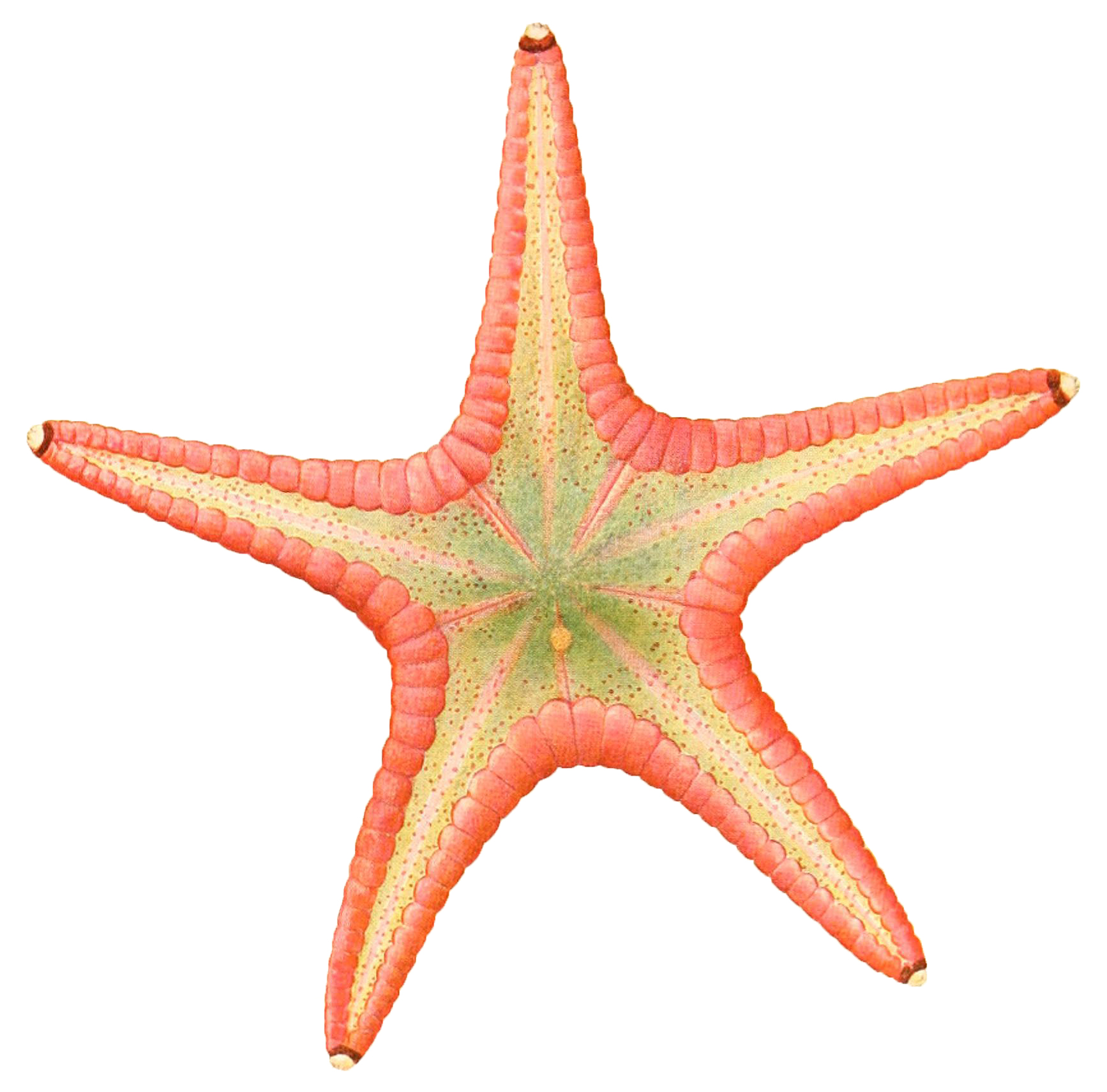

Scientific classification
- Kingdom: Animalia
- Phylum: Echinodermata
- Class: Asteroidea
- Order: Valvatida
- Family: Oreasteridae
- Genus: Goniodiscaster
- Species: G. australiae

Binomial name
- Goniodiscaster australiae Tortonese, 1937

= Goniodiscaster australiae =

Species of starfish

Goniodiscaster australiae is a species of sea stars in the family Oreasteridae.
