= Bomarion =

Scientific classification
- Domain: Eukaryota
- Kingdom: Animalia
- Phylum: Arthropoda
- Class: Insecta
- Order: Coleoptera
- Suborder: Polyphaga
- Infraorder: Cucujiformia
- Family: Cerambycidae
- Tribe: Ectenessini
- Genus: Bomarion

Genus of beetles

Bomarion is a genus of beetles in the family Cerambycidae, containing the following species:

- Bomarion achrostum Napp & Martins, 1982
- Bomarion affabile Napp & Martins, 1982
- Bomarion amborense Galileo & Martins, 2008
- Bomarion anormale (Thomson, 1867)
- Bomarion aureolatum Martins, 1968
- Bomarion boavidai Martins, 1968
- Bomarion carenatum Martins, 1962
- Bomarion fraternum Napp & Martins, 1982
- Bomarion heteroclitum (Thomson, 1867)
- Bomarion lineatum Gounelle, 1909
- Bomarion signatipenne Gounelle, 1909
