= Niophis antennata =

Scientific classification
- Domain: Eukaryota
- Kingdom: Animalia
- Phylum: Arthropoda
- Class: Insecta
- Order: Coleoptera
- Suborder: Polyphaga
- Infraorder: Cucujiformia
- Family: Cerambycidae
- Genus: Niophis
- Species: N. antennata

Binomial name
- Niophis antennata (Martins, Chemsak & Linsley, 1966)

Species of beetle in the family Cerambycidae

Niophis antennata is a species of beetle in the family Cerambycidae. It was described by Martins, Chemsak and Linsley in 1966.
