= Ectenessa andrei =

Scientific classification
- Domain: Eukaryota
- Kingdom: Animalia
- Phylum: Arthropoda
- Class: Insecta
- Order: Coleoptera
- Suborder: Polyphaga
- Infraorder: Cucujiformia
- Family: Cerambycidae
- Genus: Ectenessa
- Species: E. andrei

Binomial name
- Ectenessa andrei Martins & Galileo, 1996

Species of beetle

Ectenessa andrei is a species of beetle in the family Cerambycidae. It was described by Martins and Galileo in 1996.
