= Bomarion heteroclitum =

Scientific classification
- Domain: Eukaryota
- Kingdom: Animalia
- Phylum: Arthropoda
- Class: Insecta
- Order: Coleoptera
- Suborder: Polyphaga
- Infraorder: Cucujiformia
- Family: Cerambycidae
- Genus: Bomarion
- Species: B. heteroclitum

Binomial name
- Bomarion heteroclitum (Thomson, 1867)

Species of beetle

Bomarion heteroclitum is a species of beetle in the family Cerambycidae. It was described by Thomson in 1867.
