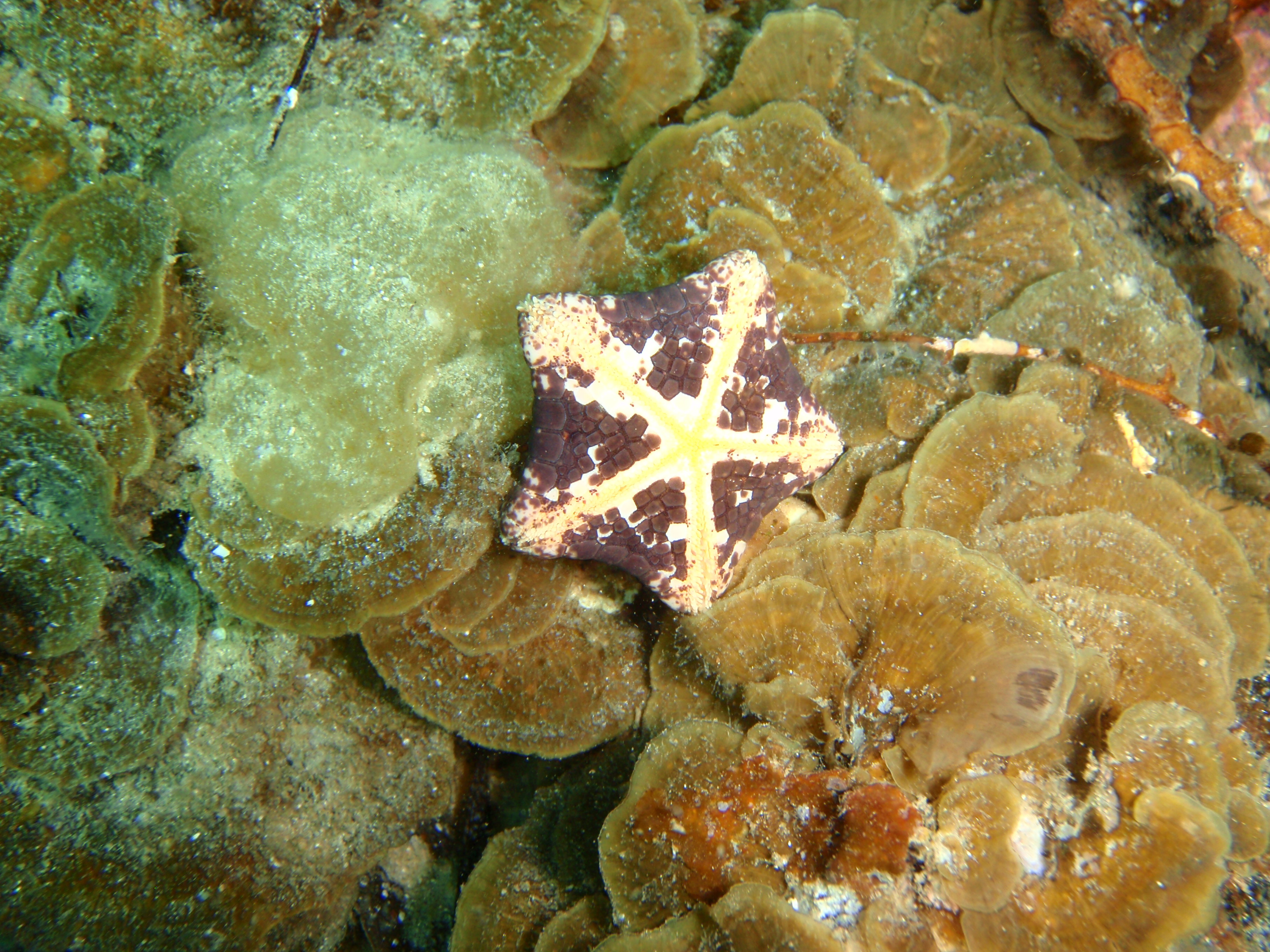

Scientific classification
- Kingdom: Animalia
- Phylum: Echinodermata
- Class: Asteroidea
- Order: Valvatida
- Family: Goniasteridae
- Genus: Tosia
- Species: T. australis

Binomial name
- Tosia australis Gray, 1840

= Tosia australis =

Species of starfish

Tosia australis is a species of starfish belonging to the family Goniasteridae. It is native to Australia, New Zealand, and South Africa.
