= Bomarion boavidai =

Scientific classification
- Domain: Eukaryota
- Kingdom: Animalia
- Phylum: Arthropoda
- Class: Insecta
- Order: Coleoptera
- Suborder: Polyphaga
- Infraorder: Cucujiformia
- Family: Cerambycidae
- Genus: Bomarion
- Species: B. boavidai

Binomial name
- Bomarion boavidai Martins, 1968

Species of beetle

Bomarion boavidai is a species of beetle in the family Cerambycidae. It was described by Martins in 1968.
