= Ectenessa =

Scientific classification
- Kingdom: Animalia
- Phylum: Arthropoda
- Clade: Pancrustacea
- Class: Insecta
- Order: Coleoptera
- Suborder: Polyphaga
- Infraorder: Cucujiformia
- Family: Cerambycidae
- Tribe: Ectenessini
- Genus: Ectenessa; Bates, 1885

Genus of beetles

Ectenessa is a genus of beetles in the family Cerambycidae, containing the following species:

- Ectenessa affinis Martins, Galileo & Oliveira, 2011
- Ectenessa andrei Martins & Galileo, 1996
- Ectenessa angusticollis (Buquet, 1860)
- Ectenessa argodi Belon, 1902
- Ectenessa aurantiaca Martins, Galileo & Santos-Silva, 2015
- Ectenessa caputnigra Nascimento & Botero, 2018
- Ectenessa decorata (Melzer, 1935)
- Ectenessa fenestrata (Gounelle, 1909)
- Ectenessa guttigera (Lucas, 1857)
- Ectenessa gymnopennis Dalens & Giuglaris, 2013
- Ectenessa lurida Martins, 1973
- Ectenessa melanicornis Napp & Martins, 1982
- Ectenessa monnei Da Silva, Monne, Santos-Silva & Rafael, 2026
- Ectenessa nitida Bates, 1885
- Ectenessa ocellata (Gounelle, 1909)
- Ectenessa ornatipennis Tippmann, 1960
- Ectenessa quadriguttata (Burmeister, 1865)
- Ectenessa scansor (Gounelle, 1909)
- Ectenessa spinipennis (Buquet, 1860)
- Ectenessa villardi Belon, 1902
- Ectenessa wappesi Santos-Silva & Galileo, 2016
- Ectenessa zamalloae Galileo & Martins, 2008
