= Ectenessa scansor =

Scientific classification
- Domain: Eukaryota
- Kingdom: Animalia
- Phylum: Arthropoda
- Class: Insecta
- Order: Coleoptera
- Suborder: Polyphaga
- Infraorder: Cucujiformia
- Family: Cerambycidae
- Genus: Ectenessa
- Species: E. scansor

Binomial name
- Ectenessa scansor (Gounelle, 1909)

Species of beetle

Ectenessa scansor is a species of beetle in the family Cerambycidae. It was described by Gounelle in 1909.
