= Ectenessidia metallica =

Scientific classification
- Domain: Eukaryota
- Kingdom: Animalia
- Phylum: Arthropoda
- Class: Insecta
- Order: Coleoptera
- Suborder: Polyphaga
- Infraorder: Cucujiformia
- Family: Cerambycidae
- Genus: Ectenessidia
- Species: E. metallica

Binomial name
- Ectenessidia metallica Napp & Martins, 2006

Species of beetle

Ectenessidia metallica is a type of beetle in the family Cerambycidae. It was described by Napp and Martins in 2006.
