= Ectenessa villardi =

Scientific classification
- Domain: Eukaryota
- Kingdom: Animalia
- Phylum: Arthropoda
- Class: Insecta
- Order: Coleoptera
- Suborder: Polyphaga
- Infraorder: Cucujiformia
- Family: Cerambycidae
- Genus: Ectenessa
- Species: E. villardi

Binomial name
- Ectenessa villardi Belon, 1902

Species of beetle

Ectenessa villardi is a species of beetle in the family Cerambycidae. It was described by Belon in 1902.
