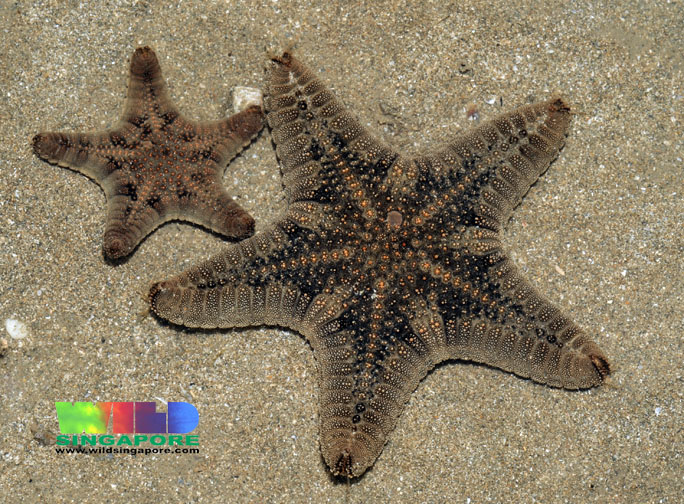

Scientific classification
- Domain: Eukaryota
- Kingdom: Animalia
- Phylum: Echinodermata
- Class: Asteroidea
- Order: Valvatida
- Family: Oreasteridae
- Genus: Goniodiscaster
- Species: G. scaber

Binomial name
- Goniodiscaster scaber (Moebius, 1859)

= Goniodiscaster scaber =

Species of starfish

Goniodiscaster scaber is a species of sea stars in the family Oreasteridae. Its scientific name was first published in 1859 by Karl August Möbius, who placed it in the genus Goniodiscus (now Culcita).
