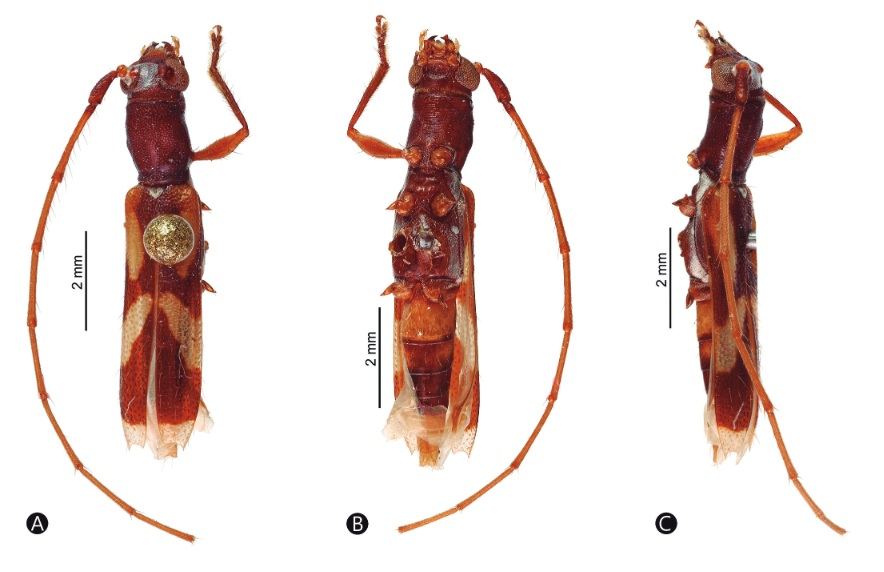

Scientific classification
- Kingdom: Animalia
- Phylum: Arthropoda
- Clade: Pancrustacea
- Class: Insecta
- Order: Coleoptera
- Suborder: Polyphaga
- Infraorder: Cucujiformia
- Family: Cerambycidae
- Genus: Bomarion
- Species: B. anormale

Binomial name
- Bomarion anormale (Thomson, 1867)

= Bomarion anormale =

Species of beetle

Bomarion anormale is a species of beetle in the family Cerambycidae. It was described by Thomson in 1867.
