= Niophis =

Scientific classification
- Domain: Eukaryota
- Kingdom: Animalia
- Phylum: Arthropoda
- Class: Insecta
- Order: Coleoptera
- Suborder: Polyphaga
- Infraorder: Cucujiformia
- Family: Cerambycidae
- Tribe: Ectenessini
- Genus: Niophis

Genus of beetles

Niophis is a genus of beetles in the family Cerambycidae, containing the following species:

- Niophis antennata (Martins, Chemsak & Linsley, 1966)
- Niophis aper (Germar, 1824)
- Niophis bucki Martins & Monné, 1973
- Niophis coptorhina Bates, 1867
- Niophis neotropica (Martins, 1961)
- Niophis picticornis (Martins, 1964)
- Niophis rufula (Gounelle, 1909)
