= Tricheurymerus =

Scientific classification
- Domain: Eukaryota
- Kingdom: Animalia
- Phylum: Arthropoda
- Class: Insecta
- Order: Coleoptera
- Suborder: Polyphaga
- Infraorder: Cucujiformia
- Family: Cerambycidae
- Tribe: Ectenessini
- Genus: Tricheurymerus

Genus of beetles

Tricheurymerus is a genus of beetles in the family Cerambycidae, containing the following species:

- Tricheurymerus obscurus (Prosen, 1947)
- Tricheurymerus quadristigma (Gounelle, 1909)
