= Tricheurymerus quadristigma =

Scientific classification
- Domain: Eukaryota
- Kingdom: Animalia
- Phylum: Arthropoda
- Class: Insecta
- Order: Coleoptera
- Suborder: Polyphaga
- Infraorder: Cucujiformia
- Family: Cerambycidae
- Genus: Tricheurymerus
- Species: T. quadristigma

Binomial name
- Tricheurymerus quadristigma (Gounelle, 1909)

Species of beetle

Tricheurymerus quadristigma is a species of beetle in the family Cerambycidae. It was described by Gounelle in 1909.
