= Ectenessa lurida =

Scientific classification
- Domain: Eukaryota
- Kingdom: Animalia
- Phylum: Arthropoda
- Class: Insecta
- Order: Coleoptera
- Suborder: Polyphaga
- Infraorder: Cucujiformia
- Family: Cerambycidae
- Genus: Ectenessa
- Species: E. lurida

Binomial name
- Ectenessa lurida Martins, 1973

Species of beetle

Ectenessa lurida is a species of beetle in the family Cerambycidae. It was described by Martins in 1973.
