= Lissoeme testacea =

Scientific classification
- Domain: Eukaryota
- Kingdom: Animalia
- Phylum: Arthropoda
- Class: Insecta
- Order: Coleoptera
- Suborder: Polyphaga
- Infraorder: Cucujiformia
- Family: Cerambycidae
- Genus: Lissoeme
- Species: L. testacea

Binomial name
- Lissoeme testacea Martins Chemsak & Linsley, 1966

Species of beetle

Lissoeme testacea is a species of beetle in the family Cerambycidae. It was described by Martins Chemsak and Linsley in 1966.
