= Goniodiscaster forficulatus =

Scientific classification
- Kingdom: Animalia
- Phylum: Echinodermata
- Class: Asteroidea
- Order: Valvatida
- Family: Oreasteridae
- Genus: Goniodiscaster
- Species: G. forficulatus

Binomial name
- Goniodiscaster forficulatus (Perrier, 1875)

Species of starfish

Goniodiscaster forficulatus is a species of sea stars in the family Oreasteridae.
