= Ectenessa ornatipennis =

Scientific classification
- Domain: Eukaryota
- Kingdom: Animalia
- Phylum: Arthropoda
- Class: Insecta
- Order: Coleoptera
- Suborder: Polyphaga
- Infraorder: Cucujiformia
- Family: Cerambycidae
- Genus: Ectenessa
- Species: E. ornatipennis

Binomial name
- Ectenessa ornatipennis Tippmann, 1960

Species of beetle

Ectenessa ornatipennis is a species of beetle in the family Cerambycidae. It was described by Tippmann in 1960.
