= Niophis coptorhina =

Scientific classification
- Domain: Eukaryota
- Kingdom: Animalia
- Phylum: Arthropoda
- Class: Insecta
- Order: Coleoptera
- Suborder: Polyphaga
- Infraorder: Cucujiformia
- Family: Cerambycidae
- Genus: Niophis
- Species: N. coptorhina

Binomial name
- Niophis coptorhina Bates, 1867

Species of beetle

Niophis coptorhina is a species of beetle in the family Cerambycidae. It was described by Henry Walter Bates in 1867.
