= Ectenessa zamalloae =

Scientific classification
- Domain: Eukaryota
- Kingdom: Animalia
- Phylum: Arthropoda
- Class: Insecta
- Order: Coleoptera
- Suborder: Polyphaga
- Infraorder: Cucujiformia
- Family: Cerambycidae
- Genus: Ectenessa
- Species: E. zamalloae

Binomial name
- Ectenessa zamalloae Galileo & Martins, 2008

Species of beetle

Ectenessa zamalloae is a species of beetle in the family Cerambycidae. It was described by Galileo and Martins in 2008.
