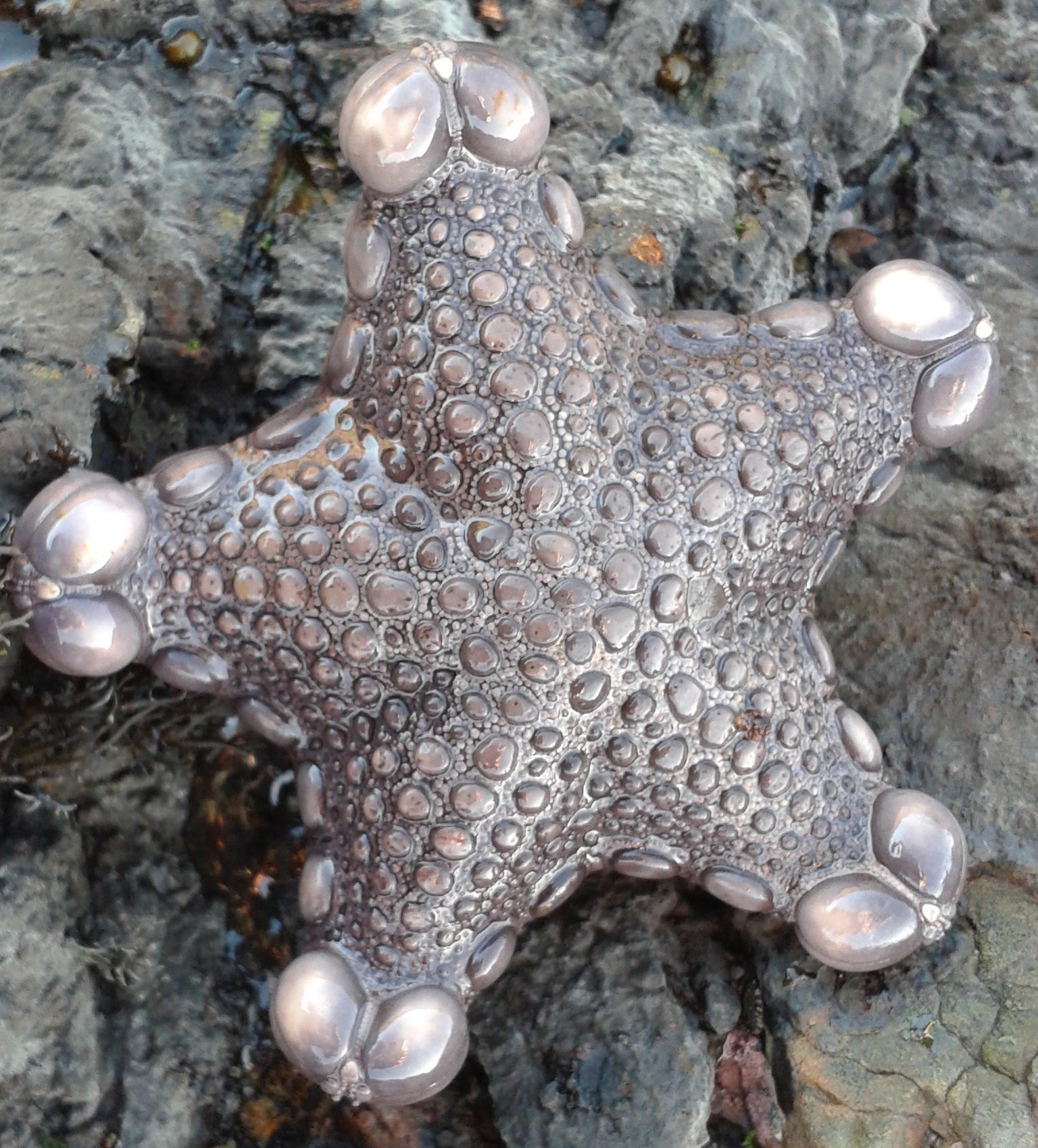

Scientific classification
- Kingdom: Animalia
- Phylum: Echinodermata
- Class: Asteroidea
- Order: Valvatida
- Family: Goniasteridae
- Genus: Pentagonaster
- Species: P. pulchellus

Binomial name
- Pentagonaster pulchellus Gray, 1840

= Pentagonaster pulchellus =

Species of starfish

Pentagonaster pulchellus, commonly known as the biscuit star or sometimes the jewelled star, is a species of starfish endemic to New Zealand, where it is common in Cook Strait and around the coasts of the South Island. It has also been recorded from the Chatham Islands and in the Campbell Plateau down to the Snares Islands.

== Description and habitat ==
The dorsal surface of the biscuit star is studded with hard smooth plates, which enlarge along the margins and at the ends of the five arms into convex, oval-shaped shields. It is one of the most colourful sea stars in NZ, appearing in red, orange, brown, or a silvery purple. The ventral side is a patterned mesh of white over light grey, with yellow tube feet. P. pulchellus frequents seaweed beds, rocky and muddy bottoms from low intertidal down to 300m.
