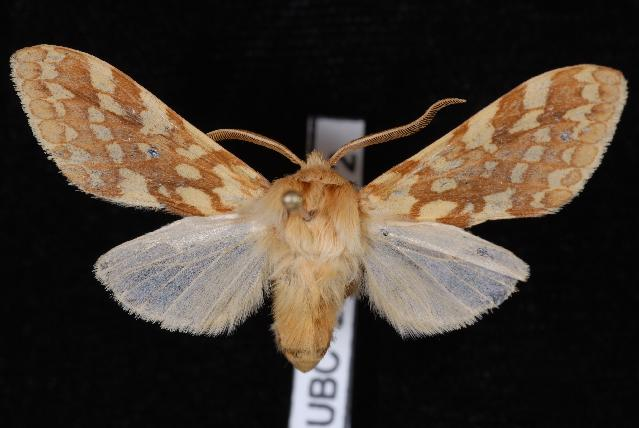

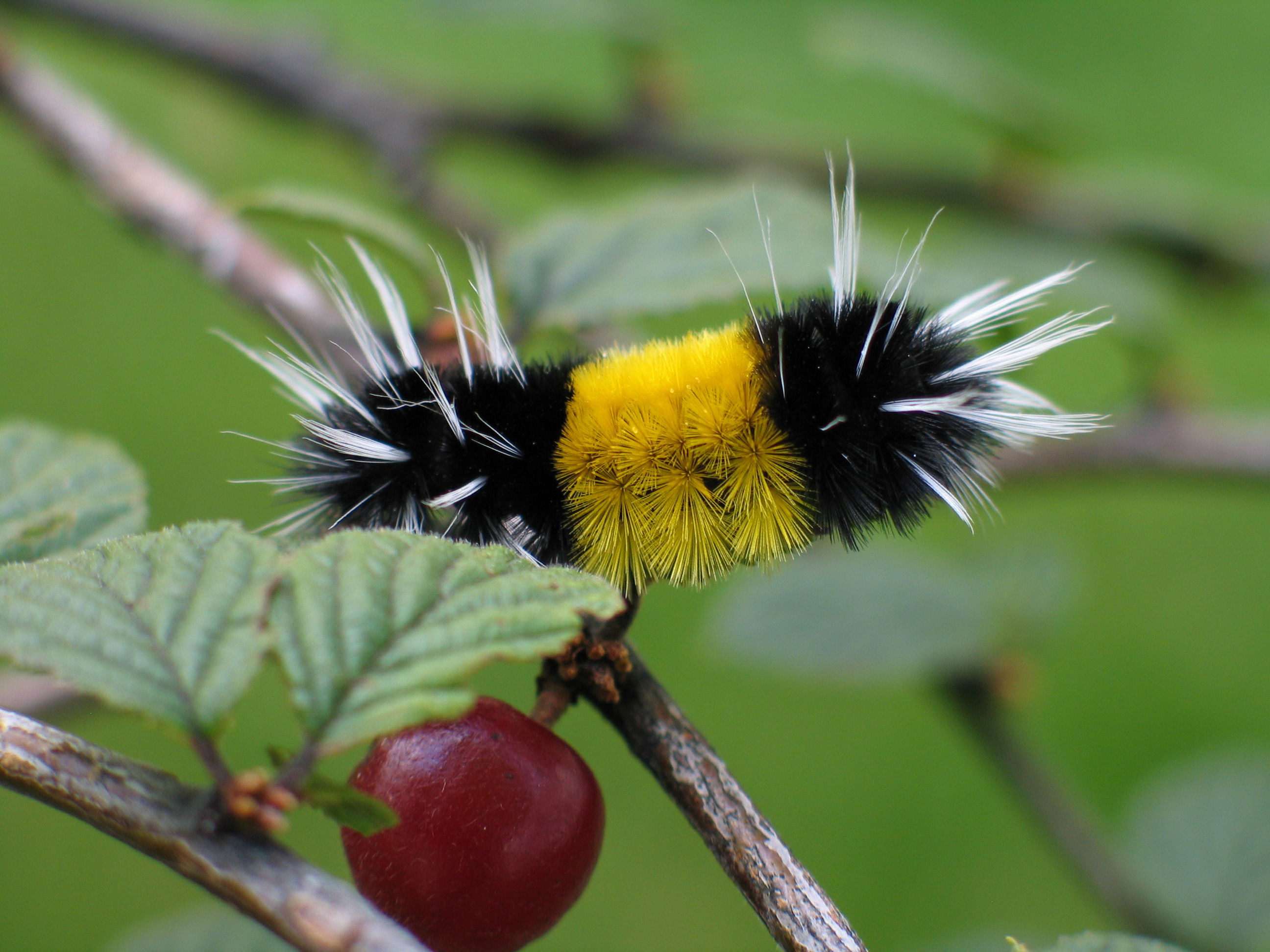

Scientific classification
- Kingdom: Animalia
- Phylum: Arthropoda
- Clade: Pancrustacea
- Class: Insecta
- Order: Lepidoptera
- Superfamily: Noctuoidea
- Family: Erebidae
- Subfamily: Arctiinae
- Genus: Lophocampa
- Species: L. maculata

Binomial name
- Lophocampa maculata Harris, 1841

Synonyms
- Halisidota maculata; Halesidota fulvoflava Walker, 1855; Phegoptera guttifera Herrich-Schäffer, [1855]; Halysidota agassizi Packard, 1864; Halysidota californica Walker, [1865]; Halesidota angulifera Walker, 1866; Phoegoptera salicis Boisduval, 1869; Halysidota agassizii var. alni H. Edwards, 1877; Halysidota maculata var. eureka Dyar, 1904; Halisidota maculata texana Rothschild, 1909

= Lophocampa maculata =

Species of moth

Lophocampa maculata, the Yellow-spotted tussock moth, mottled tiger or spotted halisidota, is a moth of the family Erebidae and the tribe Arctiini, the tiger moths. The species was first described by Thaddeus William Harris in 1841. It is found across Canada, the western parts of the United States, south in the Appalachians to South Carolina and Kentucky. They are also found in Southeastern Alaska.

The wingspan is 35–45 mm. The moth flies from May to July; the larvae remain from July to September. There is one generation per year. The larvae go through five instars. In some populations the caterpillar can vary greatly in color between instars. One variation is white with a line of orange dorsal spots, Another variation is yellow with black at the tail and head. The final instar is black at the ends, with a yellow or orange middle section, which in some populations has black spots.

The larvae feed on the leaves of some poplars, willows, alders, basswoods, birches, maples, and oaks.

It is a tiger moth but is commonly referred to as a "tussock moth" for the tufts of hair on the caterpillar. According to Wiktionary, a tussock is a tuft or clump of green grass or similar verdure, forming a small hillock.

Lophocampa maculata mid instar

L. maculata last instar

== Subspecies ==
- Lophocampa maculata maculata
- Lophocampa maculata agassizii (Packard, 1864) (California, British Columbia)
- Lophocampa maculata texana (Rothschild, 1909) (Texas)
