= Breynia desorii =

Scientific classification
- Kingdom: Animalia
- Phylum: Echinodermata
- Class: Echinoidea
- Order: Spatangoida
- Family: Loveniidae
- Genus: Breynia
- Species: B. desorii

Binomial name
- Breynia desorii Gray, 1851

Species of sea urchin

Breynia desorii is a species of sea urchins of the family Loveniidae. Their armour is covered with spines. Breynia desorii was first scientifically described in 1851 by Gray.
