= Ectenesseca =

Scientific classification
- Domain: Eukaryota
- Kingdom: Animalia
- Phylum: Arthropoda
- Class: Insecta
- Order: Coleoptera
- Suborder: Polyphaga
- Infraorder: Cucujiformia
- Family: Cerambycidae
- Genus: Ectenesseca
- Species: E. clavula

Binomial name
- Ectenesseca clavula Martins & Galileo, 2005

Genus of beetles

Ectenesseca clavula is a species of beetle in the family Cerambycidae, the only species in the genus Ectenesseca.
