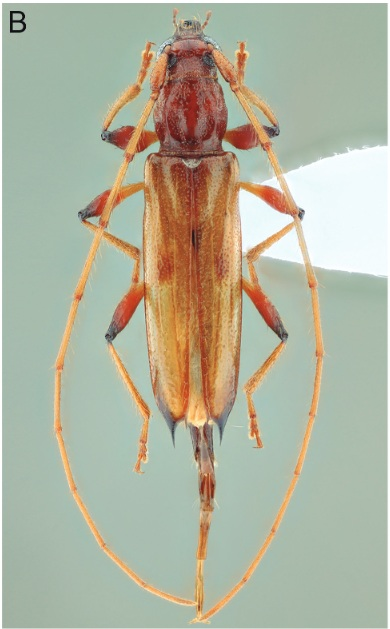

Scientific classification
- Kingdom: Animalia
- Phylum: Arthropoda
- Clade: Pancrustacea
- Class: Insecta
- Order: Coleoptera
- Suborder: Polyphaga
- Infraorder: Cucujiformia
- Family: Cerambycidae
- Genus: Acanthonessa; Napp & Martins, 1982
- Species: A. quadrispinosa

Binomial name
- Acanthonessa quadrispinosa (Melzer, 1931)

Synonyms
- Species synonymy: Ectenessa quadrispinosa Melzer, 1931; Ectenessa (Ectenessa) quadrispinosa Melzer, 1931; Ectnessa quadrispinosa (Melzer, 1931)

= Acanthonessa =

Genus of beetles

Acanthonessa quadrispinosa is a species of beetle in the family Cerambycidae. It is the only species within the genus Acanthonessa. It is found in Brazil and Paraguay.
