= Meryeurus =

Meryeurus servillei

Scientific classification
- Kingdom: Animalia
- Phylum: Arthropoda
- Class: Insecta
- Order: Coleoptera
- Suborder: Polyphaga
- Infraorder: Cucujiformia
- Family: Cerambycidae
- Genus: Meryeurus
- Species: M. servillei

Binomial name
- Meryeurus servillei Martins & Galileo, 1998

Genus of beetles

Meryeurus servillei is a species of beetle in the family Cerambycidae, the only species in the genus Meryeurus.
