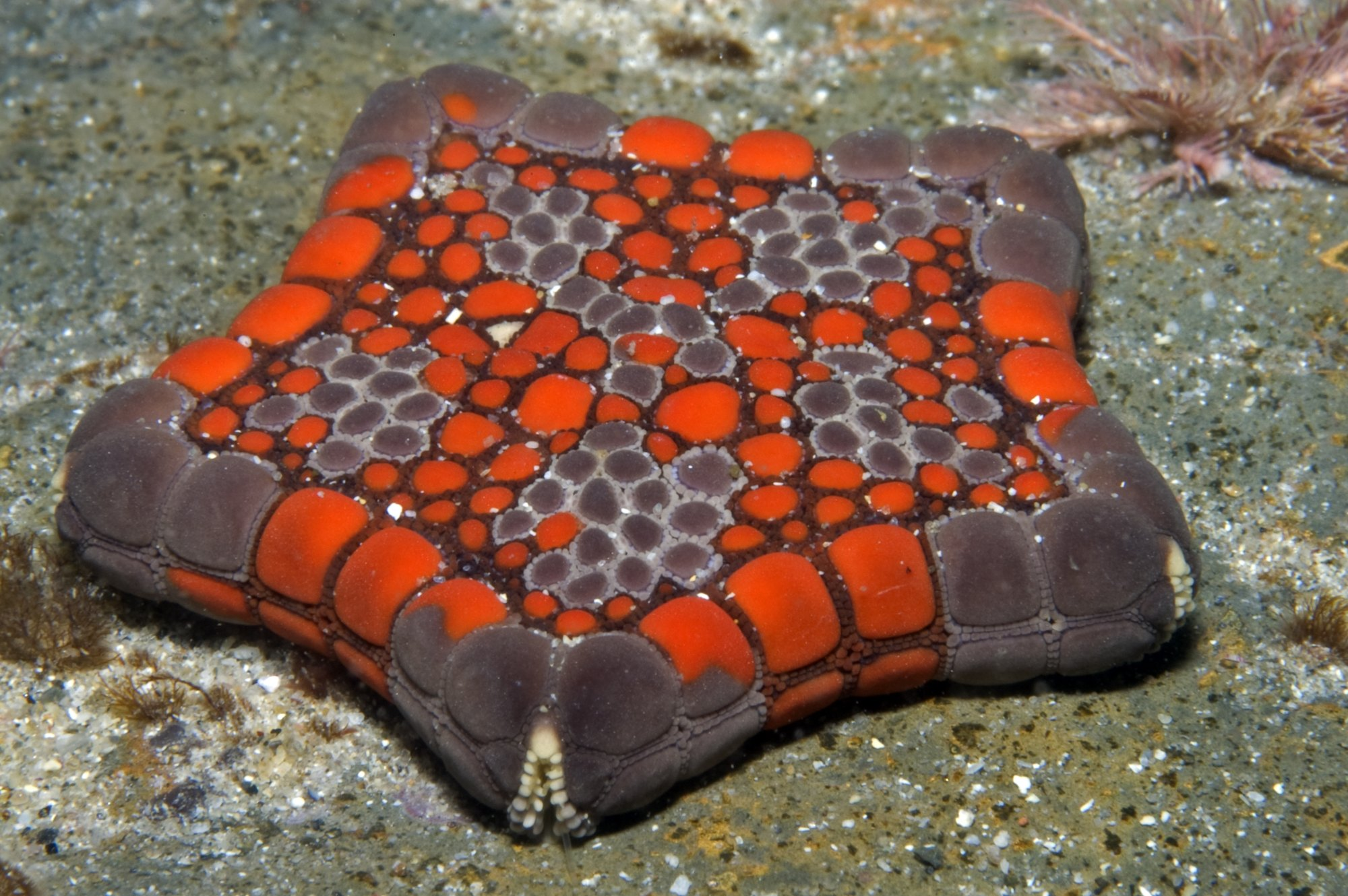
- Tosia neossia

Scientific classification
- Kingdom: Animalia
- Phylum: Echinodermata
- Class: Asteroidea
- Order: Valvatida
- Family: Goniasteridae
- Subfamily: Pentagonasterinae
- Genus: Tosia; Gray, 1840

Species
- See text

= Tosia (echinoderm) =

Genus of starfishes

Tosia is a genus of starfish belonging to the family Goniasteridae. The species of this genus are found in Australia, New Zealand, and South Africa.

== Species ==
The genus includes the following species:

- Tosia australis Gray, 1840
- Tosia magnifica (Muller & Troschel, 1842)
- Tosia neossia Naughton & O'Hara, 2009
