= Cotynessa =

Cotynessa abatinga

Scientific classification
- Kingdom: Animalia
- Phylum: Arthropoda
- Class: Insecta
- Order: Coleoptera
- Suborder: Polyphaga
- Infraorder: Cucujiformia
- Family: Cerambycidae
- Genus: Cotynessa
- Species: C. abatinga

Binomial name
- Cotynessa abatinga Martins & Galileo, 2006

Genus of beetles

Cotynessa abatinga is a species of beetle in the family Cerambycidae, the only species in the genus Cotynessa.
