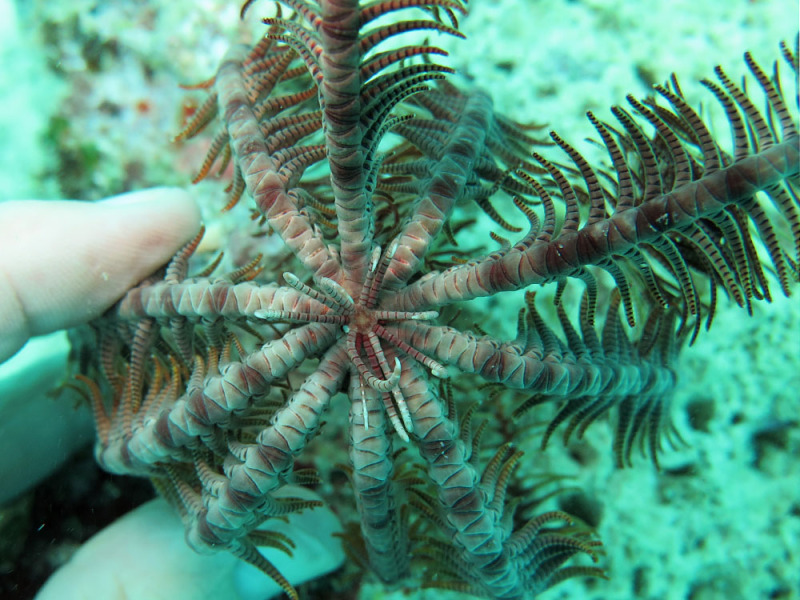

Scientific classification
- Kingdom: Animalia
- Phylum: Echinodermata
- Class: Crinoidea
- Order: Comatulida
- Family: Comatulidae
- Genus: Comatula
- Species: C. solaris

Binomial name
- Comatula solaris Lamarck, 1816

Synonyms
- Actinometra albonotata Bell, 1882; Actinometra imperialis Müller, 1841; Actinometra intermedia Bell, 1884; Actinometra robusta Carpenter, 1879; Actinometra solaris (Lamarck, 1816); Actinometra strota Carpenter, 1884

= Comatula solaris =

Species of feather star

Comatula solaris is a species of feather star in the family Comatulidae and is the type species of the genus Comatula.

== Description ==
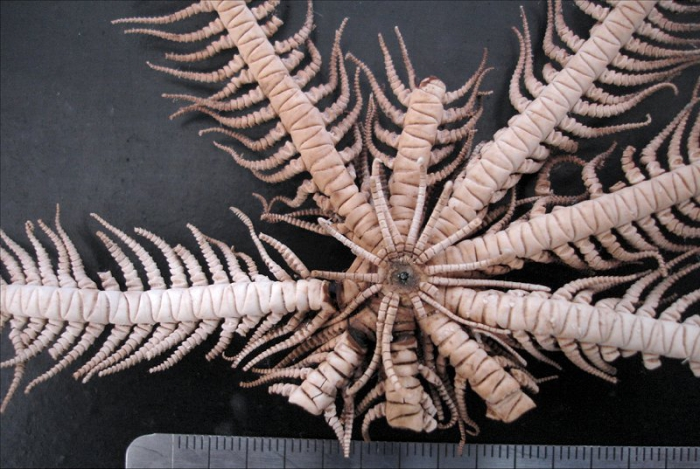
Close-up photo

C. solaris was described by Jean-Baptiste Lamarck in 1816. The generic name means 'having hair neatly curled', referring to the legs of the feather stars. The body contains high levels of magnesium calcite in the skeleton that makes up most of the body mass. The skeleton is composed of ossicles connecting to soft tissue and ligaments. The C. solaris are a species in one of two sister clades. They belong to the ten armed comatula, along with C. pectinata and other Comatula species. The other clade has the twenty arm Comatula, including C. rotalaria. C. solaris resemble flowering plants, with ten stiff arms and a ring of small cirri. Their arms contain hooks, developed on their pinnules, they give them the ability to cling to things. Comatula can also be divided into two categories based on how costals are arranged.

C. solaris is a species in which costals are united by syzygy, or two conjoined protozoa that can exchange genetic material. Their outer radials and first two brachials are also united by syzygy. C. solaris is a stalked crinoid, and are attached to rocks or ocean substrate. Similar species are able to crawl, but this has not been reported in C. solaris. They are predicted to be facultatively mobile, meaning that they should be able to move if necessary.

These stars are suspension feeders, they allow water to filter through them and they feed on the small organisms that they capture. C. solaris are blind. Little research explores their nervous system, leaving uncertainty about their awareness of their surroundings. C. solaris can be compared to C. pectinata as they have almost identical COI sequences.

== Distribution ==
C. solaris are found only in marine environments. They are found most commonly in the oceans of northern Australia, the Philippines, Singapore, and east India. The most prevalent research took place around Lizard Island and the Great Barrier Reef in Australia. They are primarily found in exposed sandy sediment, and some have been found under rubble in sediment environments. They most commonly live in areas where the sea surface temperature is 20–30 °C (68–86 °F) and the surface salinity is between 30 and 35 PSU. C. solaris are typically found in shallow water at depths of 10–20 m (33–66 ft), but have been found at depths of up to 500 m (1,600 ft).
