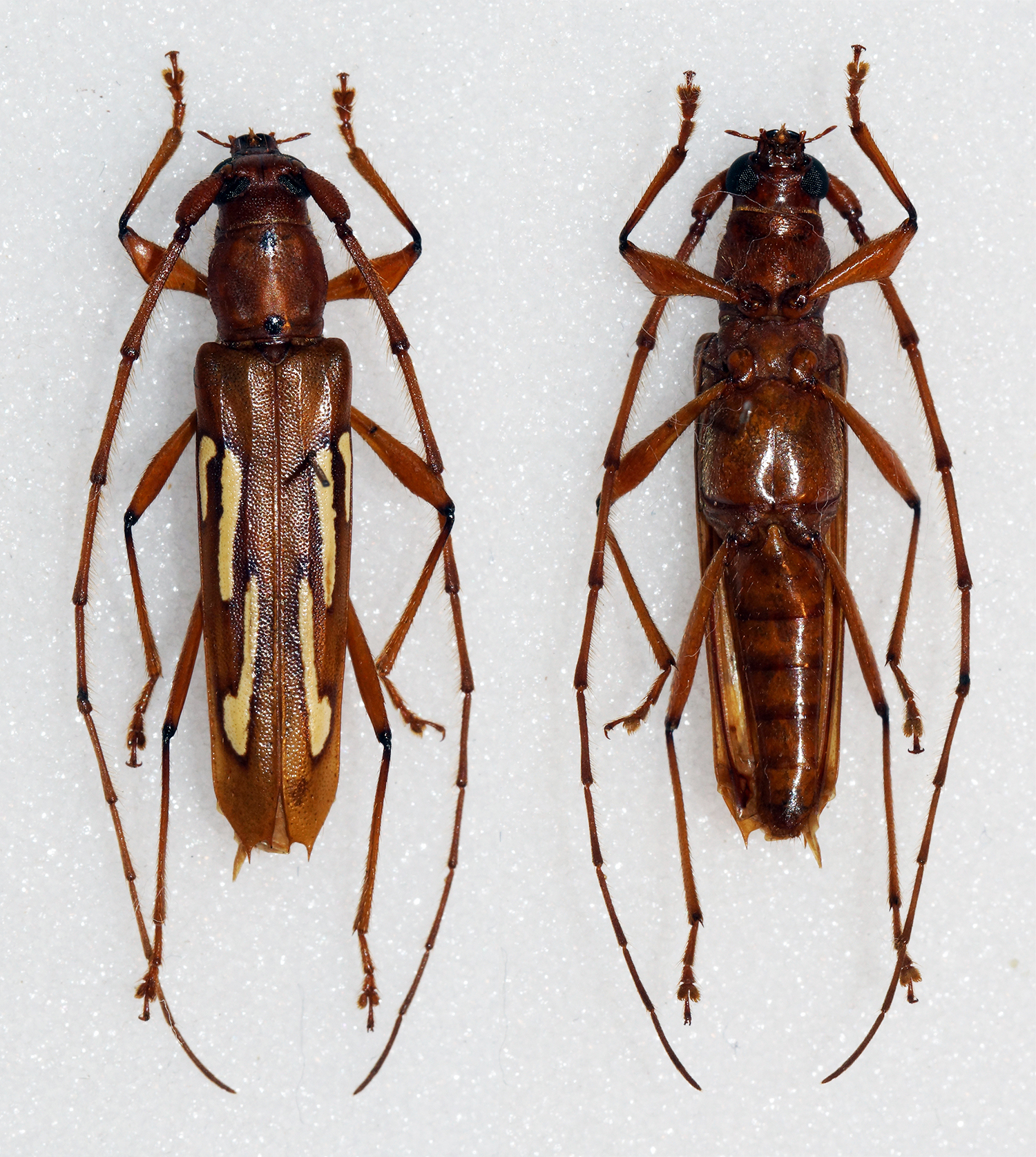

Scientific classification
- Kingdom: Animalia
- Phylum: Arthropoda
- Clade: Pancrustacea
- Class: Insecta
- Order: Coleoptera
- Suborder: Polyphaga
- Infraorder: Cucujiformia
- Family: Cerambycidae
- Genus: Eurymerus
- Species: E. eburioides

Binomial name
- Eurymerus eburioides Audinet-Serville, 1833

= Eurymerus =

Eurymerus eburioides

Genus of beetles

Eurymerus eburioides is a species of beetle in the family Cerambycidae, the only species in the genus Eurymerus.
