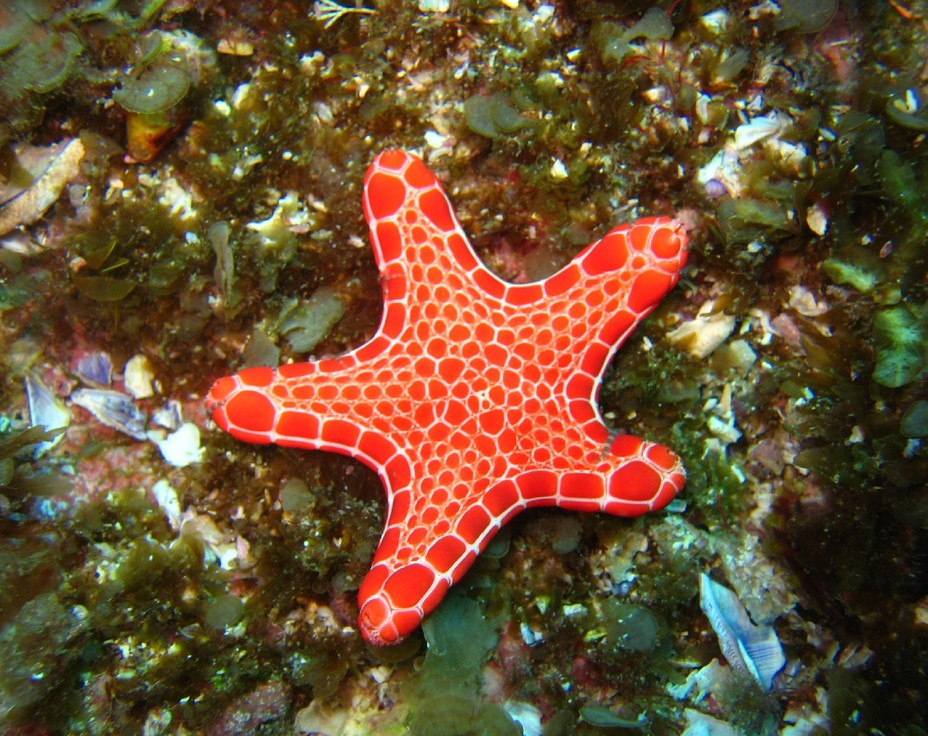

Scientific classification
- Kingdom: Animalia
- Phylum: Echinodermata
- Class: Asteroidea
- Order: Valvatida
- Family: Goniasteridae
- Genus: Pentagonaster
- Species: P. duebeni

Binomial name
- Pentagonaster duebeni Gray, 1847

Synonyms
- Astrogonium crassimanum Möbius, 1859; Astrogonium duebeni (Gray, 1847); Astrogonium gunni Sladen, 1889; Goniaster duebeni (Gray, 1847); Pentagonaster crassimanus (Möbius, 1859); Pentagonaster gunni Perrier, 1875; Stephanaster duebeni (Gray, 1847); Stephanaster gunni (Sladen, 1889)

= Pentagonaster duebeni =

Species of starfish

Pentagonaster duebeni is a species of starfish within the family Goniasteridae.

== Distribution & habitat ==
Pentagonaster duebeni is distributed off the Australian coasts from Shark Bay to Tasmania and southern Queensland. Its preferred habitat is exposed and sheltered reefs at depths up to 160 meters below sea level.

== Description & feeding ==
Pentagonaster duebeni is a 5 armed flattened starfish with blunted arms separated by rounded arcs. Surface is layered with polygonal plates colored red and orange separated with yellow-white incisions. Arms are equal in length to the central disc, reaching a lengths up to 8 centimeters. Sizes reach up to 8 centimeters in width. P. duebeni diet consists of sponges, bryozoans, and other invertebrates.

Specimens from southern Western Australian show colors in various shades of dark to light red plates with raised dorsal plates. Sizes have been recorded at over 11 centimeters in width with slightly longer arm lengths.
