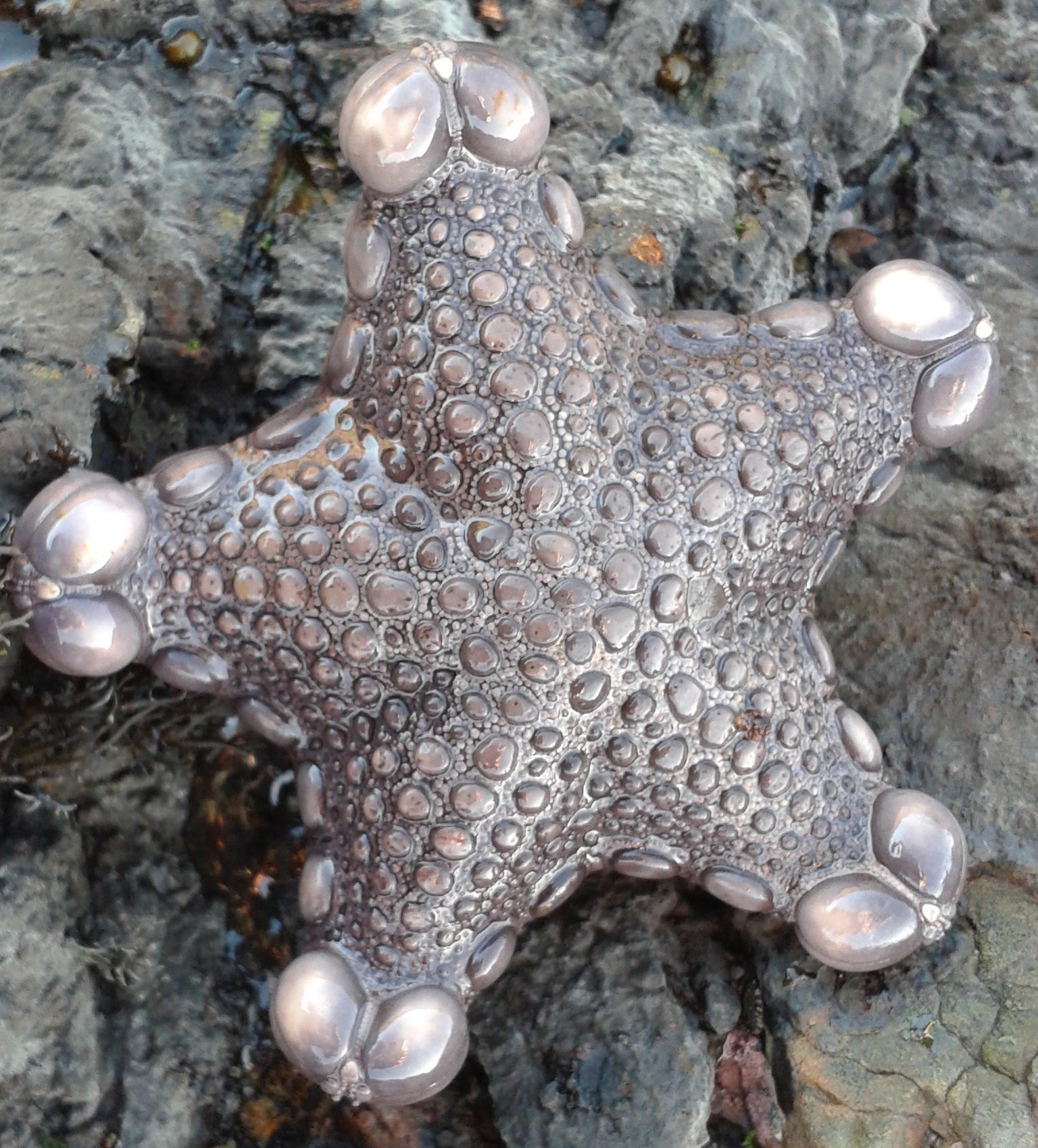
- Pentagonaster pulchellus

Scientific classification
- Kingdom: Animalia
- Phylum: Echinodermata
- Class: Asteroidea
- Order: Valvatida
- Family: Goniasteridae
- Subfamily: Pentagonasterinae
- Genus: Pentagonaster; Gray, 1840

= Pentagonaster (echinoderm) =

Genus of starfishes

Pentagonaster is a genus of sea stars in the family Goniasteridae.

== Species list ==
Many species previously in the genus have been assigned to other genera in the subfamily, some also have been absorbed into the following species:

Image	Scientific name	Distribution
	Pentagonaster duebeni Gray, 1847	Australia
	Pentagonaster elegans Blake in Blake & Zinsmeister, 1988	
	Pentagonaster gibbosus Perrier, 1875	Australia
	Pentagonaster pulchellus Gray, 1840	New Zealand
	Pentagonaster stibarus H.L. Clark, 1914	Australia
