= Paralissoeme =

Scientific classification
- Domain: Eukaryota
- Kingdom: Animalia
- Phylum: Arthropoda
- Class: Insecta
- Order: Coleoptera
- Suborder: Polyphaga
- Infraorder: Cucujiformia
- Family: Cerambycidae
- Genus: Paralissoeme
- Species: P. maculipennis

Binomial name
- Paralissoeme maculipennis Dalens & Touroult, 2010

Genus of beetles

Paralissoeme maculipennis is a species of beetle in the family Cerambycidae, the only species in the genus Paralissoeme.
