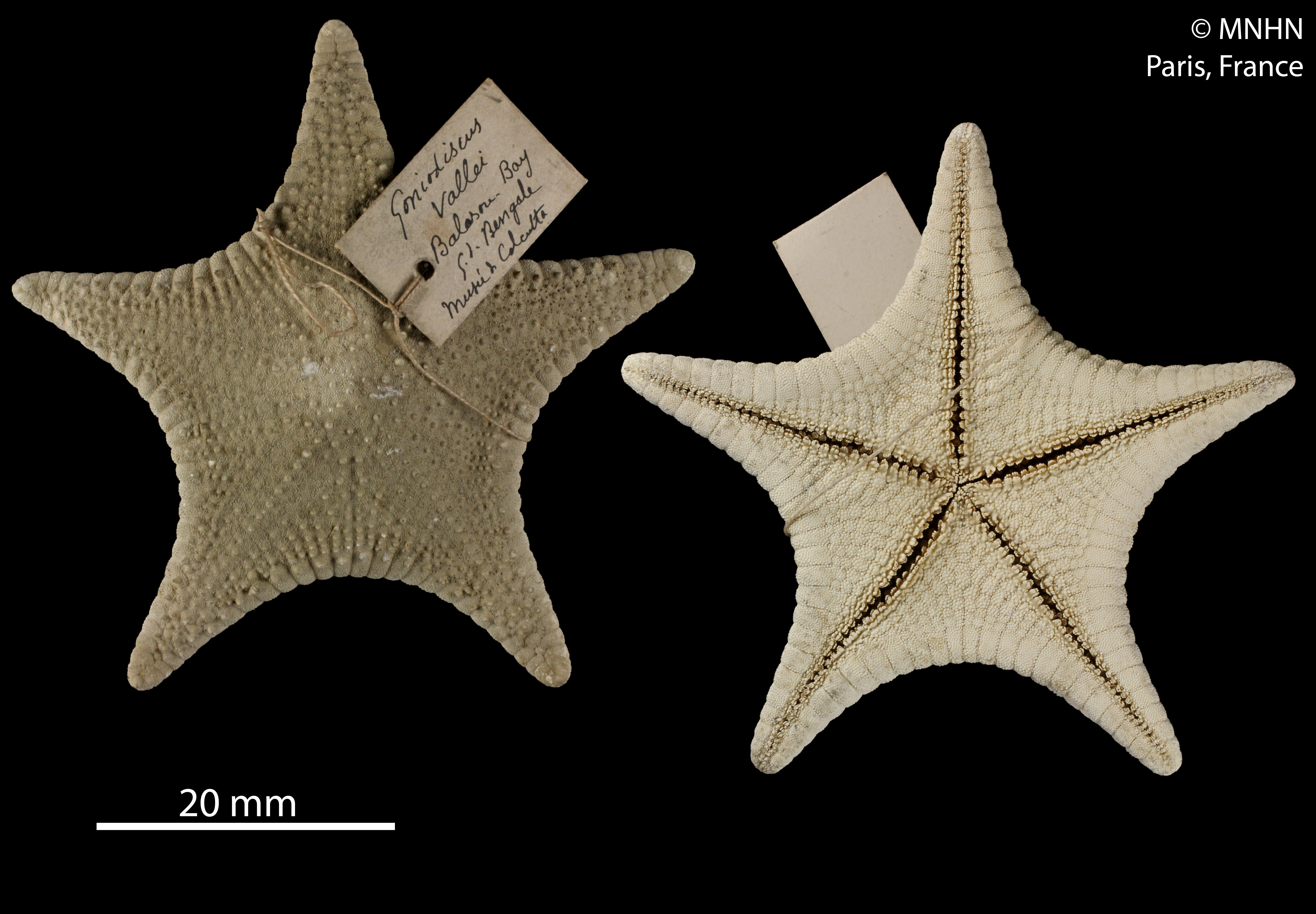

Scientific classification
- Kingdom: Animalia
- Phylum: Echinodermata
- Class: Asteroidea
- Order: Valvatida
- Family: Oreasteridae
- Genus: Goniodiscaster
- Species: G. seriatus

Binomial name
- Goniodiscaster seriatus (Muller & Troschel, 1843)

= Goniodiscaster seriatus =

Species of starfish

Goniodiscaster seriatus is a species of sea stars in the family Oreasteridae.
