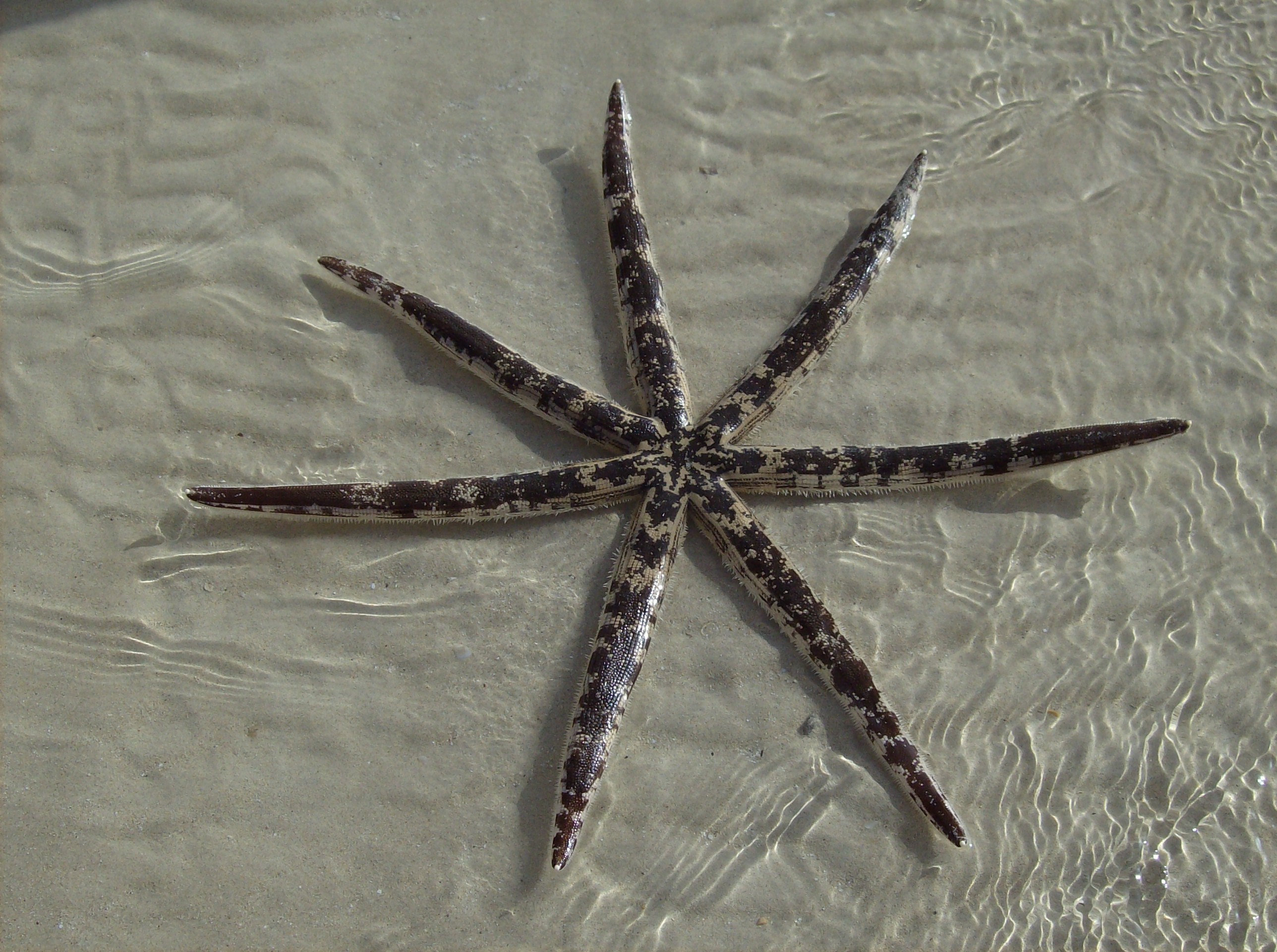

Scientific classification
- Domain: Eukaryota
- Kingdom: Animalia
- Phylum: Echinodermata
- Class: Asteroidea
- Order: Paxillosida
- Family: Luidiidae
- Genus: Luidia
- Species: L. maculata

Binomial name
- Luidia maculata Müller & Troschel, 1842

Synonyms
- Luidia varia Mortensen, 1925

= Luidia maculata =

Species of starfish

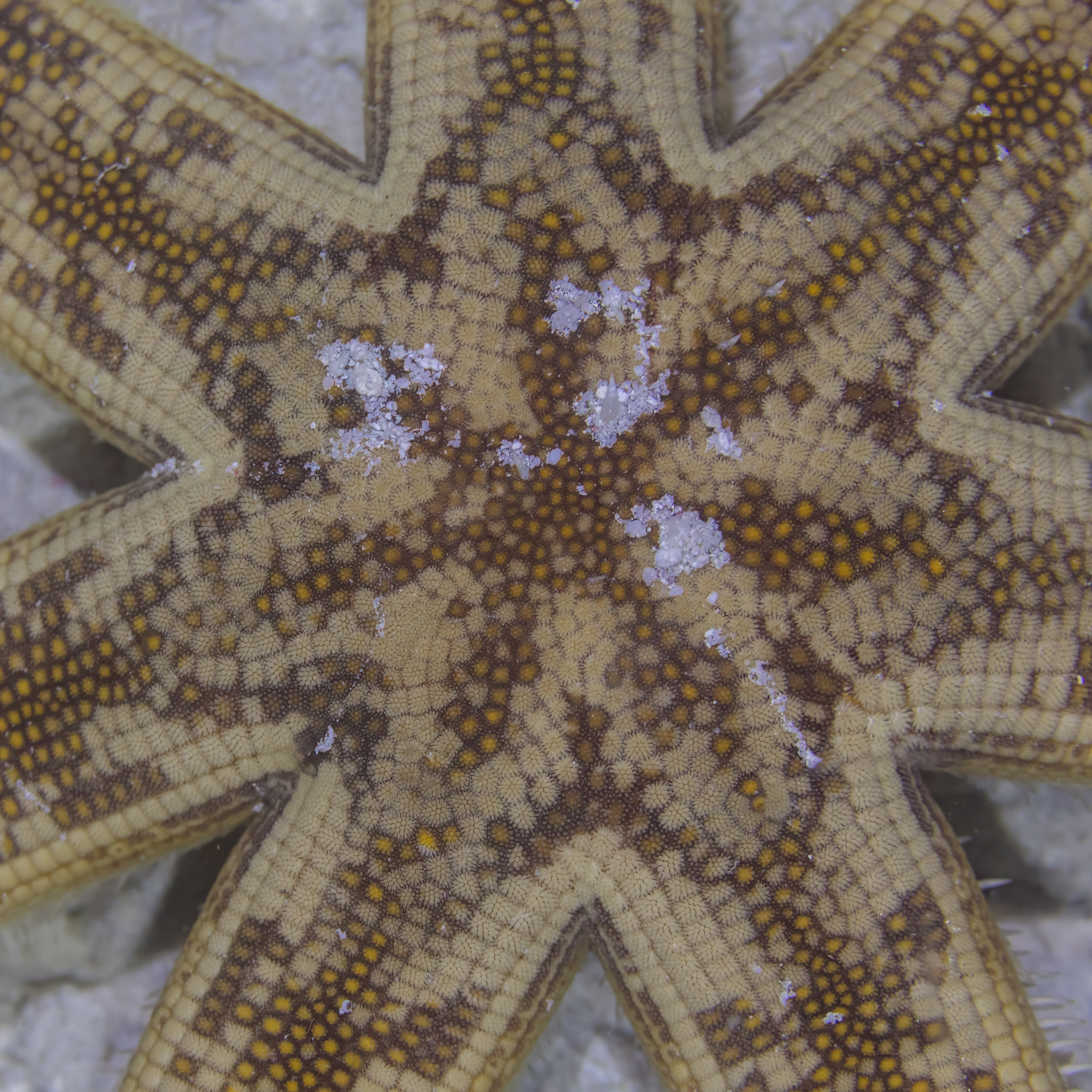
Detail view

Luidia maculata is a species of starfish in the family Luidiidae in the order Paxillosida. It is native to the Indo-Pacific region. It is commonly known as the eight-armed sea star because, although the number of arms varies from five to nine, eight arms seems to be the most common.

== Description ==
Luidia maculata is a large starfish, up to 25 cm (10 in) in diameter. There are usually seven or eight (sometimes nine) long, slender, pointed arms and a relatively small central disc. The aboral (upper) surface is flat, with some granulations, the surface covered with flat-topped, table-like structures known as paxillae. Rows of pale-coloured tube feet that end in points rather than suction pads, are visible on the sides of the arms and the oral (lower) surface. There are two different colour forms of this starfish; some individuals are a uniform shade of dark brown or greenish-brown, while others are dark brown with orange-brown chevron-shaped markings, or light brown with dark markings. This starfish could be confused with some other member of the Luidia genus, particularly L. savignyi, but that species is spiny whereas L. maculata is smooth. Another similar species is L. magnifica, but that typically has nine or ten arms.

== Distribution and habitat ==
Luidia maculata is native to the tropical Indian and Pacific Ocean. Its usual habitat is muddy sand on the floor of lagoons, but it may also be found on other soft sediments and in seagrass beds. Its depth range is from a few metres down to about 35 m (115 ft).

== Ecology ==
Luidia maculata partially buries itself in soft sediment rendering itself difficult to spot. It is a predator, feeding mostly on sea urchins, particularly irregular sand dollars and similar echinoderms which also live buried in sand. Unlike some related species which practice external digestion, it draws its prey inside its mouth to consume. When it emerges from hiding, it often leaves behind inedible fragments of test from its prey in the hollow it vacated. Other dietary items include sea cucumbers, brittle stars, bivalves, snails, crustaceans and worms. Unlike other starfish that practice extra oral digestion Luidia maculata ingests its prey at the oral orifice in the center of the disc, ventral surface, and consumes it inside itself.
