= Bothriaster =

Scientific classification
- Kingdom: Animalia
- Phylum: Echinodermata
- Class: Asteroidea
- Order: Valvatida
- Family: Oreasteridae
- Genus: Bothriaster; Döderlein, 1916
- Species: B. primigenius

Binomial name
- Bothriaster primigenius Döderlein, 1916

Genus of starfishes

Bothriaster primigenius is a species of sea stars in the family Oreasteridae. It is the sole species in the genus Bothriaster.

It is suspected to be only the juvenile stage of some large Oreasteridae such as Choriaster granulatus.
