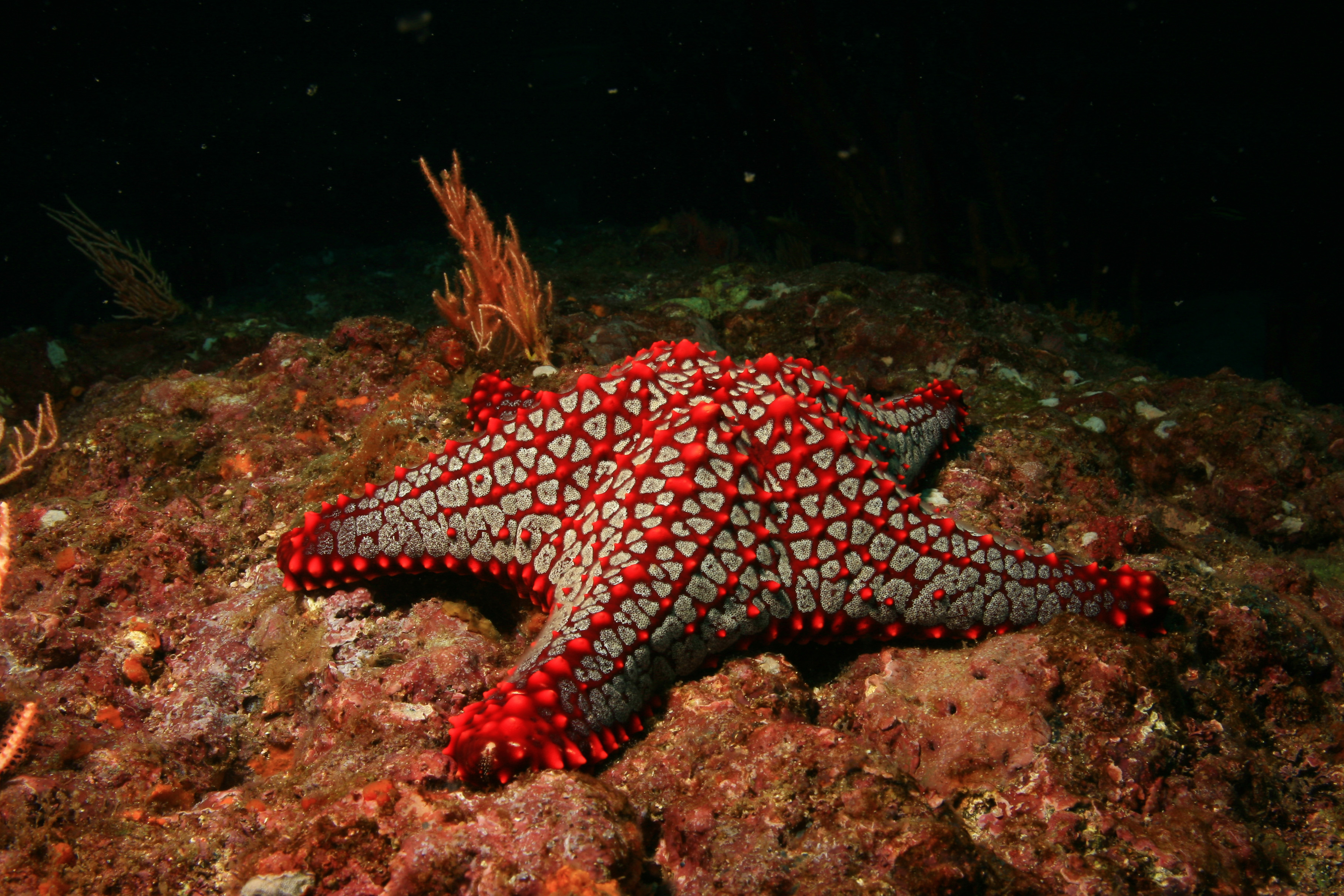
- Pentaceraster cumingi

Scientific classification
- Kingdom: Animalia
- Phylum: Echinodermata
- Class: Asteroidea
- Order: Valvatida
- Family: Oreasteridae
- Genus: Pentaceraster; Döderlein, 1916

Species
- See text

= Pentaceraster =

Genus of starfishes

Pentaceraster is a genus of sea stars in the family Oreasteridae. Members of this genus are most often observed in warm coastal waters of the Pacific and Indian Oceans.

== Selected species ==
List of species according to the World Register of Marine Species:

- Pentaceraster affinis (Müller & Troschel, 1842)
- Pentaceraster alveolatus (Perrier, 1875)
- Pentaceraster chinensis (J.E.Gray, 1840)
- Pentaceraster cumingi (J.E.Gray, 1840)
- Pentaceraster decipiens (Bell, 1884)
- Pentaceraster gracilis (Lütken, 1871)
- Pentaceraster horridus (J.E.Gray, 1840)
- Pentaceraster magnificus (Goto, 1914)
- Pentaceraster mammillatus (Audouin, 1826)
- Pentaceraster multispinus (von Martens, 1866)
- Pentaceraster regulus (Müller & Troschel, 1842)
- Pentaceraster sibogae Döderlein, 1916
- Pentaceraster tuberculatus (Müller & Troschel, 1842)
- Pentaceraster westermanni (Lütken, 1871)
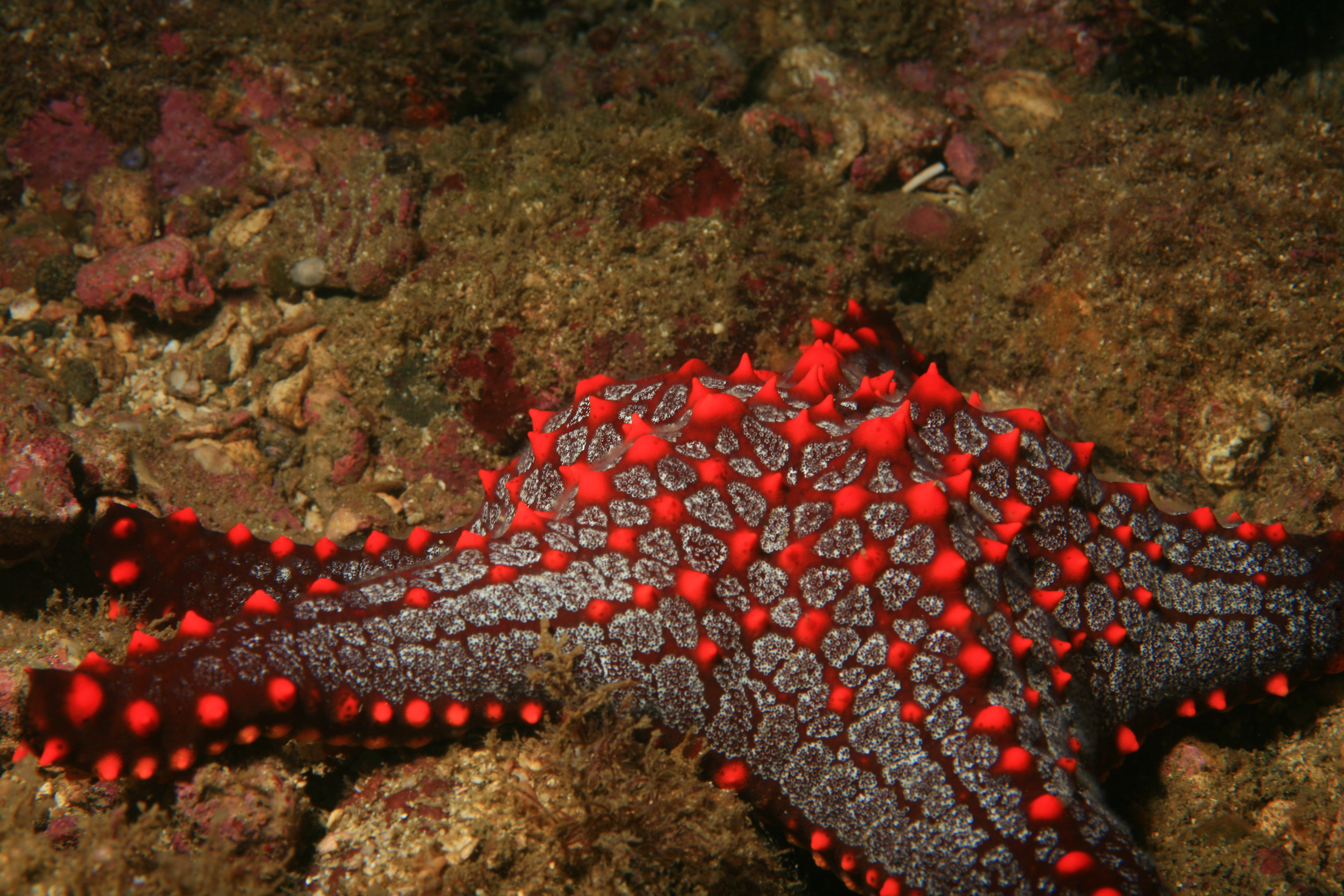
Pentaceraster cumingi

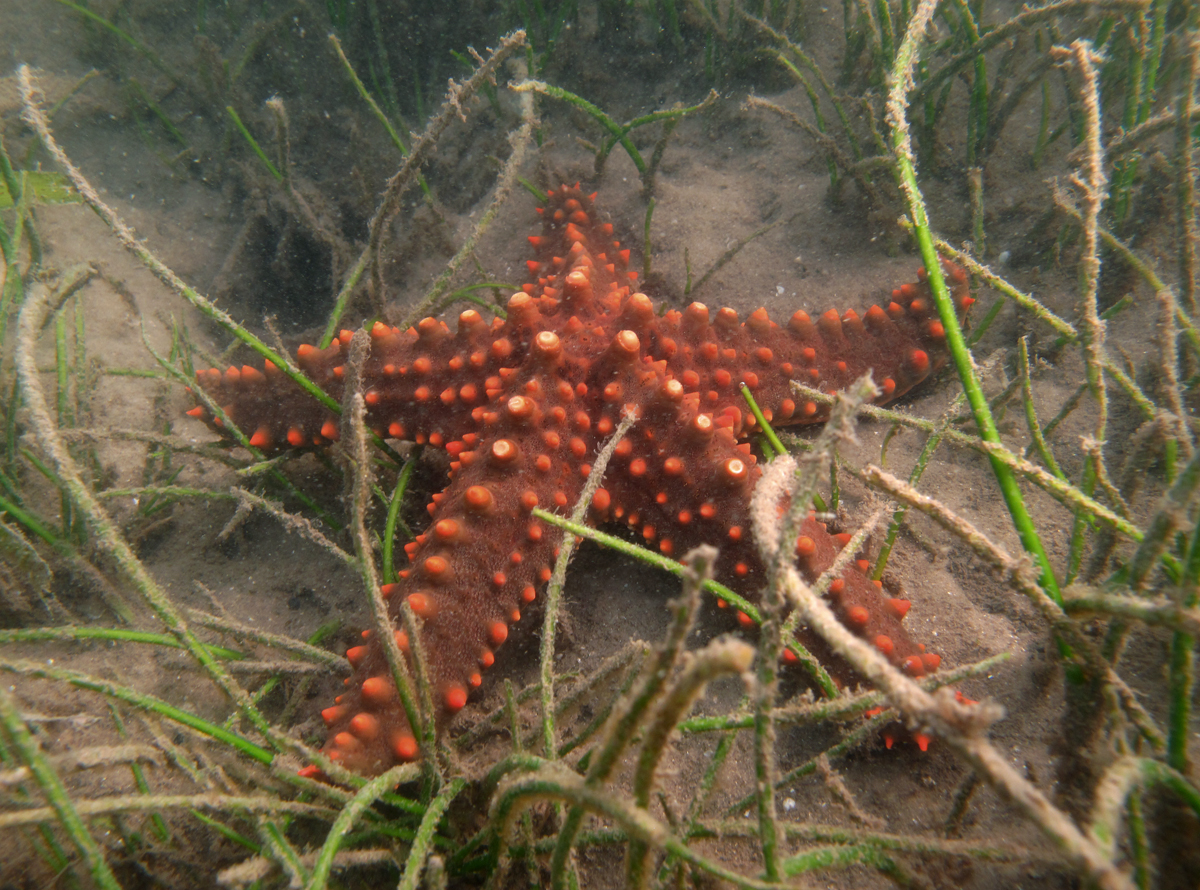
Pentaceraster horridus

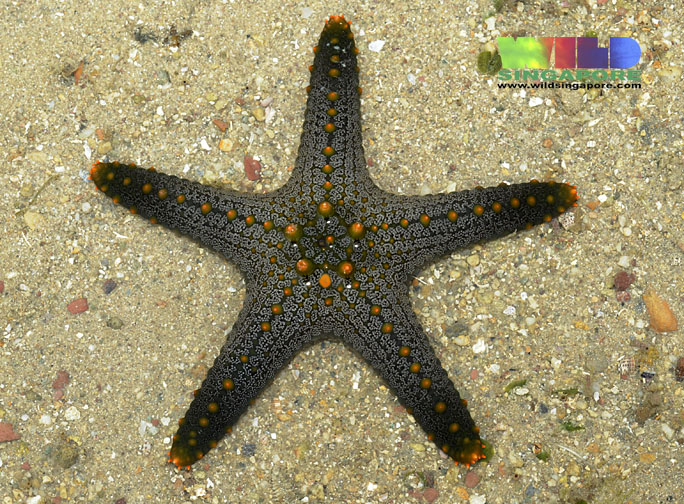
Pentaceraster mammillatus

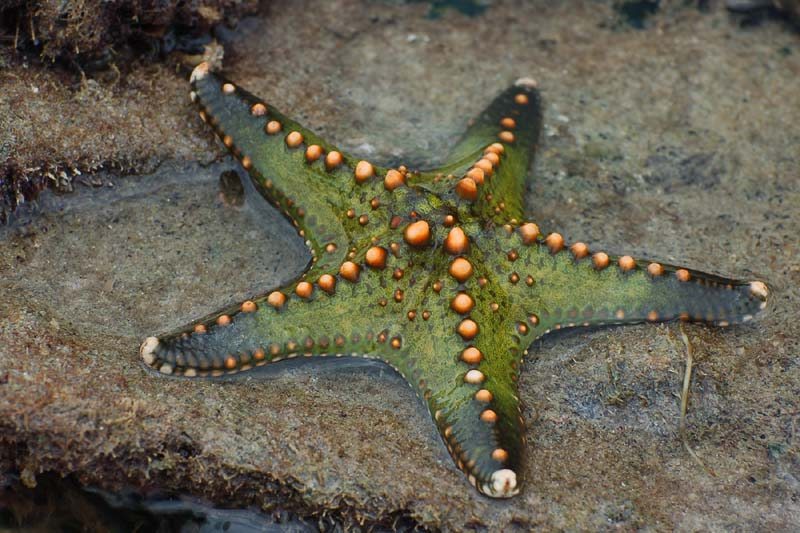
Pentaceraster sp.

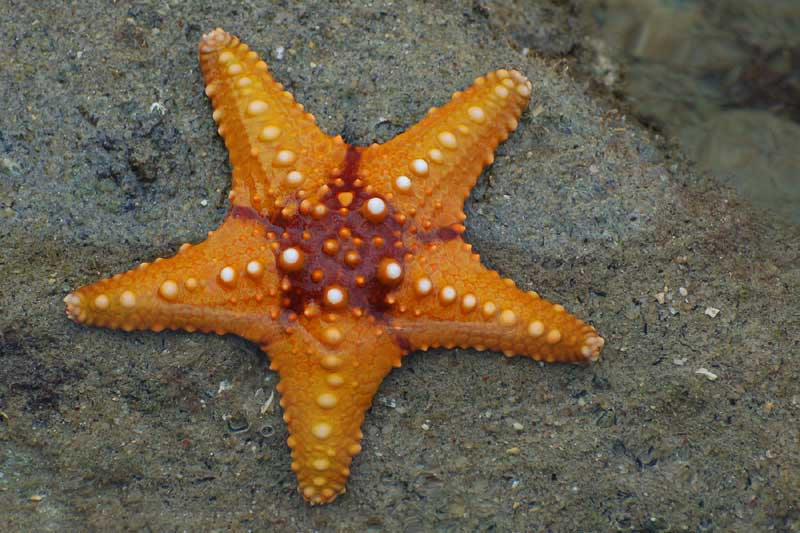
Pentaceraster sp.

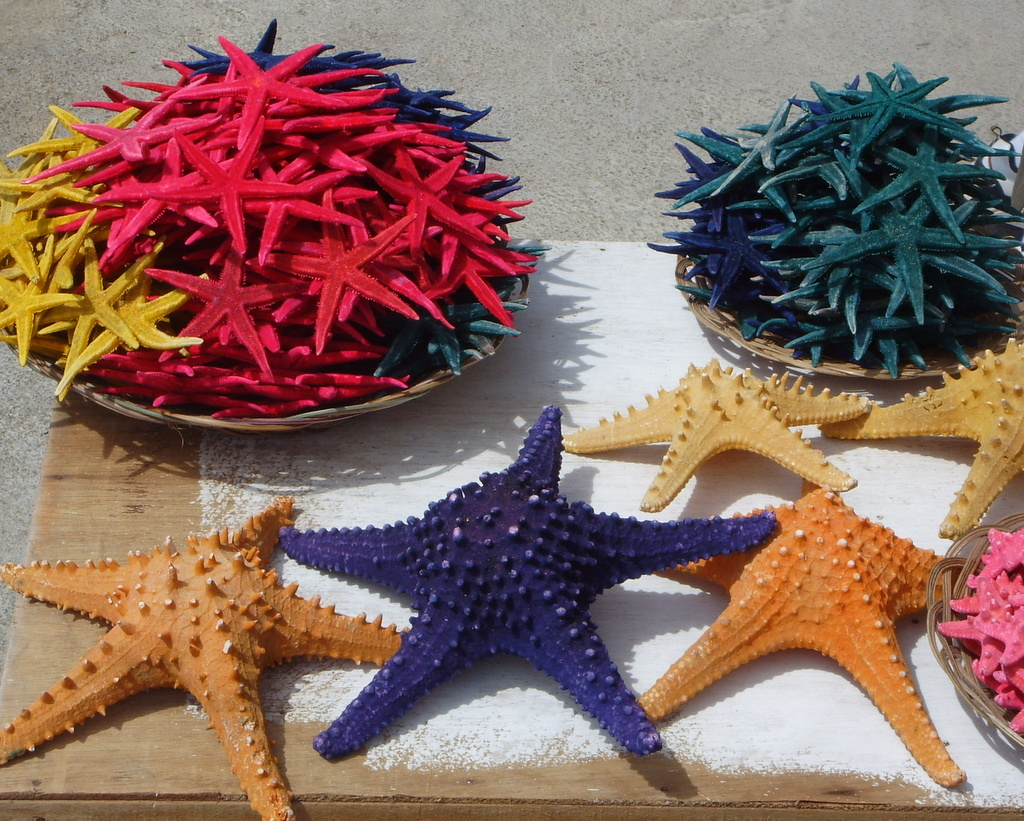
Dried Pentaceraster for sale in Philippines.

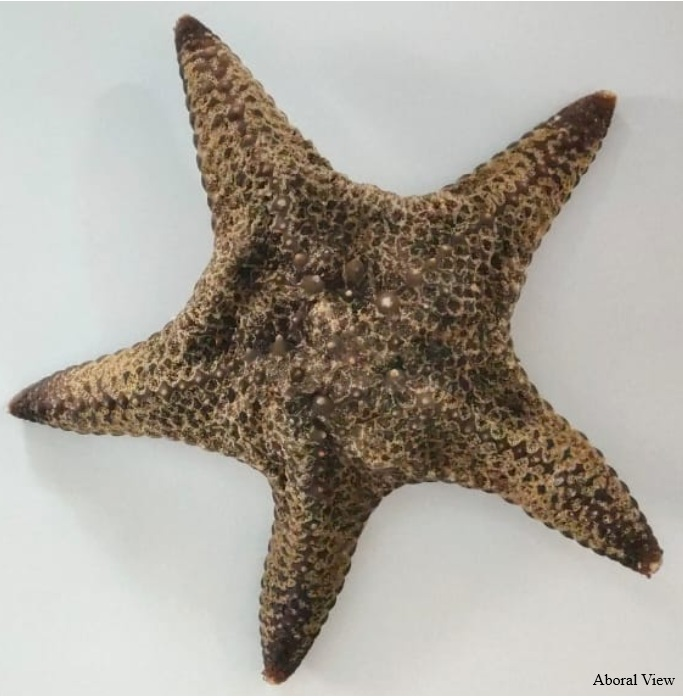
Pentaceraster mammillatus from Bay of Bengal
