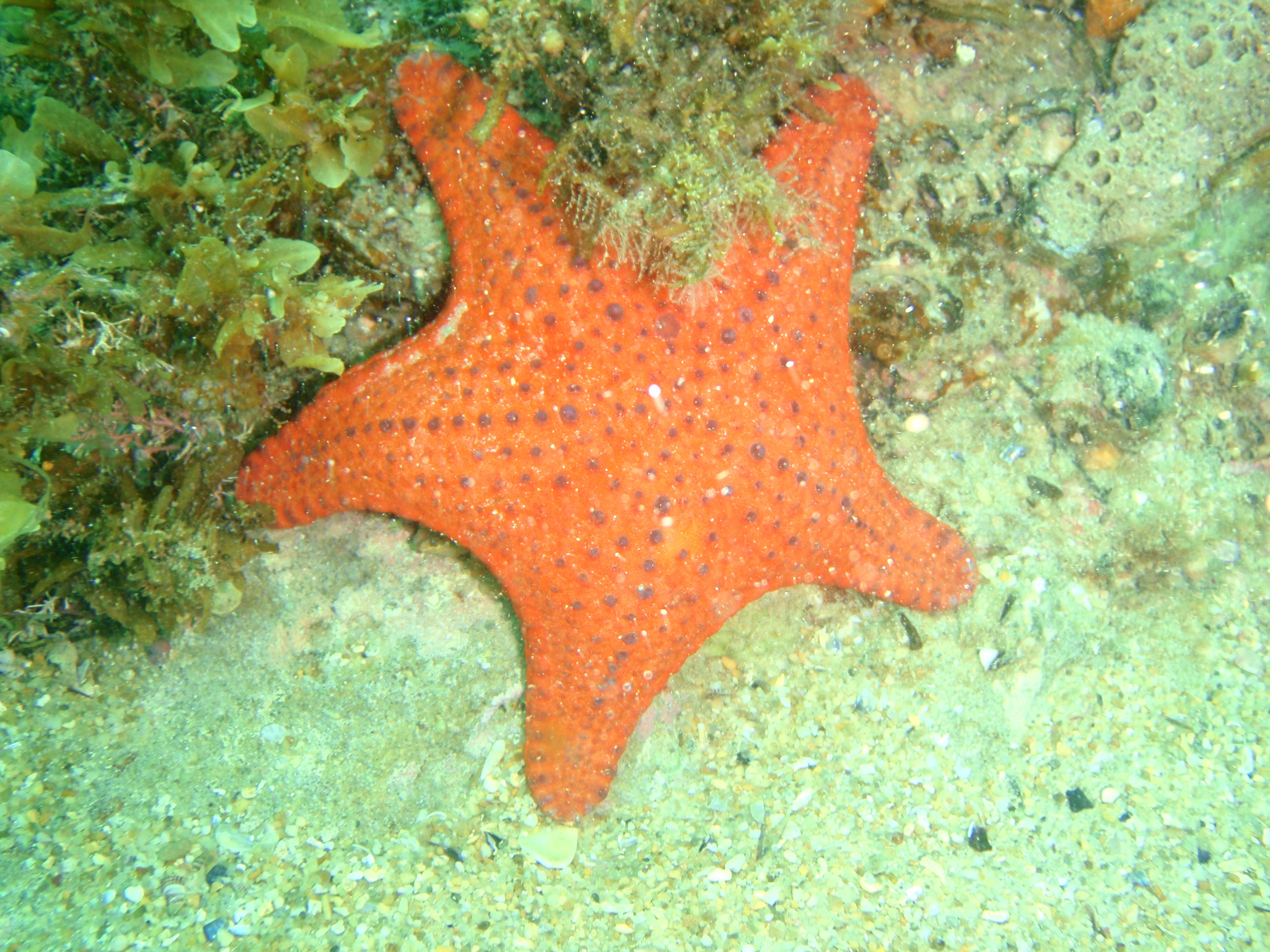

Scientific classification
- Kingdom: Animalia
- Phylum: Echinodermata
- Class: Asteroidea
- Order: Valvatida
- Family: Oreasteridae
- Genus: Anthaster; Döderlein, 1915
- Species: A. valvulatus

Binomial name
- Anthaster valvulatus (Müller & Troschel, 1843)

= Anthaster =

Genus of starfishes

Anthaster valvulatus is a species of sea stars in the family Oreasteridae. It is the sole species in the genus Anthaster. While its common name is the brick red seastar, individuals also occur in purple, orange and multicoloured combinations of these colours.
