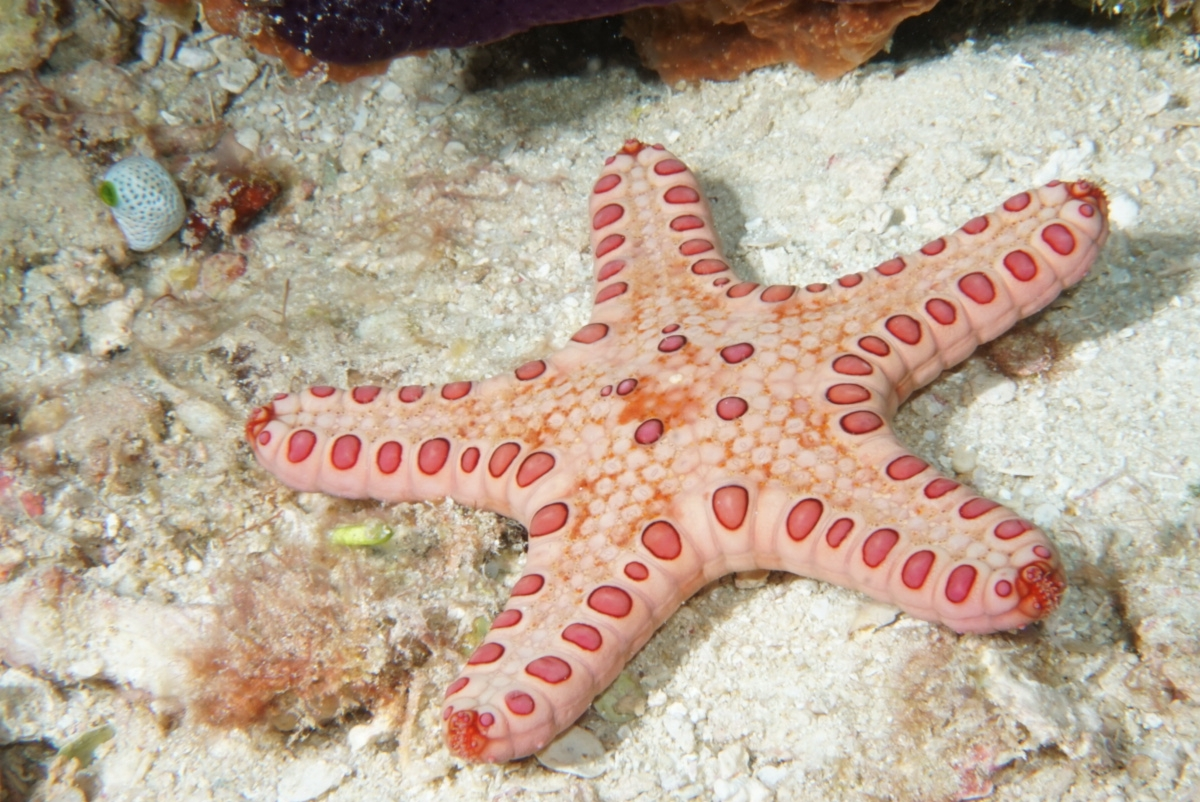

Scientific classification
- Kingdom: Animalia
- Phylum: Echinodermata
- Class: Asteroidea
- Order: Valvatida
- Family: Oreasteridae
- Genus: Monachaster; Döderlein, 1916
- Species: M. sanderi

Binomial name
- Monachaster sanderi (Meissner, 1892)

= Monachaster =

Genus of starfishes

Monachaster sanderi is a species of sea stars in the family Oreasteridae. It is the sole species in the genus Monachaster.
