= Pseudanthenea =

Scientific classification
- Kingdom: Animalia
- Phylum: Echinodermata
- Class: Asteroidea
- Order: Valvatida
- Family: Oreasteridae
- Genus: Pseudanthenea; Döderlein, 1915
- Species: P. grayi

Binomial name
- Pseudanthenea grayi (Perrier, 1875)

Genus of starfishes

Pseudanthenea grayi is a species of sea stars in the family Oreasteridae. It is the sole species in the genus Pseudanthenea.
