= Poraster =

Scientific classification
- Kingdom: Animalia
- Phylum: Echinodermata
- Class: Asteroidea
- Order: Valvatida
- Family: Oreasteridae
- Genus: Poraster; Döderlein, 1916
- Species: P. superbus

Binomial name
- Poraster superbus (Möbius, 1859)

Genus of starfishes

Poraster superbus is a species of sea stars in the family Oreasteridae. It is the sole species in the genus Poraster.
