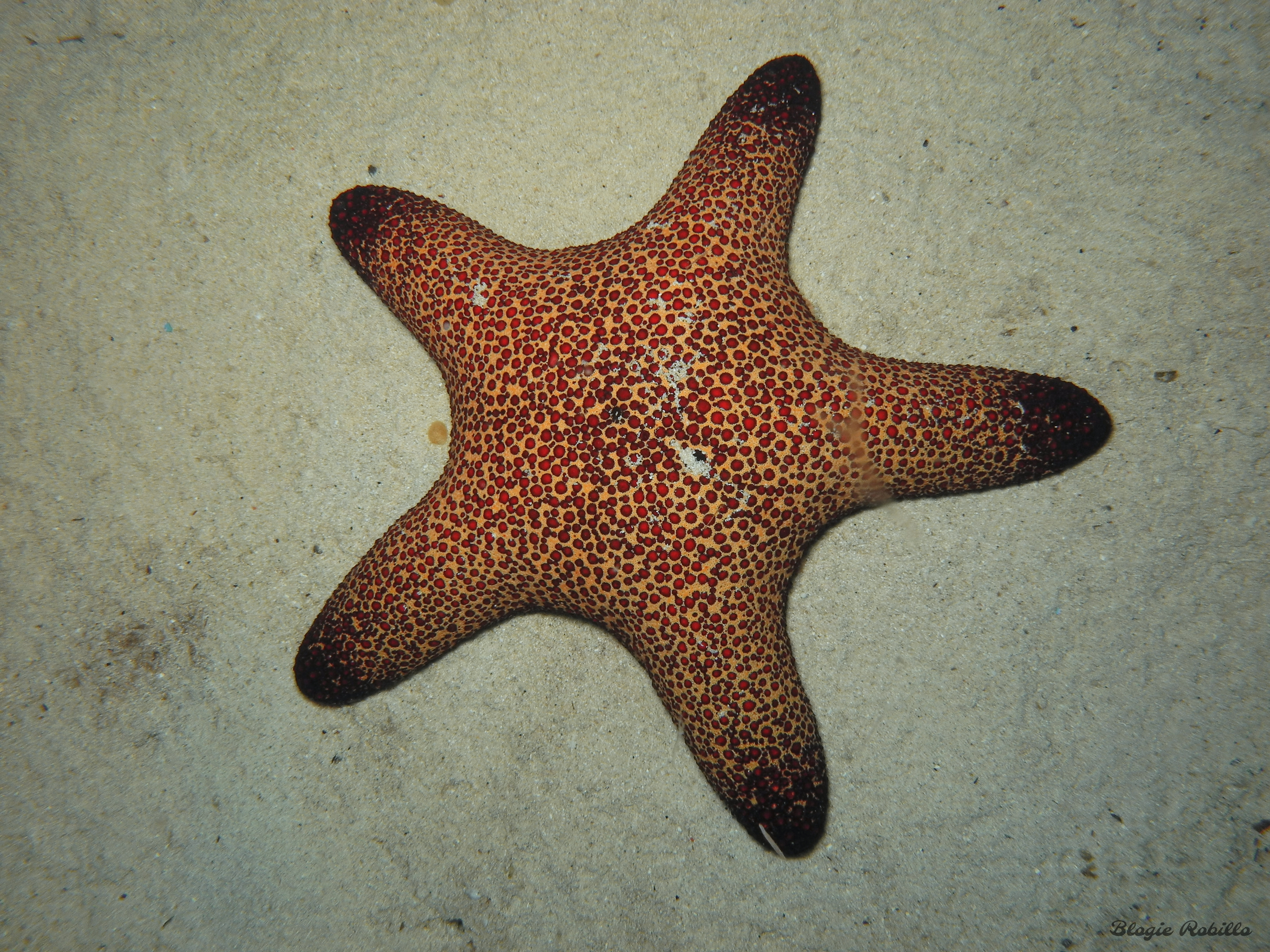
- Pentaster obtusatus

Scientific classification
- Domain: Eukaryota
- Kingdom: Animalia
- Phylum: Echinodermata
- Class: Asteroidea
- Order: Valvatida
- Family: Oreasteridae
- Genus: Pentaster; Döderlein, 1935

Species
- See text.

= Pentaster =

Genus of starfishes

Pentaster is a genus of sea stars in the family Oreasteridae. It is also known as the Blunt Arm Sea Star.

== Taxonomy ==
List of species according to the World Register of Marine Species:

- Pentaster hybridus Döderlein, 1936
- Pentaster obtusatus (Bory de St. Vincent, 1827)
