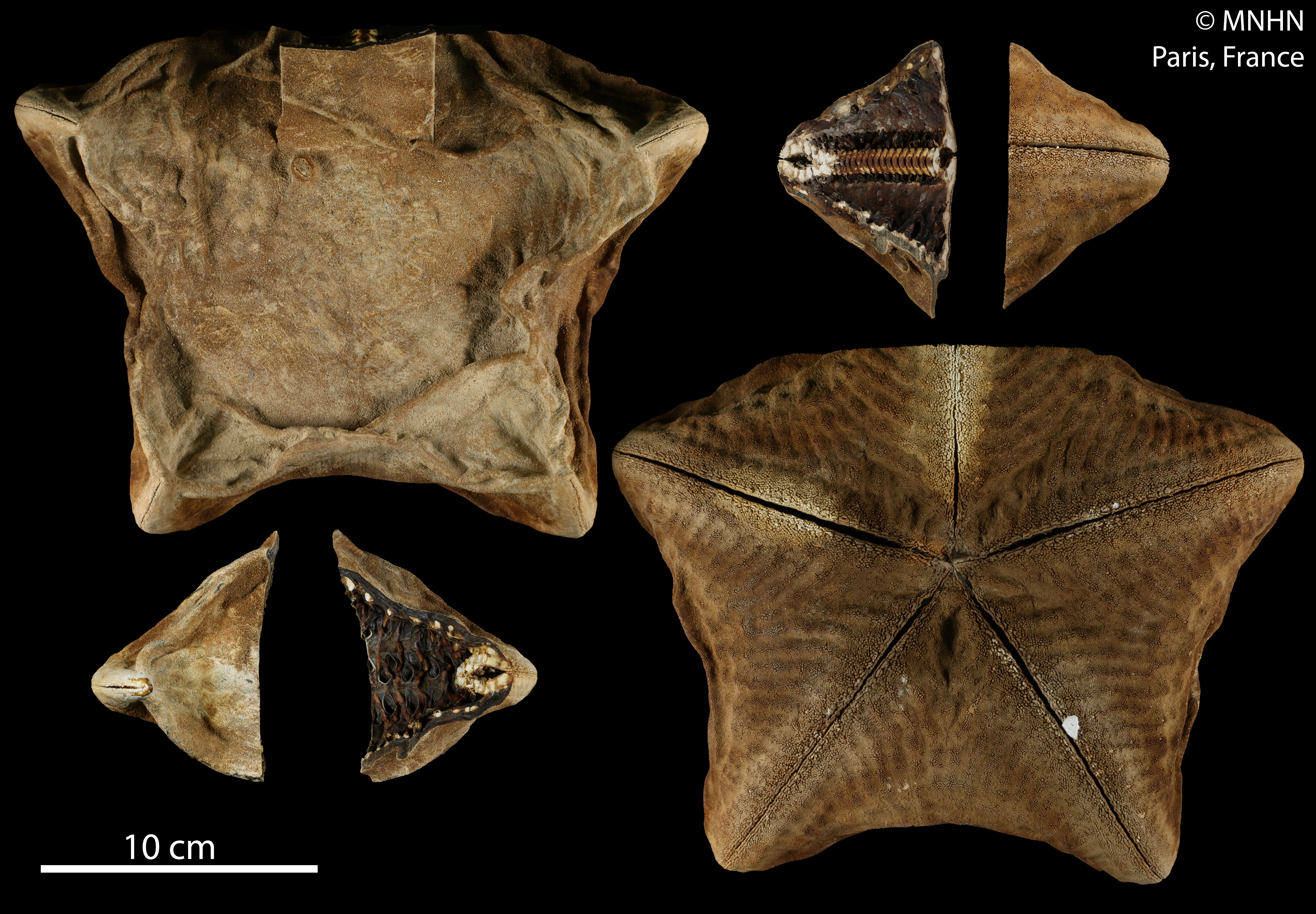

Scientific classification
- Kingdom: Animalia
- Phylum: Echinodermata
- Class: Asteroidea
- Order: Valvatida
- Family: Oreasteridae
- Genus: Astrosarkus; Mah, 2003
- Species: A. idipi

Binomial name
- Astrosarkus idipi Mah, 2003

= Astrosarkus =

Genus of starfishes

Astrosarkus idipi is a species of sea stars in the family Oreasteridae. It is the sole species in the genus Astrosarkus. It is sometimes referred to as a Pumpkin sea star.

== Description and characteristics ==
It is a big sea star with a subpentagonal and very plump body. It is quite recognizable because of its bright orange color, and globally displays the color, texture and size of a pumpkin. It is thus a very big star, measuring approximately 30 cm (12 in) in diameter for 10 cm (4 in) high. The lower face is white dirtied with orange, and crossed by 5 ambulacral grooves. Inside the body, the skeleton is strikingly reduced: the main part of the mass of the star is muscular.

== Habitat and repartition ==
This sea star lives in the sub-reef zone, between 67 and 200 m (220 and 656 ft) deep, and seems rather widely distributed in the Indo-pacific, From Reunion island to Samoa. However, it is still poorly known, and only 6 specimens have been collected to this day.

== In popular culture ==
Along with some other deep-sea creatures, this sea star has been used in Japan as a model for a sushi-shaped gachapon toy. There, the species is referred to as ryugu sakura hitode, which means "dragon palace cherry blossom sea star".
