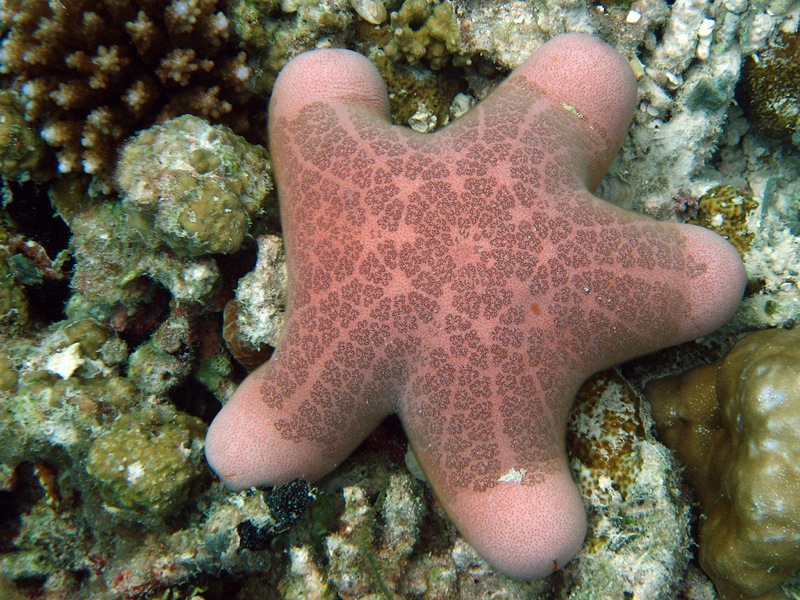
- Choriaster granulatus

Scientific classification
- Kingdom: Animalia
- Phylum: Echinodermata
- Class: Asteroidea
- Order: Valvatida
- Family: Oreasteridae; Fisher, 1911

Genera
- 20, see text

= Oreasteridae =

Family of starfishes

The Oreasteridae are a family of sea stars in the class Asteroidea.

== Description and characteristics ==
This family contains many species of regular starfishes with usually 5 arms around a stiff, convex and often brightly colored body. Whereas some species are very easy to identify, like the "pincushion seastars" (Culcita sp.), some other can be difficult to tell apart.

== Selected genera ==
List source :

- Acheronaster H.E.S. Clark, 1982 -- 1 species
- Anthaster Döderlein, 1915 -- 1 species
- Anthenea Gray, 1840 -- 22 species
- Astrosarkus Mah, 2003 -- 1 species
- Bothriaster Döderlein, 1916 -- 1 species
- Choriaster Lutken, 1869 -- 1 species
- Culcita Agassiz, 1836 -- 3 species
- Goniodiscaster H.L. Clark, 1909 -- 14 species
- Gymnanthenea H.L. Clark, 1938 -- 2 species
- Halityle Fisher, 1913 -- 1 species
- Monachaster Döderlein, 1916 -- 1 species
- Nectriaster H.L. Clark, 1946 -- 1 species
- Nidorellia Gray, 1840 -- 1 species
- Oreaster Müller & Troschel, 1842 -- 2 species
- Pentaceraster Döderlein, 1916 -- 14 species
- Pentaster Döderlein, 1935 -- 2 species
- Poraster Döderlein, 1916 -- 1 species
- Protoreaster Döderlein, 1916 -- 3 species
- Pseudanthenea Döderlein, 1915 -- 1 species
- Pseudoreaster Verrill, 1899 -- 1 species

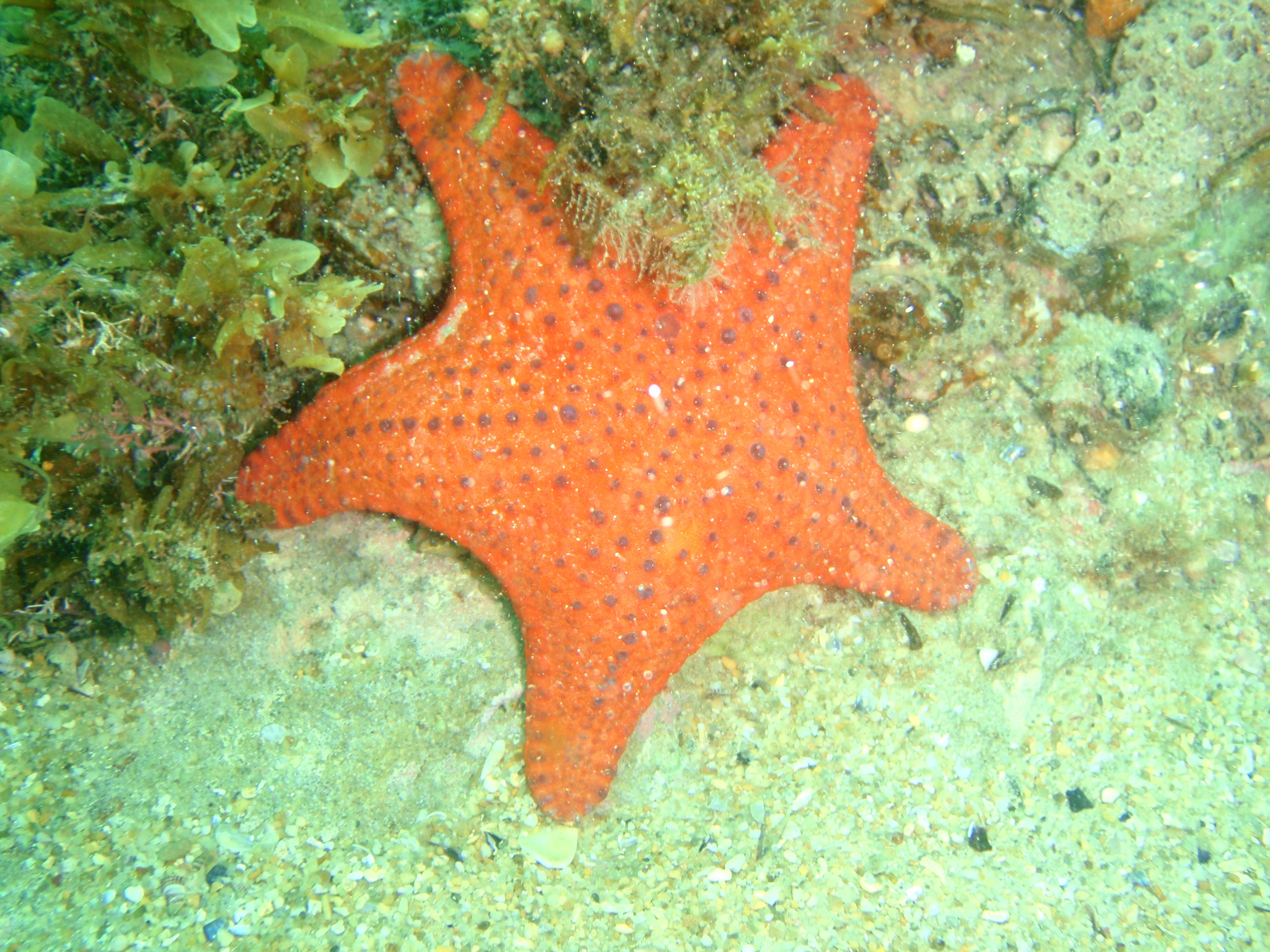
Anthaster valvulatus

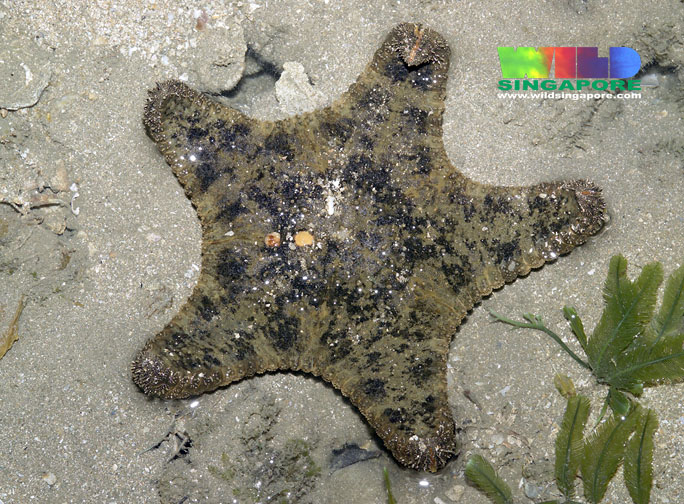
Anthenea aspera

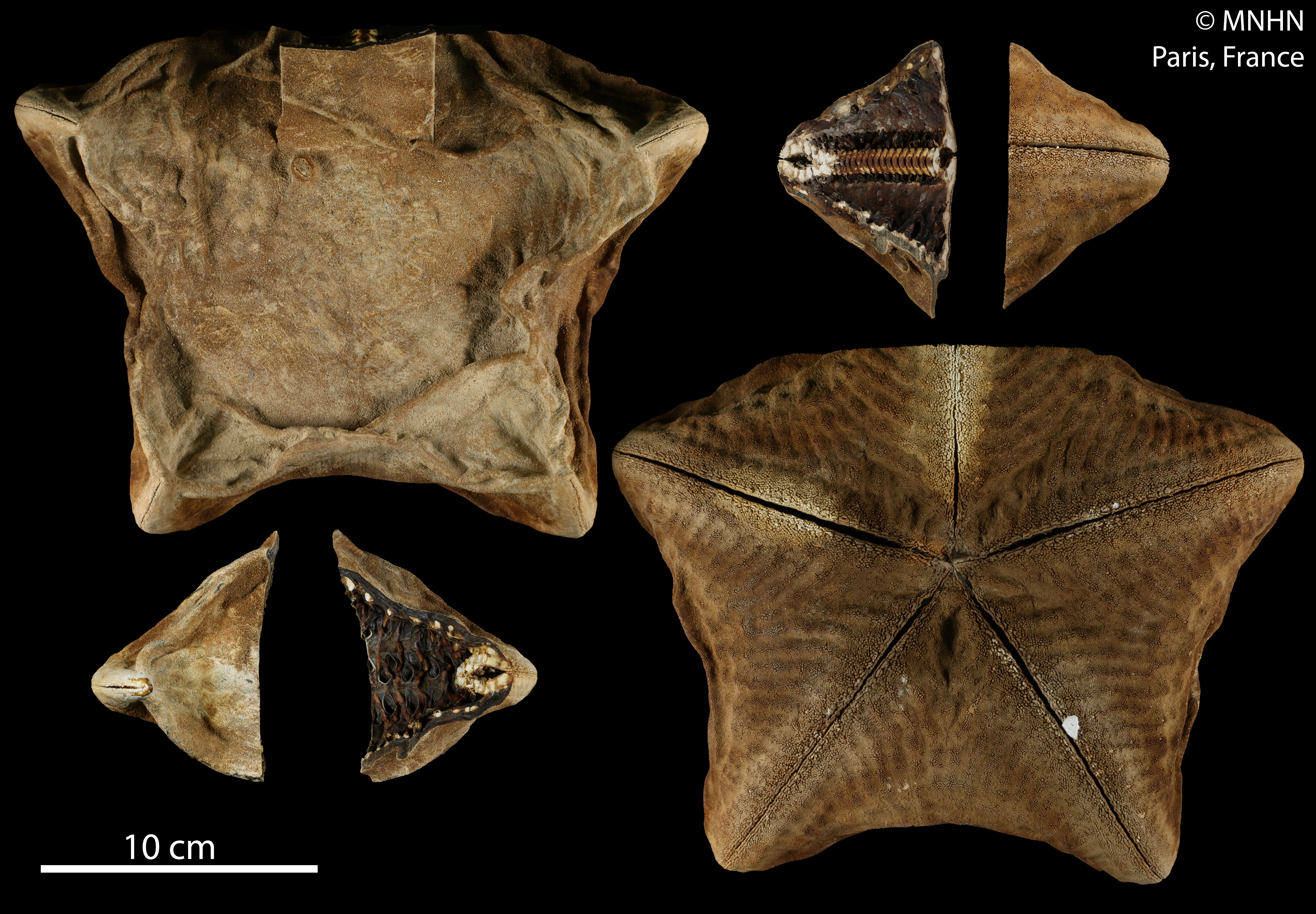
Astrosarkus idipi (dried, MNHN)

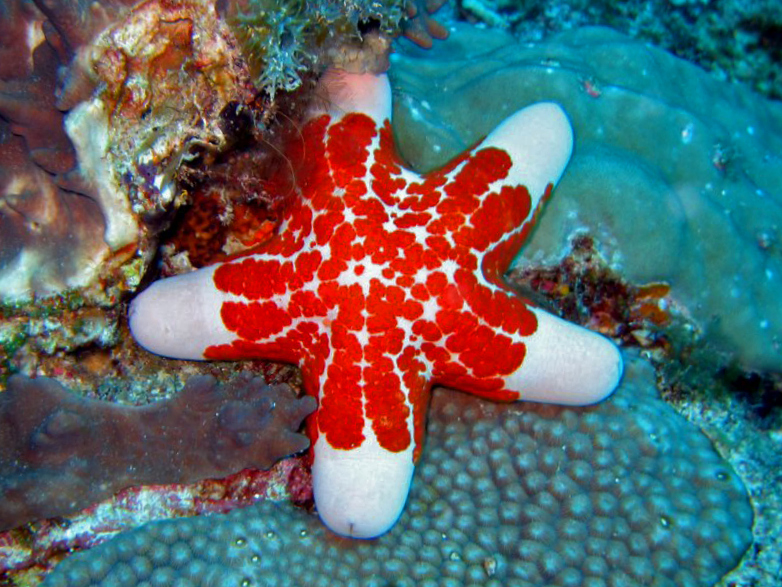
Choriaster granulatus

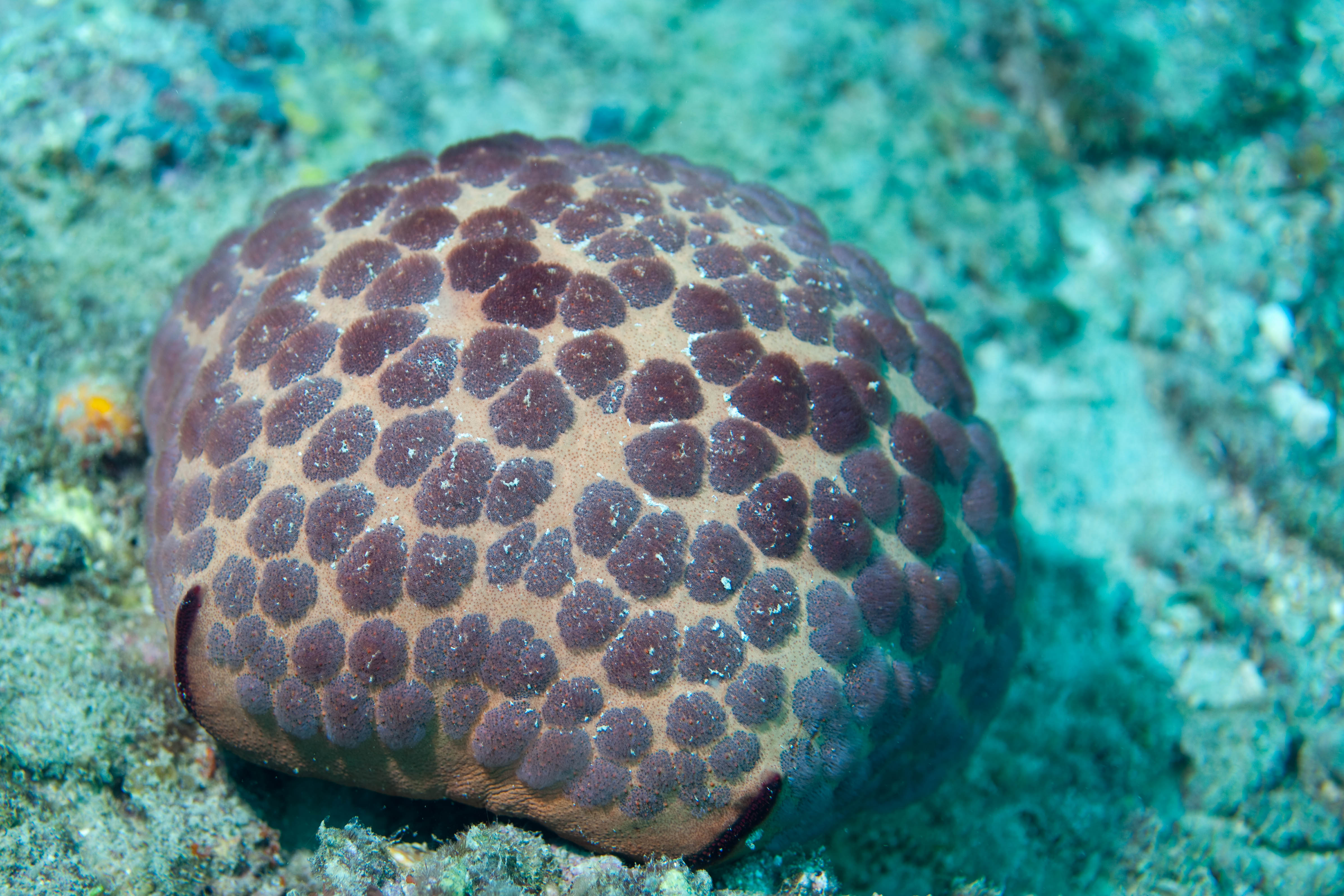
Culcita novaeguineae

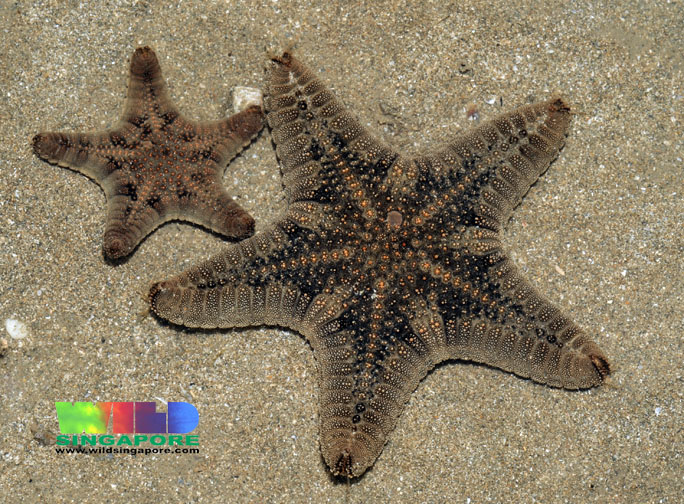
Goniodiscaster scabra

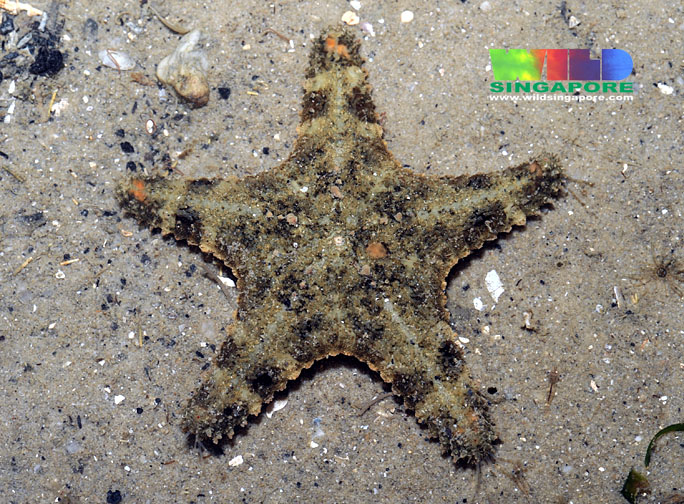
Gymnanthenea laevis

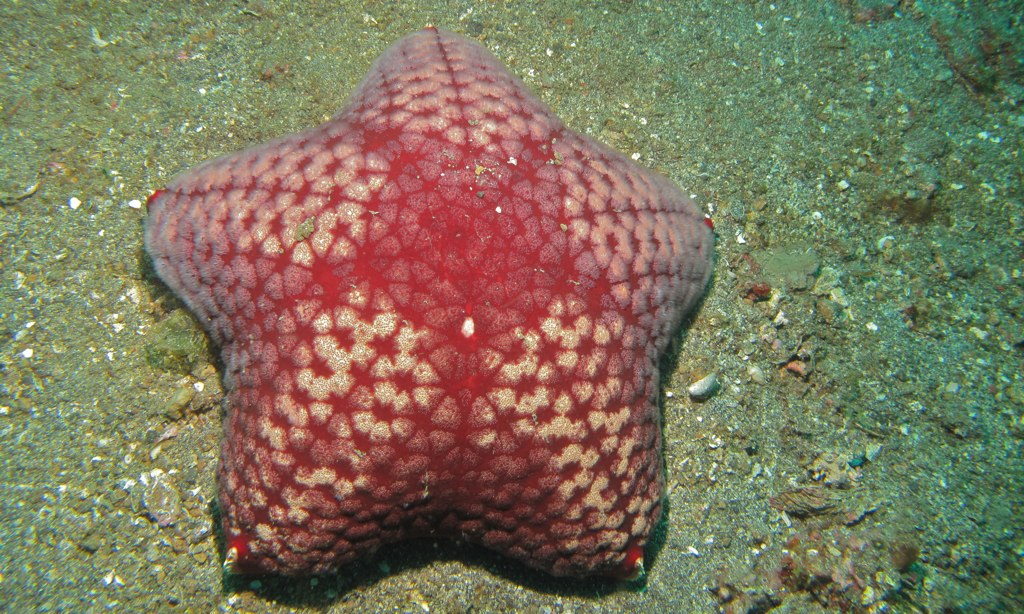
Halityle regularis

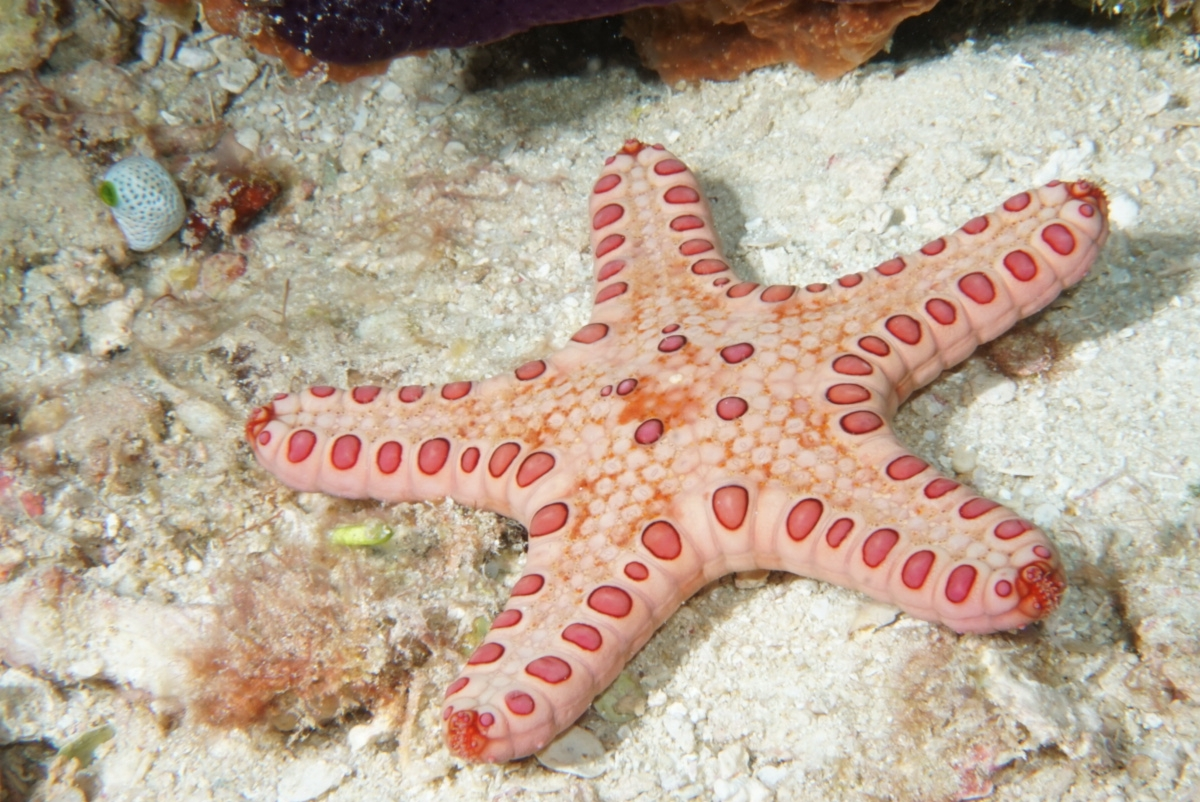
Monachaster sanderi

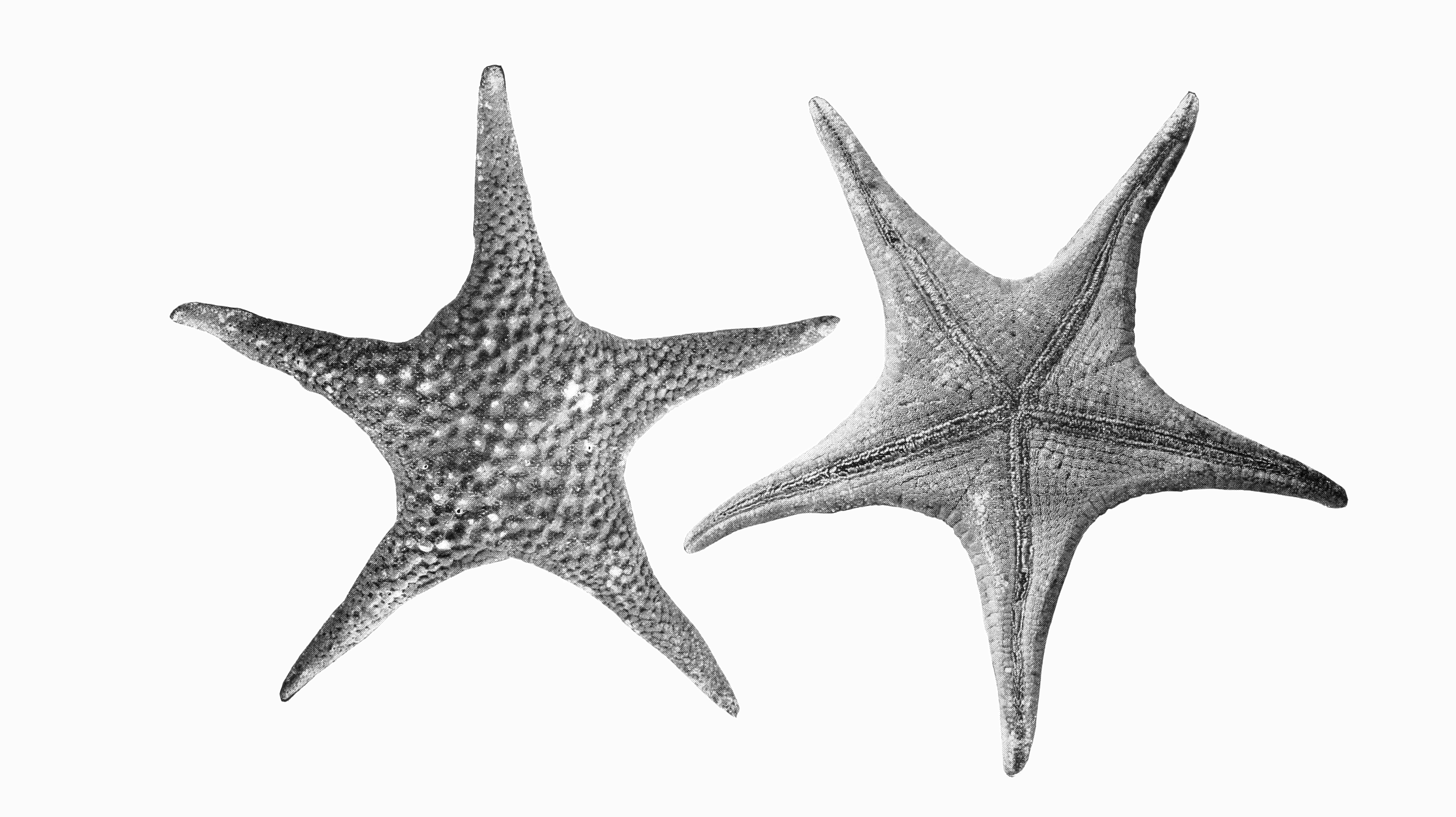
Nectriaster monacanthus

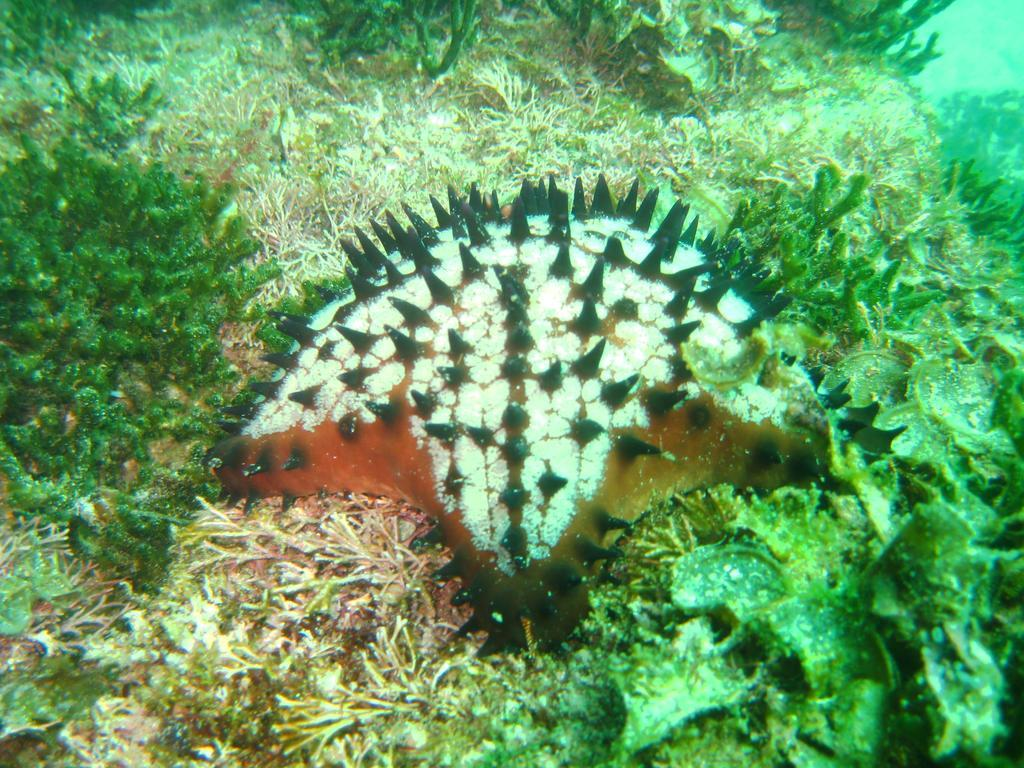
Nidorellia armata

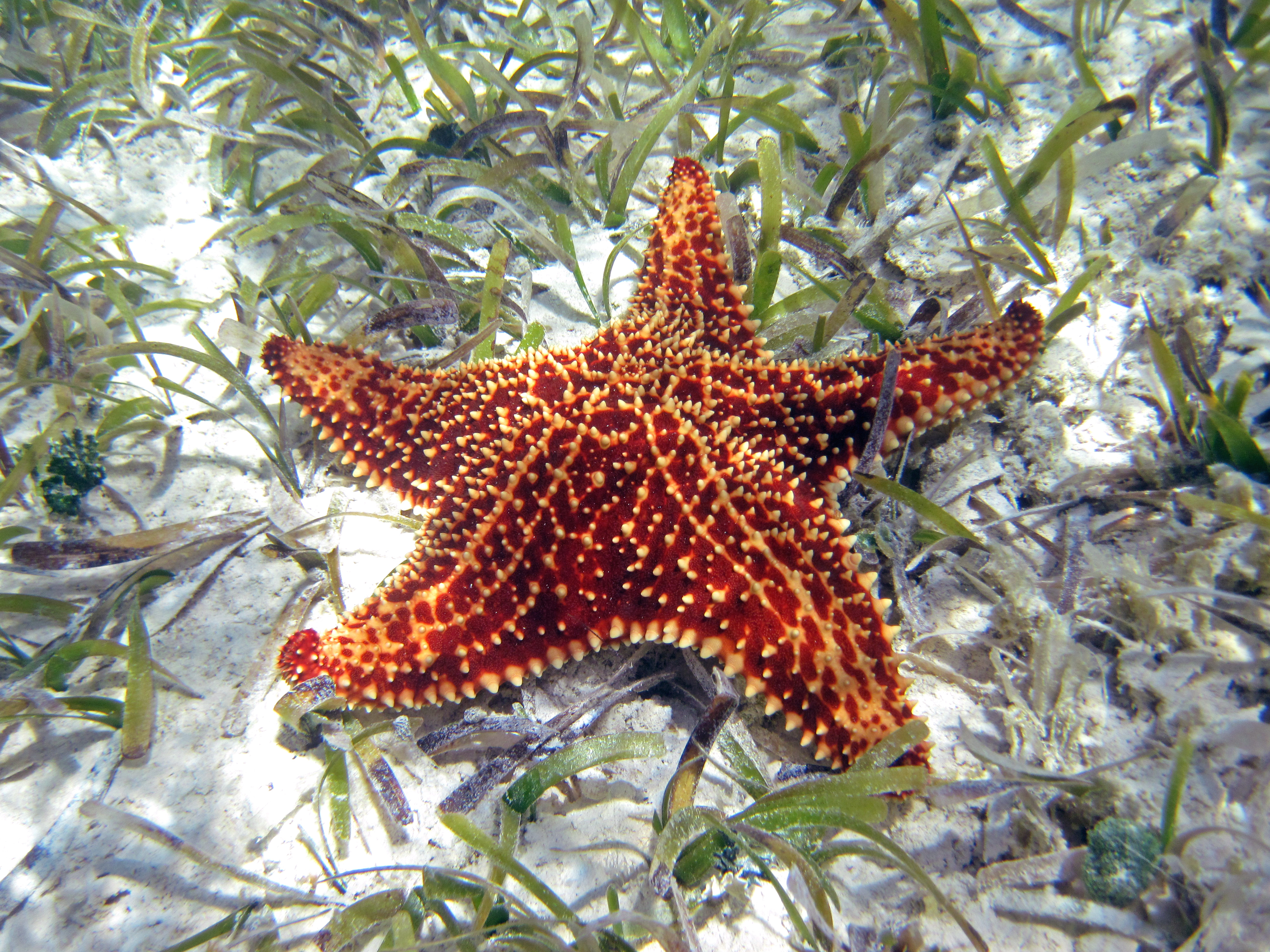
Oreaster reticulatus

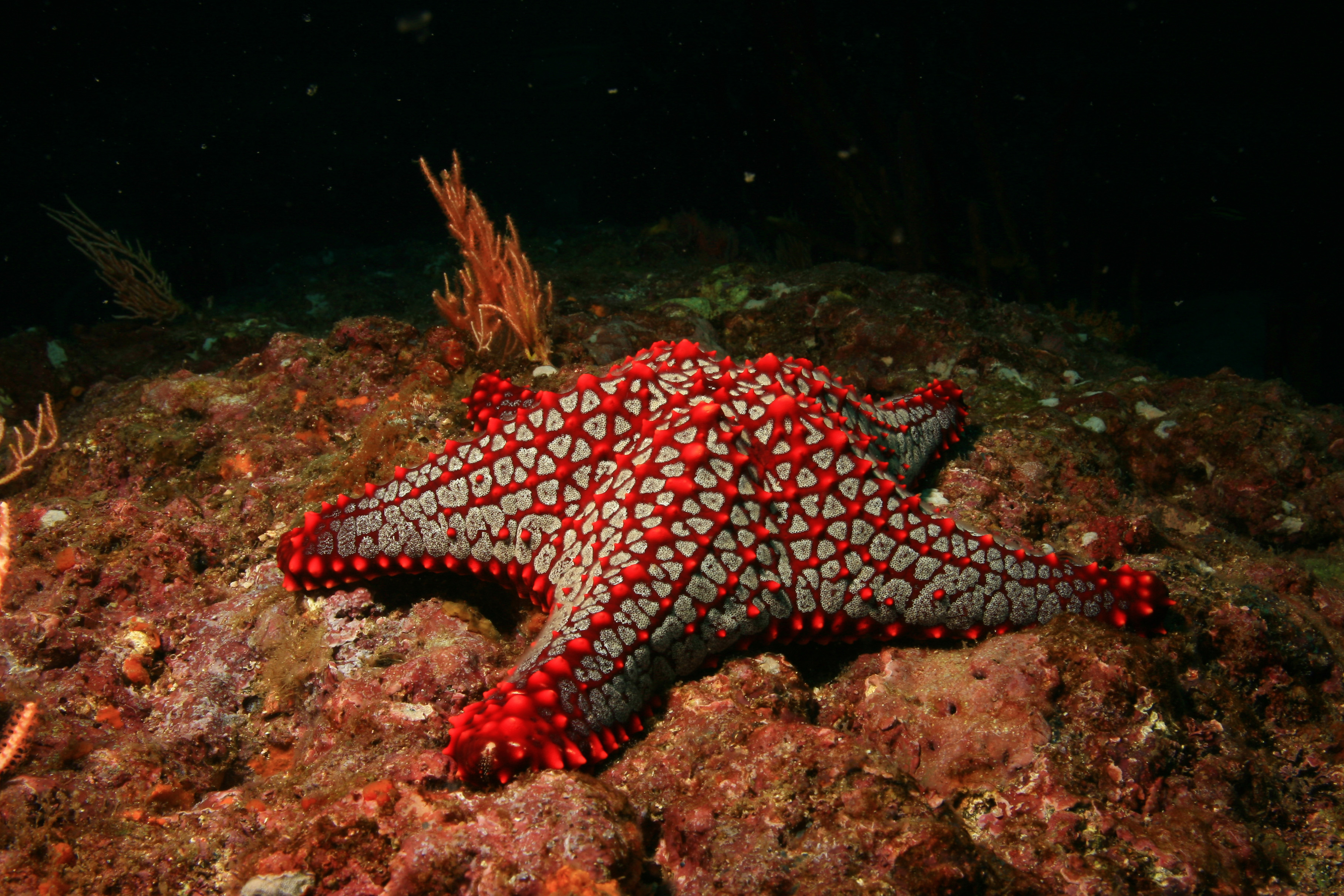
Pentaceraster cumingi

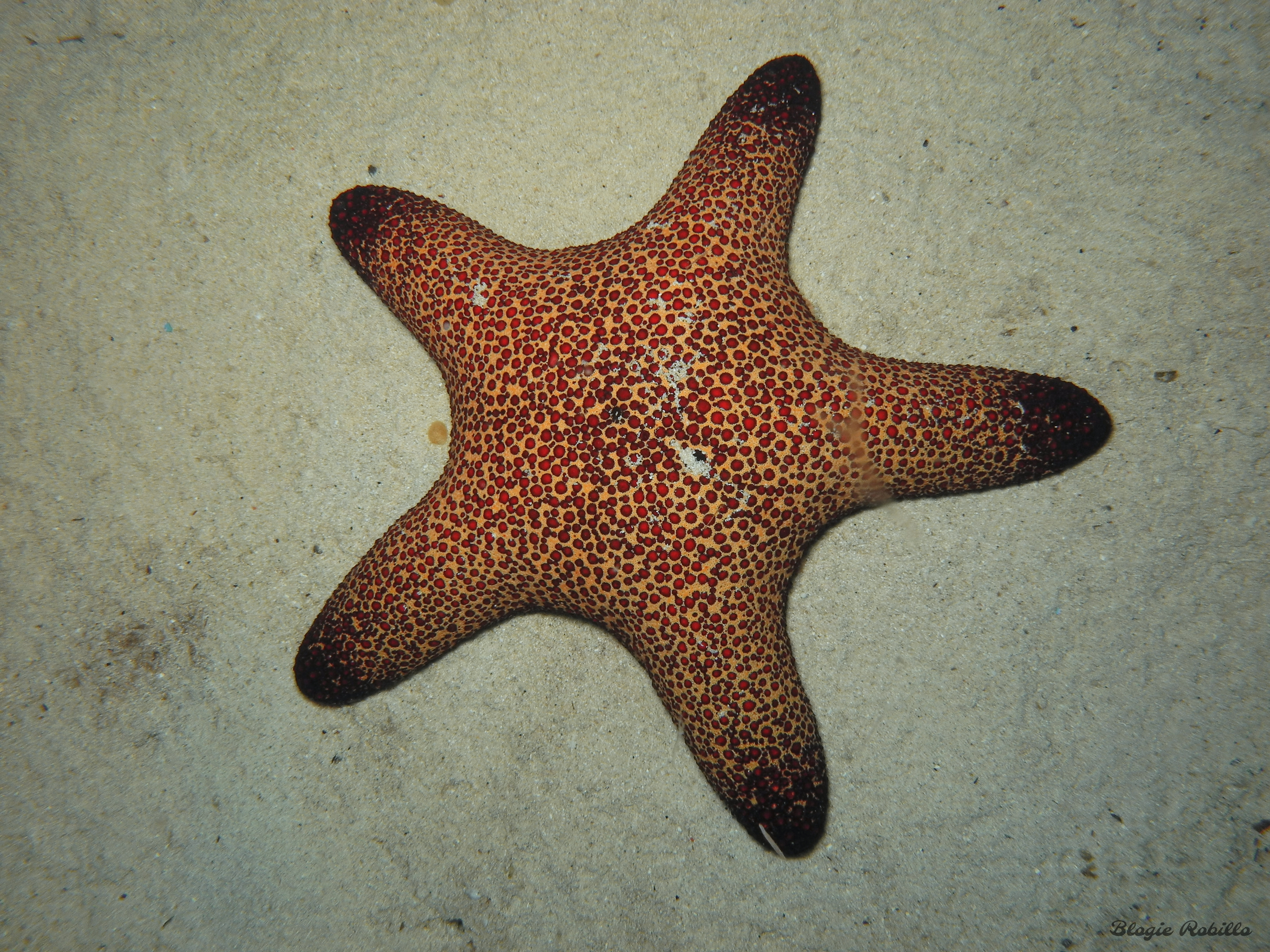
Pentaster obtusatus

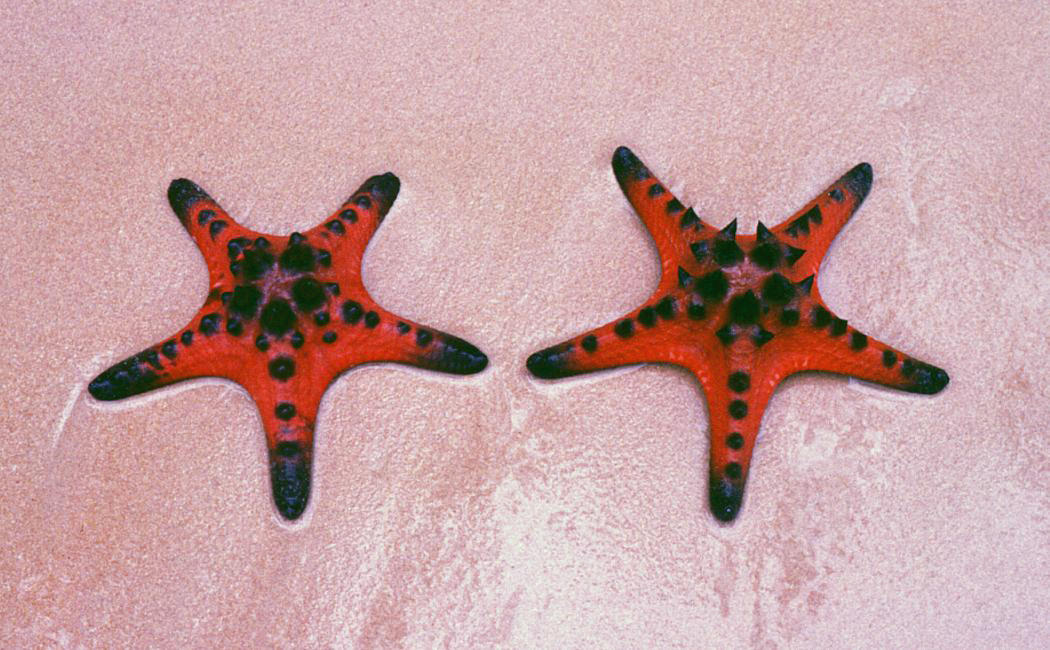
Protoreaster nodosus

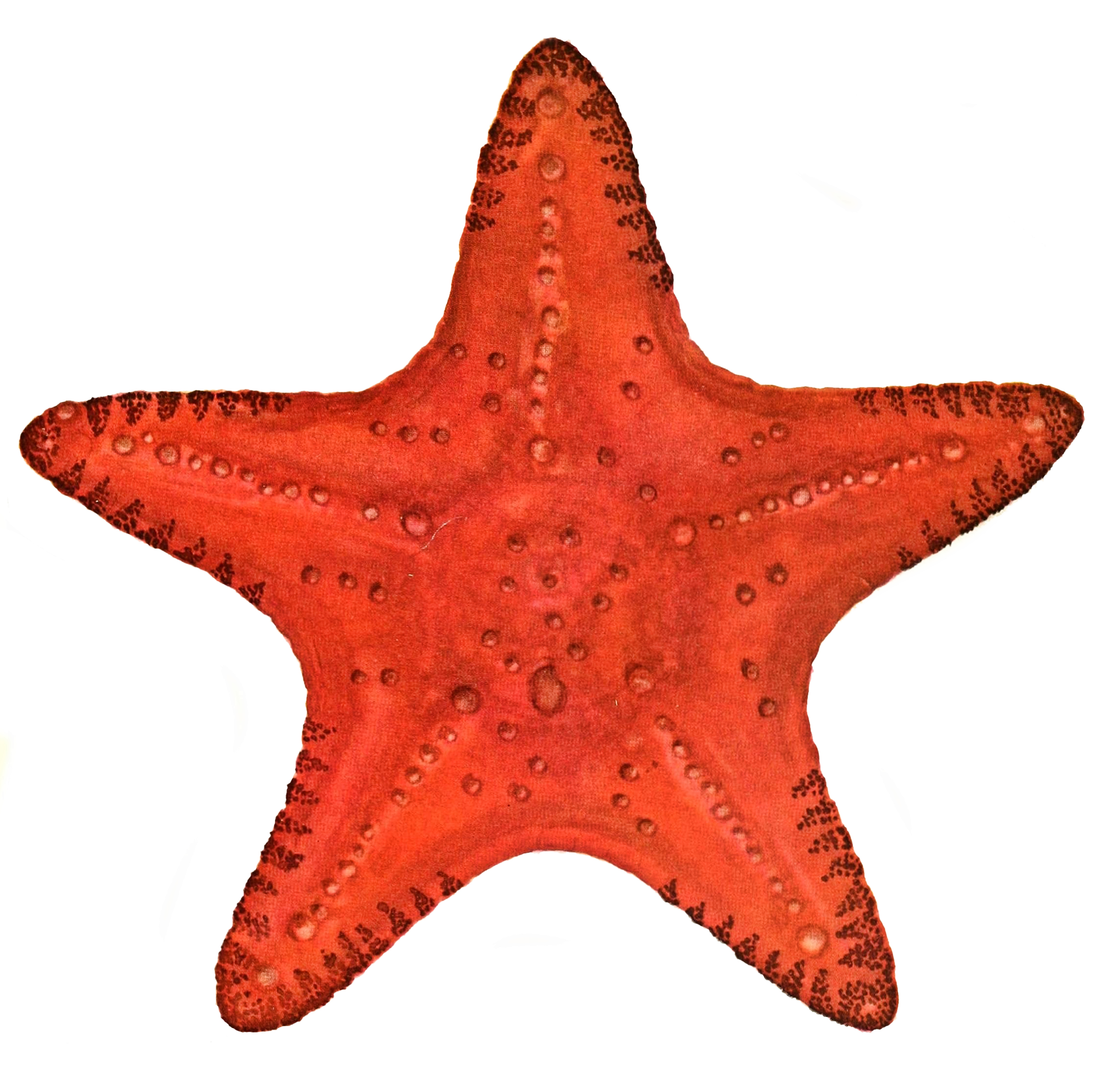
Pseudoreaster obtusangulus
