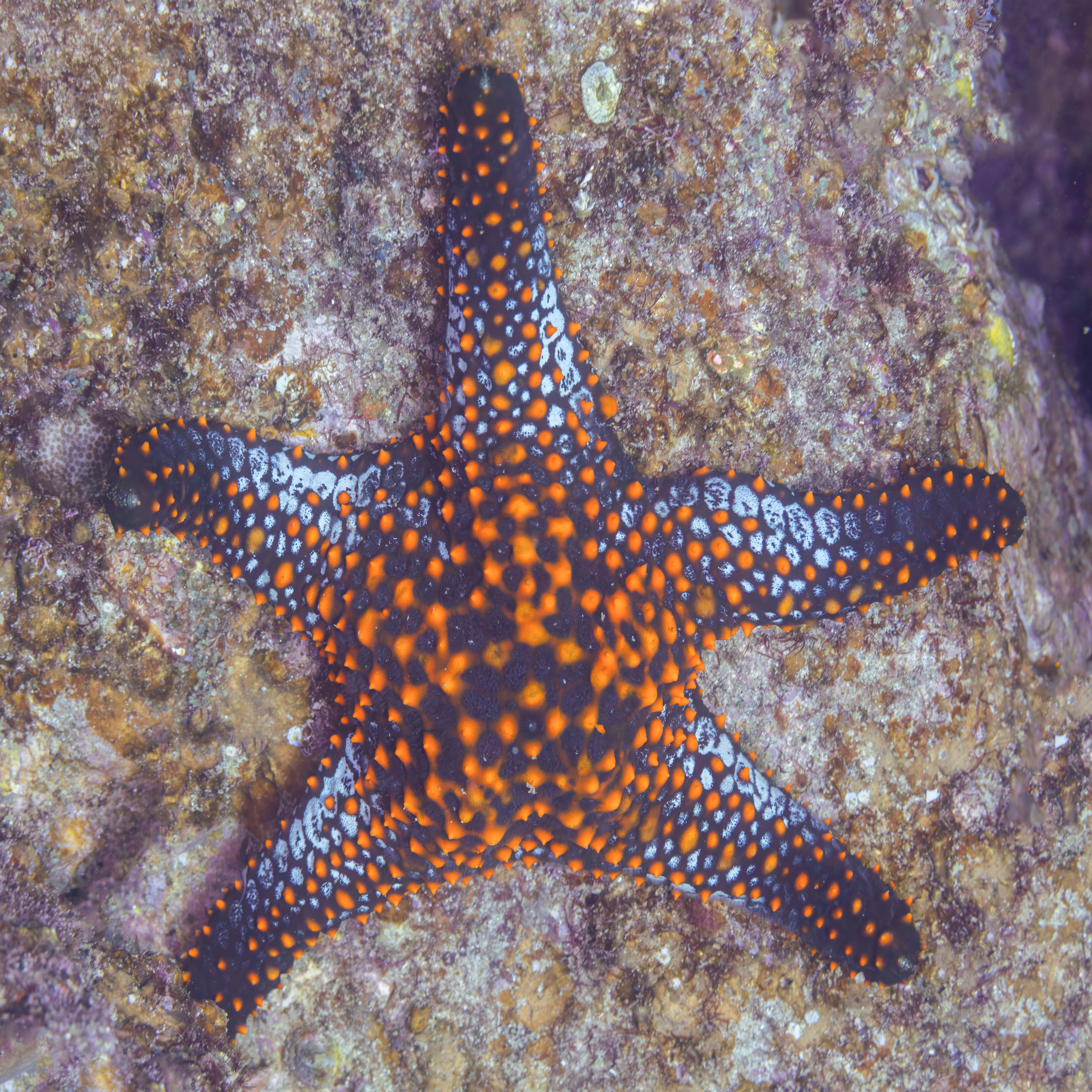
- Pentaceraster cumingi in Coiba National Park, Panama

Scientific classification
- Kingdom: Animalia
- Phylum: Echinodermata
- Class: Asteroidea
- Order: Valvatida
- Family: Oreasteridae
- Genus: Pentaceraster
- Species: P. cumingi

Binomial name
- Pentaceraster cumingi (Gray, 1840)

= Pentaceraster cumingi =

Species of starfish

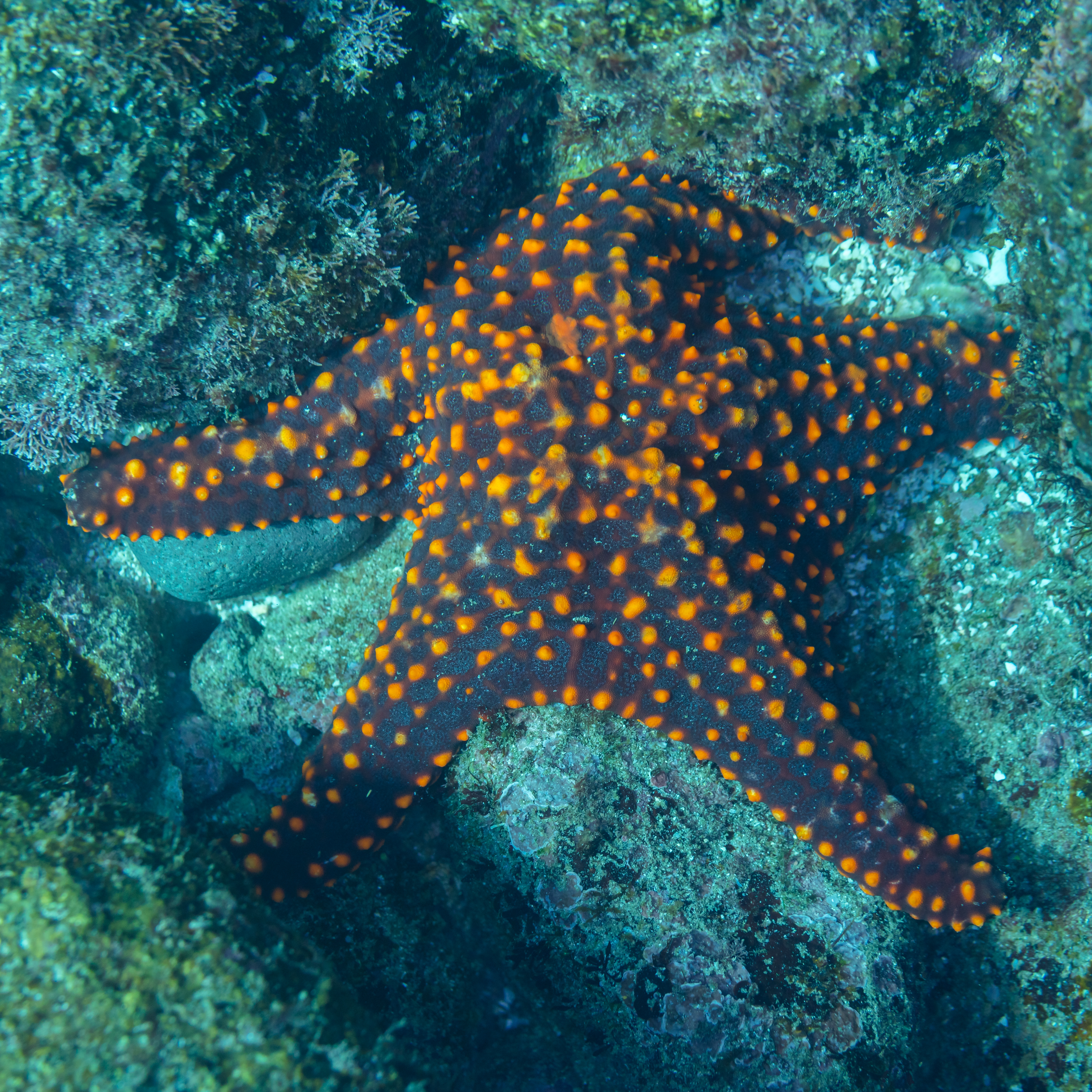
Exemplar in Baja California (Mexico)

Pentaceraster cumingi, sometimes known as the Panamic cushion star, Cortez starfish or knobby star (a name also used for other species), is a species of starfish in the family Oreasteridae. It is found in warmer parts of the East Pacific (Gulf of California to northwest Peru, including offshore islands like the Galápagos) and in Hawaii. In Panama this species has been collected from the Pearl Islands (depth 8 m), Gulf of Panama, and off Coiba Island, Gulf of Chiriqui. It reaches a diameter of about 30 cm (12 in).

== Distribution and habitat ==
P. cumingi is found along the coasts of the Tropical Eastern Pacific and beyond, ranging as far north as the Gulf of California and as far south as the coast of northern Peru. It inhabits the shallow sub-tidal zone, usually in rocky terrain.

== Diet ==
P. cumingi primarily feeds by scavenging and through a carnivorous diet. Its diet consists of ocean floor algae, microscopic organisms, and seagrass. On occasion, P. cumingi has been known to eat other echinoderms.

== Reproduction ==
P. cumingi reproduces either sexually or asexually. It is gonochoric (having separate sexes). Asexual reproduction, which results in a clonal offspring, occurs by fission, splitting the central disc.

== Ornamentation ==
The skeleton of this species is commonly used for ornamentation and sold as a souvenir in Peru and Mexico. The P. cumingi population has greatly decreased in Peru because of their use as souvenirs, and P. cumingi is now considered close to extinction in this country. The population size in Mexico is unknown.
