= Calamaria doederleini =

Conservation status
- Data Deficient (IUCN 3.1)

Scientific classification
- Kingdom: Animalia
- Phylum: Chordata
- Class: Reptilia
- Order: Squamata
- Suborder: Serpentes
- Family: Colubridae
- Genus: Calamaria
- Species: C. doederleini

Binomial name
- Calamaria doederleini Gough, 1902
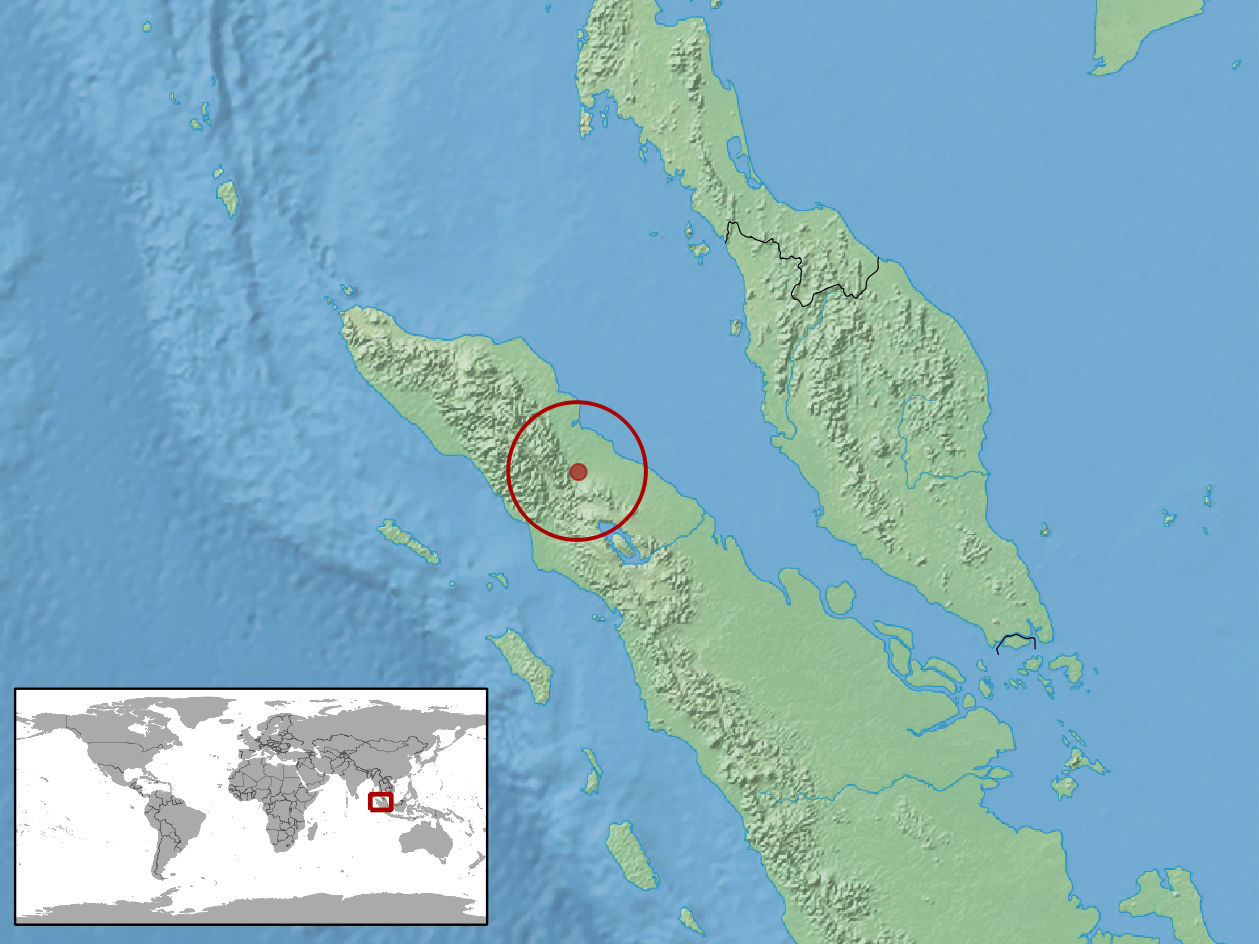

Synonyms
- Calamaria döderleini Gough, 1902

Species of snake

Calamaria doederleini, also known commonly as Döderlein's reed snake, is a species of snake in the subfamily Calamariinae of the family, Colubridae. The species is endemic to Sumatra in Indonesia.

== Etymology ==
The specific name, doederleini, is in honor of German zoologist Ludwig Heinrich Philipp Döderlein.

== Description ==
The head scalation of Calamaria doederleini includes the following characters. The mental is not in contact with the anterior chin shields. The third and fourth upper labials are in contact with the eye. There is a preocular present. Ventrally, C. doederlein is marked with dark crossbars, each of which is more than one ventral wide.

== Habitat ==
The preferred natural habitat of Calamaria doederleini is forest.

== Behavior ==
Calamaria doederleini is terrestrial and fossorial.

== Reproduction ==
Calamaria doederleini is oviparous.
