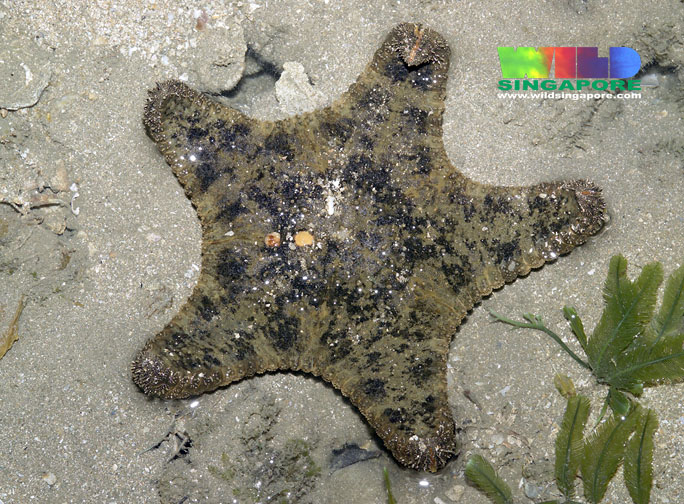
- Cake sea star (Anthenea aspera)

Scientific classification
- Kingdom: Animalia
- Phylum: Echinodermata
- Class: Asteroidea
- Order: Valvatida
- Family: Oreasteridae
- Genus: Anthenea; J.E.Gray, 1840

Species
- See text.

Synonyms
- Hosea J.E.Gray, 1866 (lapsus for Hosia J.E.Gray, 1840); Hosia J.E.Gray, 1840 (synonym sec. Perrier (1875))

= Anthenea =

Genus of starfishes

Anthenea is a genus of sea stars in the family Oreasteridae. Members of this genus are most commonly observed off the coasts of Australia and southeast Asia.

== Selected species ==
- Anthenea acanthodes H.L. Clark, 1938
- Anthenea aspera Döderlein, 1915
- Anthenea australiae Döderlein, 1915
- Anthenea chinensis J.E.Gray, 1840
- Anthenea crassa H.L. Clark, 1938
- Anthenea crudelis Döderlein, 1915
- Anthenea diazi Domantay, 1969
- Anthenea edmondi A.M.Clark, 1970
- Anthenea elegans H.L. Clark, 1938
- Anthenea flavescens J.E.Gray, 1840
- Anthenea godeffroyi Döderlein, 1915
- Anthenea grayi Perrier, 1875
- Anthenea mertoni Koehler, 1910
- Anthenea mexicana A.H. Clark, 1916
- Anthenea obesa H.L. Clark, 1938
- Anthenea pentagonula Lamarck, 1816
- Anthenea polygnatha H.L. Clark, 1938
- Anthenea regalis Koehler, 1910
- Anthenea rudis Koehler, 1910
- Anthenea sibogae Döderlein, 1915
- Anthenea tuberculosa J.E.Gray, 1847
- Anthenea viguieri Döderlein, 1915

List source :
