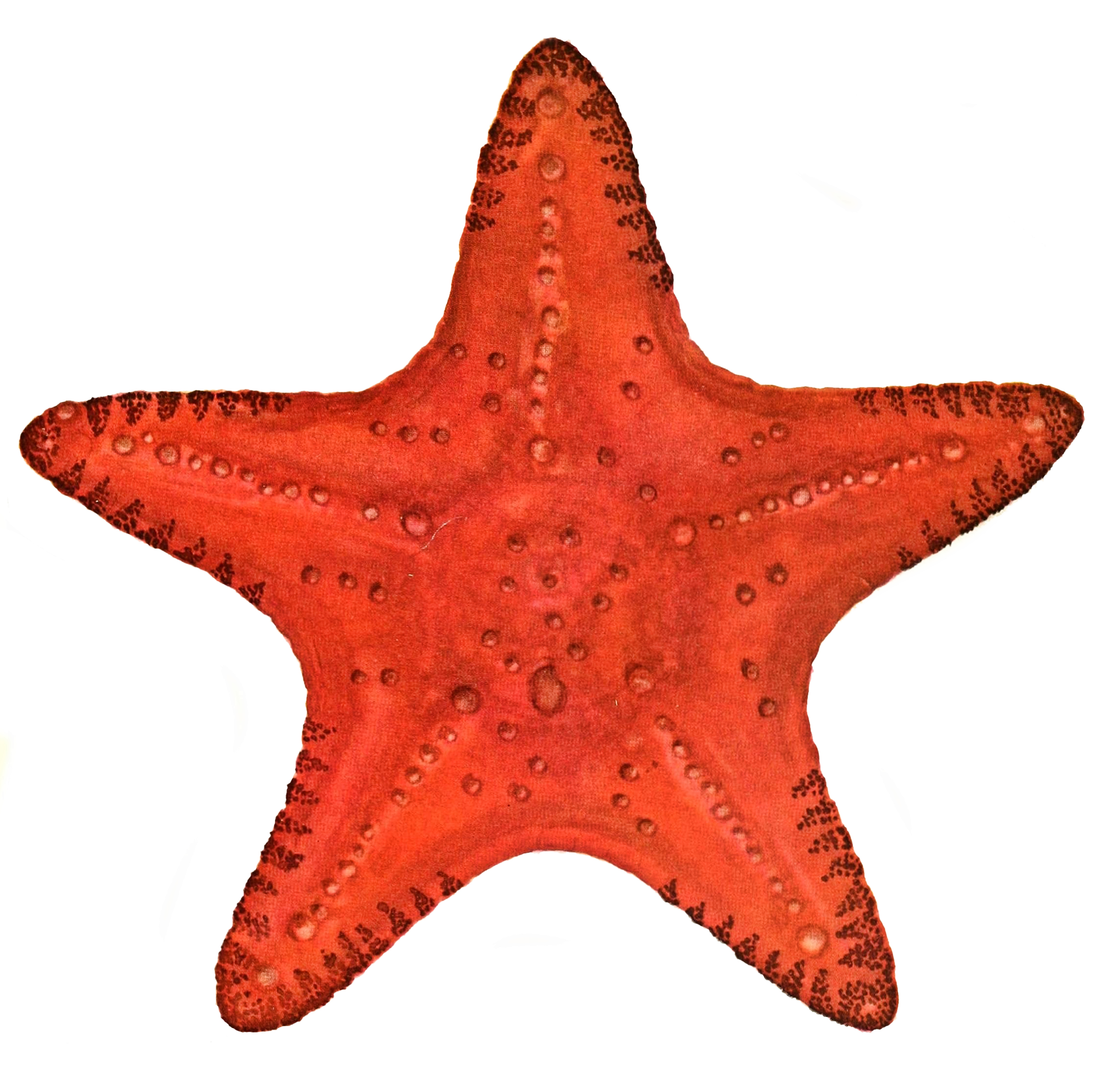

Scientific classification
- Kingdom: Animalia
- Phylum: Echinodermata
- Class: Asteroidea
- Order: Valvatida
- Family: Oreasteridae
- Genus: Pseudoreaster; Verrill, 1899
- Species: P. obtusangulus

Binomial name
- Pseudoreaster obtusangulus (Lamarck, 1816)

= Pseudoreaster =

Genus of starfishes

Pseudoreaster obtusangulus is a species of sea stars in the family Oreasteridae. It is the sole species in the genus Pseudoreaster. It is found in the eastern Indian Ocean, on the west coast of Australia.
