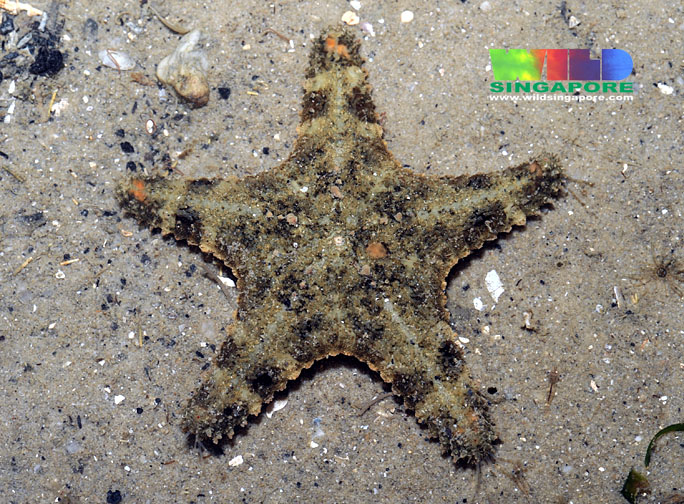
- Spiny sea star (Gymnanthenea laevis)

Scientific classification
- Kingdom: Animalia
- Phylum: Echinodermata
- Class: Asteroidea
- Order: Valvatida
- Family: Oreasteridae
- Genus: Gymnanthenea; H.L. Clark, 1938

Species
- See text.

= Gymnanthenea =

Genus of starfishes

Gymnanthenea is a genus of sea stars in the family Oreasteridae.

== Selected species ==
- Gymnanthenea globigera (Döderlein, 1915)
- Gymnanthenea laevis H.L. Clark, 1938

List source:
