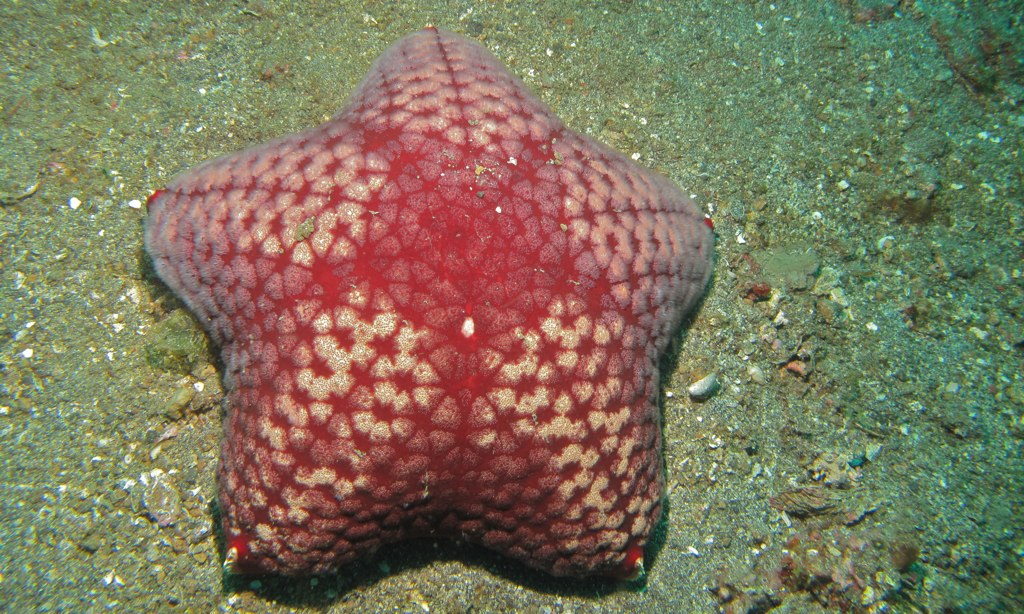

Scientific classification
- Kingdom: Animalia
- Phylum: Echinodermata
- Class: Asteroidea
- Order: Valvatida
- Family: Oreasteridae
- Genus: Halityle; Fisher, 1913
- Species: H. regularis

Binomial name
- Halityle regularis Fisher, 1913

Synonyms
- Culcitaster H.L. Clark, 1915 (A synonym of genus Halityle Fisher, 1913 sec. Fisher (1919))

= Halityle =

Genus of starfishes

Halityle regularis, commonly known as the mosaic cushion star, is a species of sea star in the family Oreasteridae. It is the sole species in the genus Halityle.

== Distribution ==
The mosaic cushion star is found in the Western Central Pacific in countries such as the Philippines. It is found in tropical climates in depths of 3–90 meters.
