= Acheronaster =

Scientific classification
- Kingdom: Animalia
- Phylum: Echinodermata
- Class: Asteroidea
- Order: Valvatida
- Family: Oreasteridae
- Genus: Acheronaster; H.E.S. Clark, 1982
- Species: A. tumidus

Binomial name
- Acheronaster tumidus H.E.S. Clark, 1982

Genus of starfishes

Acheronaster tumidus is a species of sea stars in the family Oreasteridae. It is in the monotypic genus Acheronaster.
