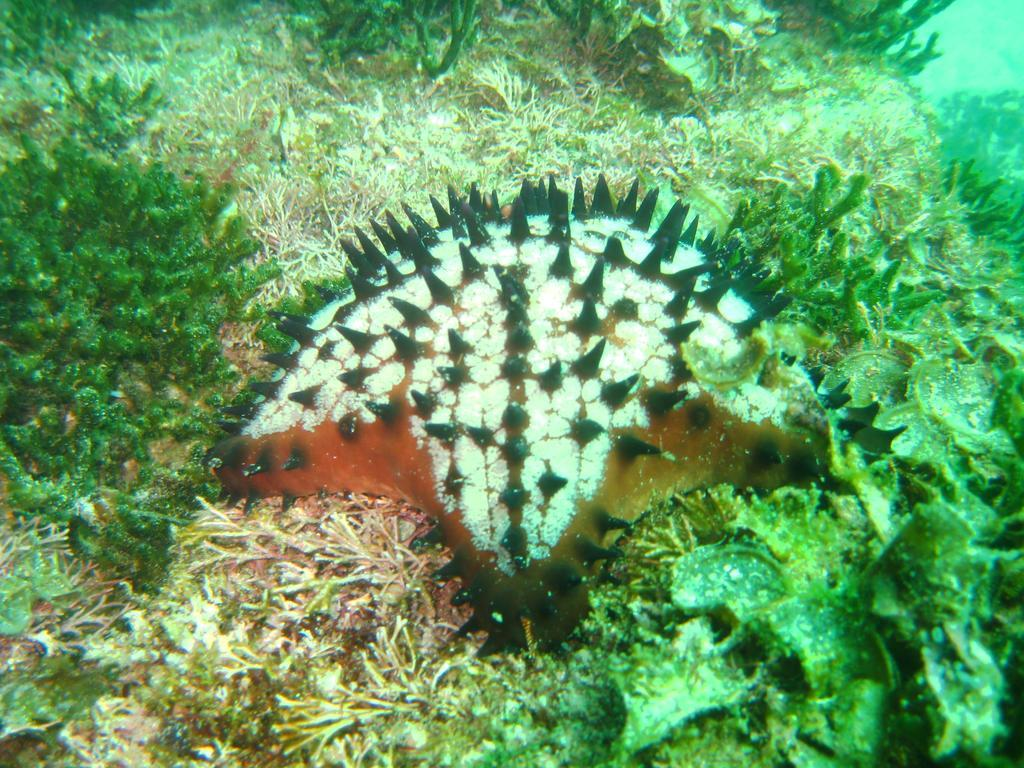
- Nidorellia armata

Scientific classification
- Kingdom: Animalia
- Phylum: Echinodermata
- Class: Asteroidea
- Order: Valvatida
- Family: Oreasteridae
- Genus: Nidorellia; J.E. Gray, 1840
- Species: N. armata

Binomial name
- Nidorellia armata J.E. Gray, 1840

Synonyms
- Goniodiscus armata Lütken, 1859; Goniodiscus conifer Möbius, 1859 (synonym sec. Sladen (1889).); Goniodiscus michelini Perrier, 1869; Goniodiscus stella Verrill, 1870; Nidorellia michelini (Perrier, 1869); Oreaster armatus Müller & Troschel, 1842; Pentaceros armatus J.E.Gray, 1840; List source

= Nidorellia =

Genus of starfishes

Nidorellia armata, also known as the chocolate chip star (leading to easy confusion with Protoreaster nodosus), is a species of starfish from warmer parts of the East Pacific, where it ranges from the Gulf of California to northwest Peru, including the Galápagos. It is the only species in the genus Nidorellia. N. armata can be found in tropical waters clinging on corals and rocky reefs; and are sometimes kept as pets in home marine aquariums.
