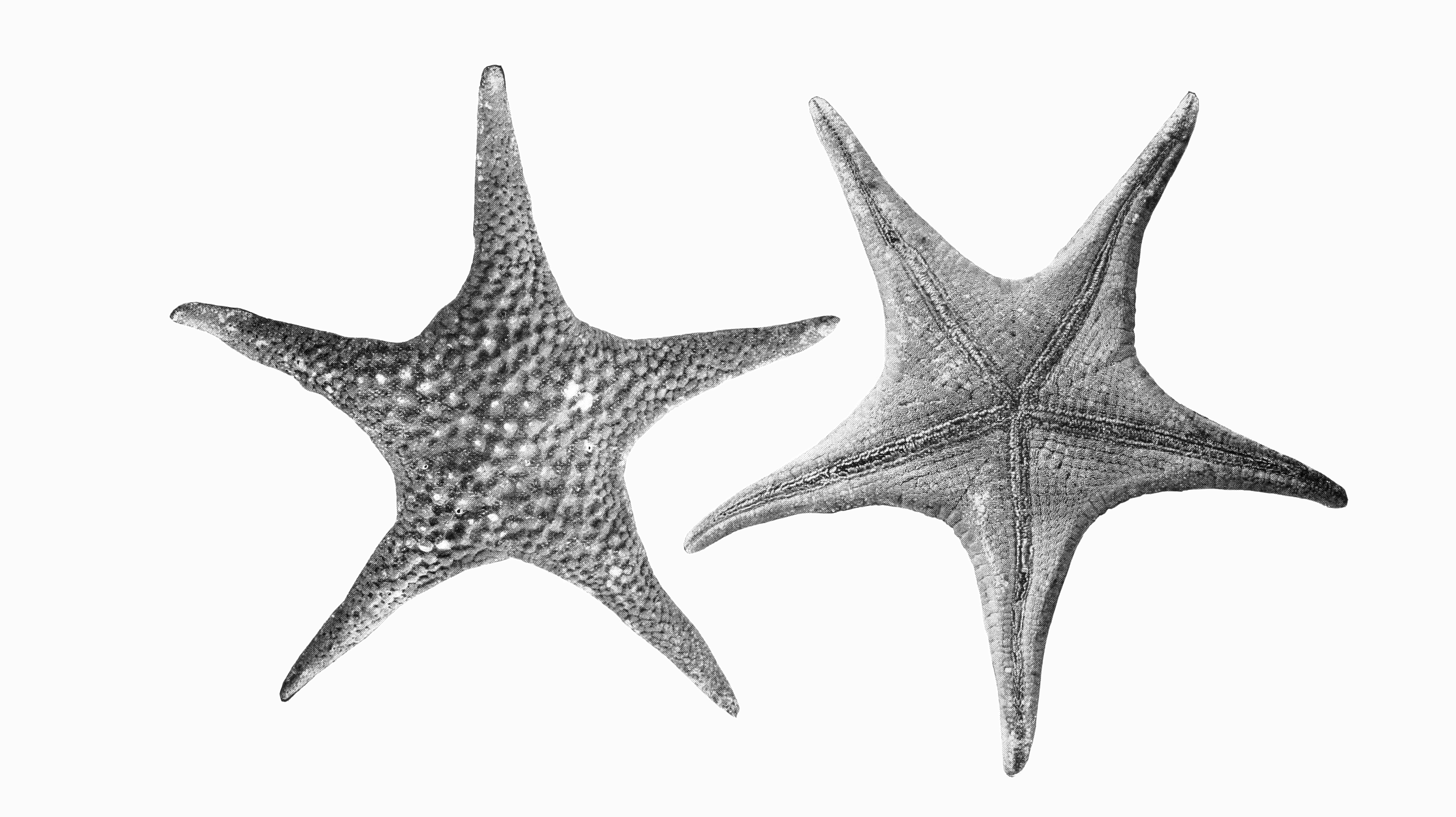

Scientific classification
- Kingdom: Animalia
- Phylum: Echinodermata
- Class: Asteroidea
- Order: Valvatida
- Family: Oreasteridae
- Genus: Nectriaster; H.L. Clark, 1946
- Species: N. monacanthus

Binomial name
- Nectriaster monacanthus H.L. Clark, 1916

= Nectriaster =

Genus of starfishes

Nectriaster monacanthus is a species of sea star in the family Oreasteridae. It is the sole species in the genus Nectriaster. It was first described by Hubert Lyman Clark in 1916 as Mediaster monacanthus.
