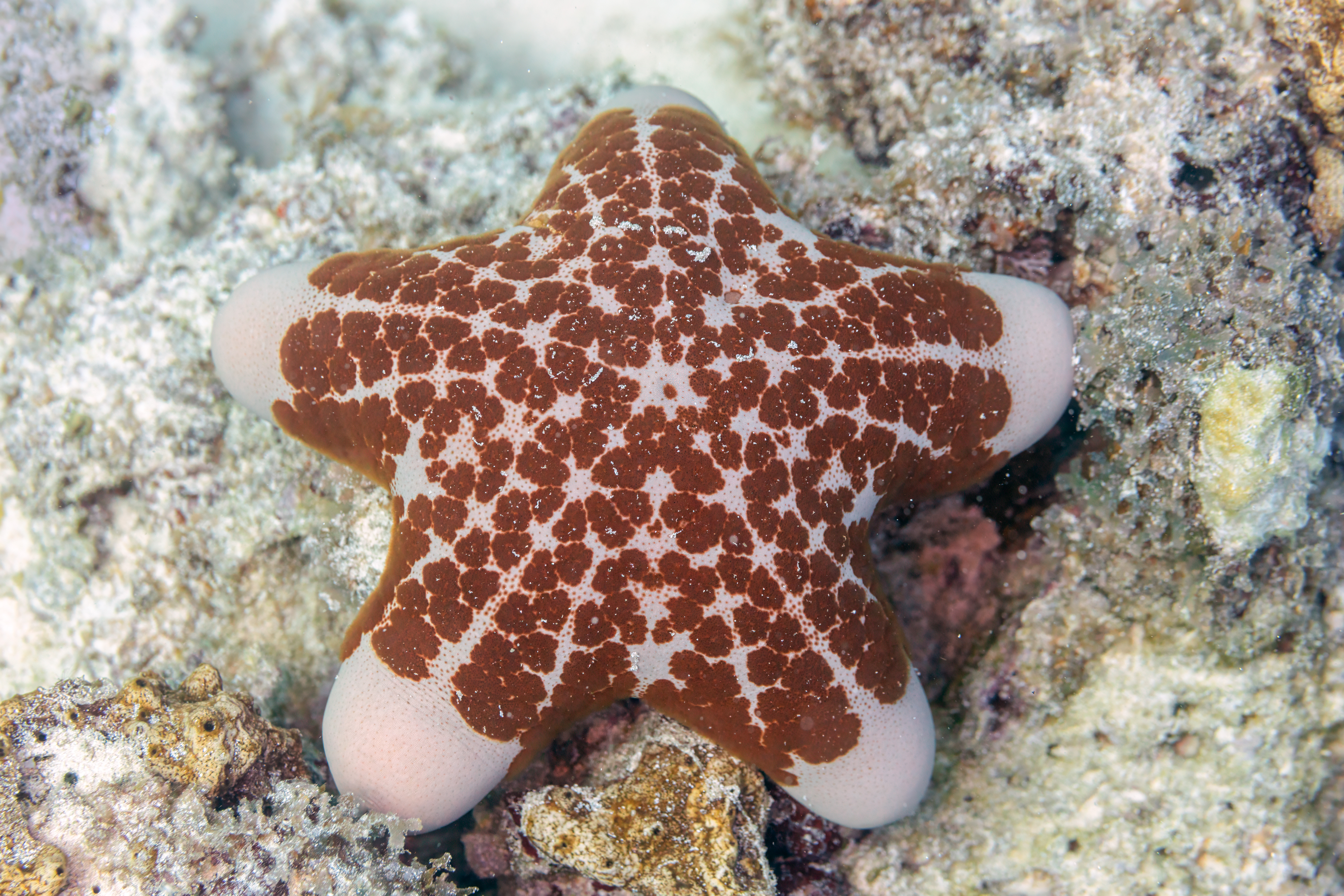

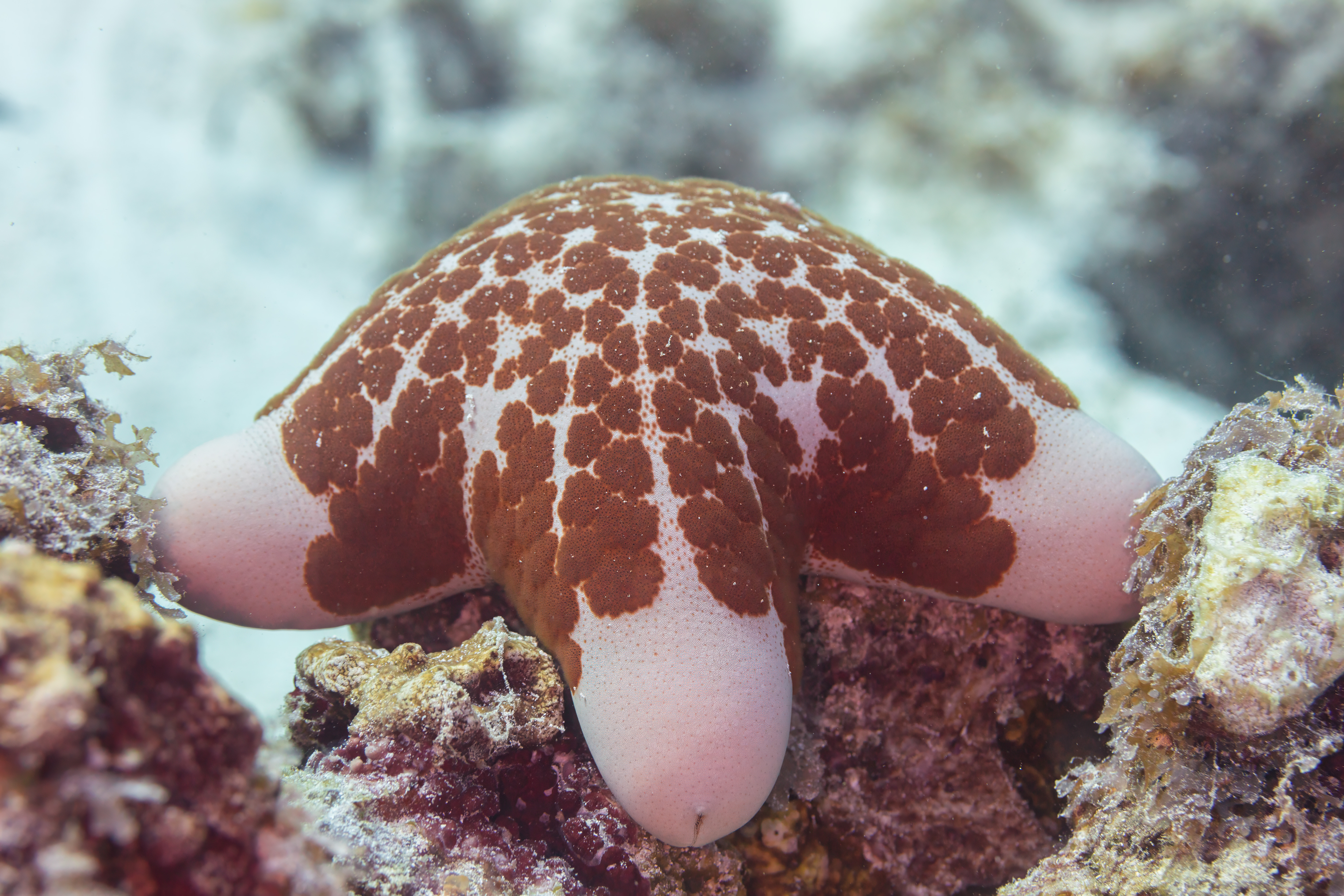

Scientific classification
- Kingdom: Animalia
- Phylum: Echinodermata
- Class: Asteroidea
- Order: Valvatida
- Family: Oreasteridae
- Genus: Choriaster; Lütken, 1869
- Species: C. granulatus

Binomial name
- Choriaster granulatus Lütken, 1869

= Choriaster =

Genus of starfishes

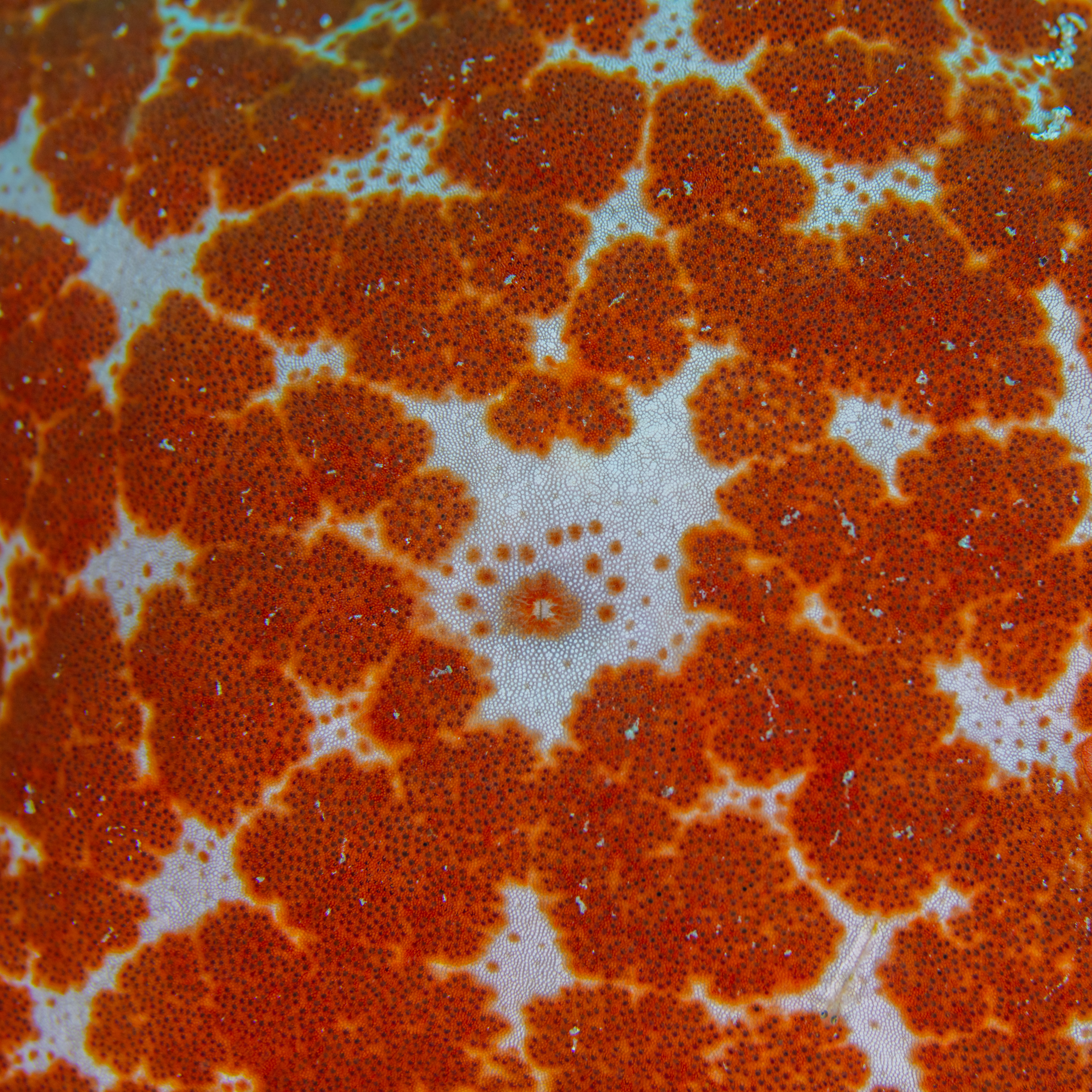
Detail view

Choriaster is a monotypic genus in the family Oreasteridae, containing the single species Choriaster granulatus, commonly known as the granulated sea star. Other common names include big-plated sea star, hunter-five sea star and doughboy starfish.

== Description ==
Choriaster granulatus has a convex body and five short arms with rounded tips. Relatively large in comparison with other sea stars, its maximum radius is about 27 cm (11 in). It is most commonly pale pink in colour with brown papillae radiating out from the centre but can also be colours ranging from grey to yellow and even red.

== Location ==
This species is found in numerous tropical waters, including:

- East Africa
- Indo-Pacific region
- Great Barrier Reef
- Red Sea
- Vanuatu
- Fiji
- Papua New Guinea

== Habitat ==
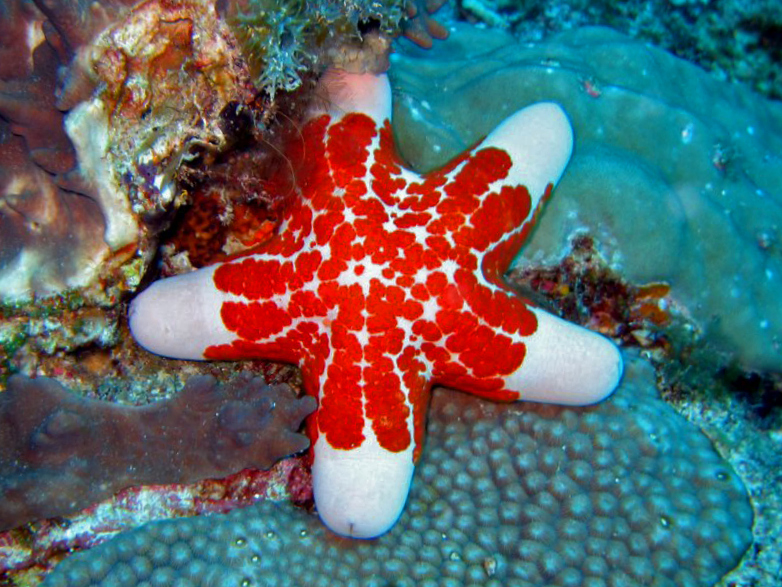
Choriaster granulatus in Madagascar

Choriaster granulatus live individually or in groups along coral reefs in the Indo-West Pacific region, from East Africa all the way to Fiji. They have been found in the Indian Ocean, Red Sea and the Great Barrier Reef. The sandy habitat where it tends to live is characterized by rubble slopes and detritus, also being found living among corals and sea sponges. Choriaster granulatus prefer shallow waters ranging from 1.5 to 53 m (5 to 174 ft) deep and above average temperatures of 24 to 29 °C (75 to 84 °F).

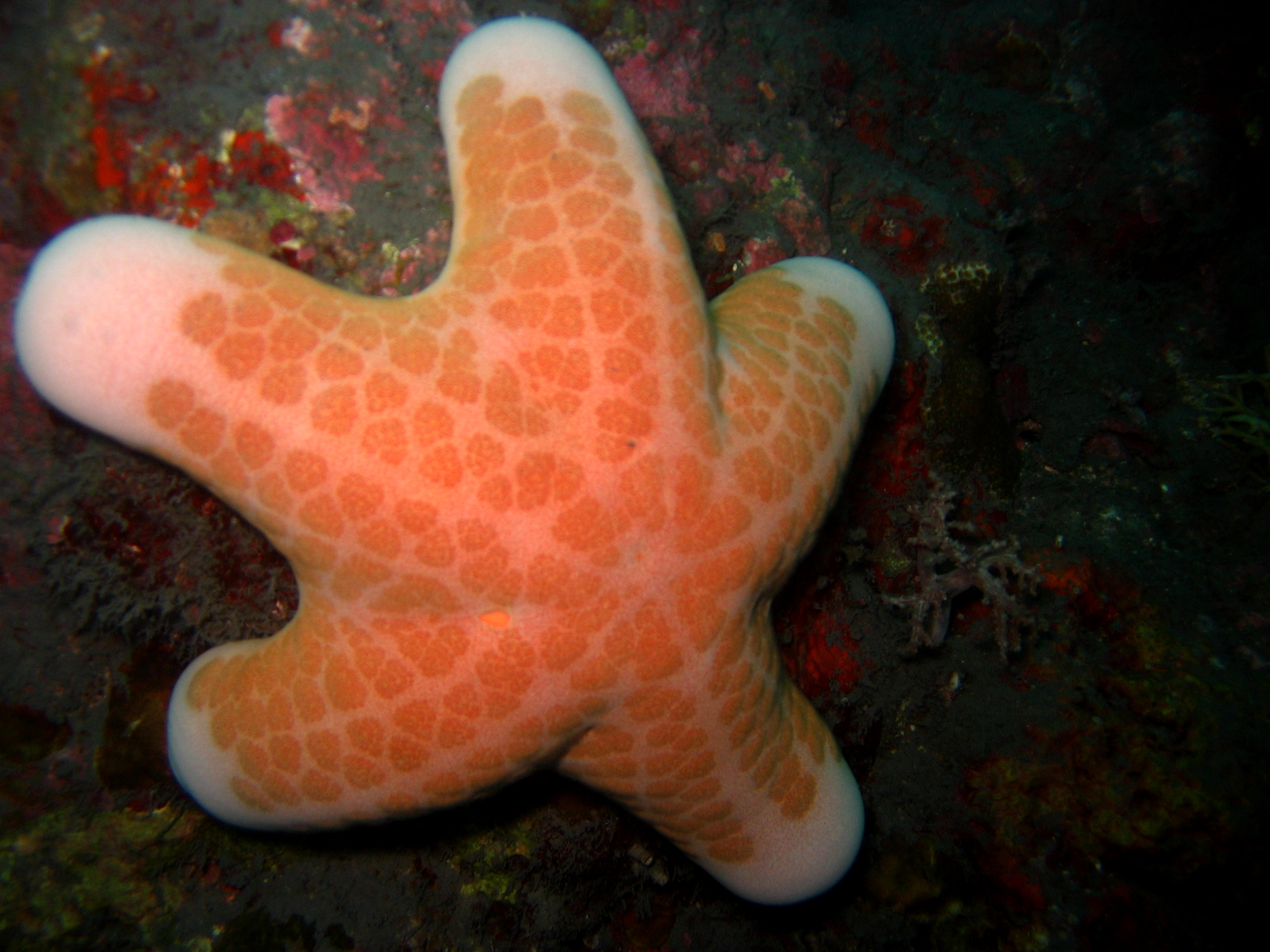
Choriaster granulatus in Occidental Mindoro, Philippines

== Diet ==
Choriaster granulatus is a carnivore that, like other sea stars, has its mouth on the underside of its body. Food is digested and absorbed outside of its body by forcing its stomach out of its mouth onto the food. Its food includes small invertebrates such as coral polyps as well as carrion.

== Life cycle and reproduction ==
Sea star embryos hatch into planktonic larvae before becoming juvenile sea stars with five arms. The Asteroidea class of organisms reproduce both asexually and sexually.

== Threats ==
The arms of Choriaster granulatus can become deformed when small parasitic limpets attach to their underside. They are also threatened by habitat loss due to ocean acidification which can lead to coral bleaching.
