= Ludwig Heinrich Philipp Döderlein =

German zoologist (1855–1936)

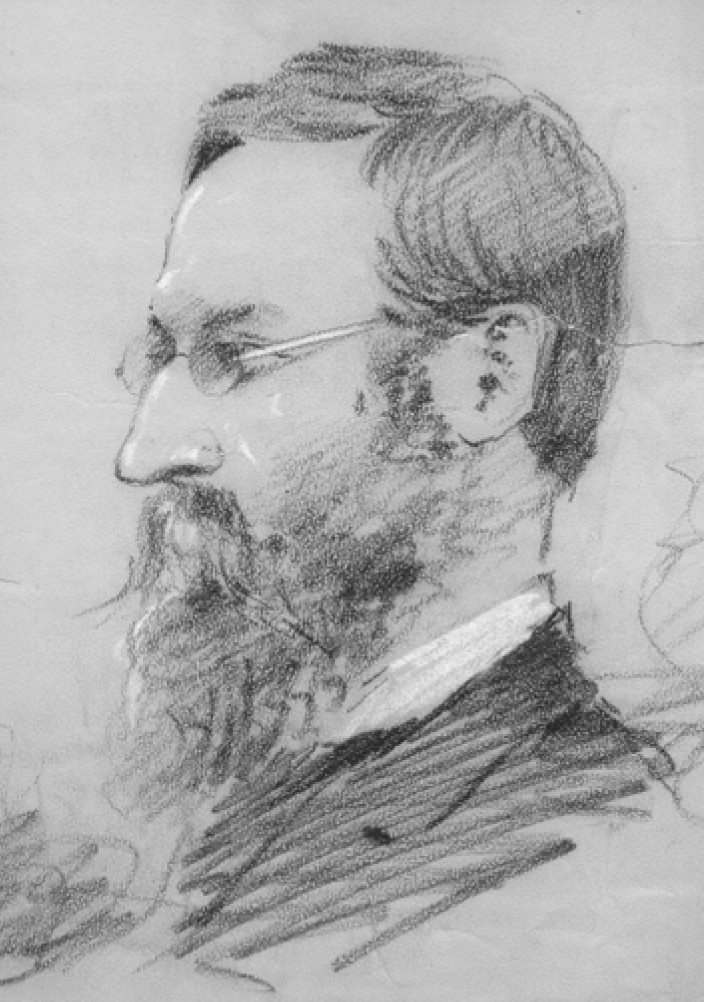
- Born: March 3, 1855; Bad Bergzabern, Kingdom of Bavaria, German Confederation
- Died: April 23, 1936 (aged 81); Munich, Germany
- Education: University of Erlangen-Nuremberg; LMU Munich; University of Strasbourg
- Scientific career
- Fields: Zoology
- Workplaces: University of Tokyo; Musée zoologique de la ville de Strasbourg; Zoologische Staatssammlung München; LMU Munich
- Author abbrev. (zoology): Döderlein

Ludwig Heinrich Philipp Döderlein (3 March 1855 – 23 April 1936) was a German zoologist. He specialized in echinoderms, particularly sea stars, sea urchins, and crinoids. He was one of the first European zoologists to have the opportunity to do research work in Japan from 1879 to 1881. Today, he is considered one of the most important pioneers of marine biological research in Japan.

He was the director and curator of the Musée zoologique de la ville de Strasbourg from 1882 to 1919. He headed the Zoologische Staatssammlung München from 1923 to 1927 and was Professor of Zoology at the Ludwig-Maximilians-Universität München (LMU Munich).

== Biography ==
Ludwig Döderlein was born in Bad Bergzabern, then Kingdom of Bavaria, on March 3, 1855. He went to school in Bayreuth from 1864 to 1873. From 1873 to 1875 he studied natural sciences in the University of Erlangen, where he also worked as an assistant to the Zoologist Emil Selenka in the summer of 1875. From 1875 to 1876 he took two semesters at LMU Munich.

After graduating, Döderlein moved to the University of Straßburg. There he completed his Doctorate of Philosophy in Mathematics and Natural Sciences on June 26, 1877. From 1876 to 1878 he worked for four semesters in the zoology department of the University of Straßburg as an assistant to the German zoologist and phycologist Eduard Oscar Schmidt.

The prospects for an academic career were poor, so for a time, he worked as a schoolteacher in the Alsatian town of Mulhouse. There he met and befriended the Japanese student Kenji Oosawa (1852–1927), who was studying medicine and physiology at the University of Strasbourg. Oosawa arranged for Döderlein to be invited to Japan to work as a Professor of Natural History in the Faculty of Medicine of the newly established University of Tokyo. Döderlein accepted gratefully.

Döderlein was one of the first European academics invited to Japan during the Meiji Restoration era, when Japan was undergoing rapid modernization after the end of the isolation period (Sakoku). He stayed from 1879 to 1881 as an oyatoi gaikokujin ("foreign employee") professor. During this time, he collected and preserved marine life extensively, particularly fish, sponges, crustaceans, crinoids, sea urchins, cnidarians, and bryozoans. In addition, he also occasionally collected specimens of amphibians (including a giant salamander), mammals, birds, and plants. At first, he obtained most of his specimens from the fish markets and gift shops of Tokyo and the island of Enoshima. Later, he himself fished for specimens directly from Sagami Bay.

[I] bought a great number of things: ... Euplectella and some other sorts of glass-sponges, ... Cidaris papillata, crayfish, gorgonians, etc. I asked the people to collect these kinds of things for me as I would come back next month. I had to buy a big basket in order to take all of it with me. I collected various things on the beach and also, took with me some living specimens in big glasses ... There is hardly anyone who doesn't leave that lovely island [of Enoshima] without having bought a souvenir from the stalls to take it home. The zoologist can use those shops to gain best profit from them. Here he can buy what any zoological museum is lacking and ardently wishing for at a very low price ...

— Translated excerpt from Döderlein's unpublished diary, dated April 1881

At the end of the two-year period, Döderlein returned to Europe. Despite the difficulties associated with it, he brought his extensive collection of more than 3,550 specimens of at least 372 species back with him. After his return, Döderlein became the director and curator of Musée zoologique de la ville de Strasbourg between 1882 and 1919. There he devoted much of his life cataloging its rich collection of marine fauna from the Far East. During his tenure, he hired specialists like Johannes Thiele, Franz Eilhard Schulze, and Arnold Edward Ortmann to study his Japanese collection. He also taught zoology at the University of Strasbourg during this period.

At the turn of the century, he developed severe symptoms of tuberculosis. As a result, he was denied a promotion to Professor of Zoology because he could no longer teach effectively. From January to May 1901, in an effort to cure his ailment, he travelled to Biskra in Algeria where he spent most of his time studying the local fauna.

After the end of the First World War in 1919, Alsace was ceded back to France by Germany under the Treaty of Versailles. Döderlein was removed from directorship of the Museum of Strasbourg and was deported back to Germany by the French government. His family were not allowed to take anything with them per the treaty, forcing him to leave all his private property as well as his Japanese zoological collection behind. To make matters worse, Germany (then under the Weimar Republic) was struggling from the post-war economic depression.

Auch zur Fortsetzung meiner wissenschaftlichen Arbeiten komme ich kaum, obwohl ich fast täglich mich im Museum beschäftige. Es ist das Unglück unseres armen Vaterlandes, das alle Gedanken in Anspruch nimmt, und dessen Folgen sich in immer fürchterlicher Weise auch bei mir geltend machen.

Translation: I am also finding hardly any time to continue with my scientific work, even though I work at the museum (n.b.: Zoologische Staatssammlung München) almost every day. The misery of our poor nation occupies all thoughts, and its effects are making themselves felt in ever more frightening ways in my life too.

— Excerpt from a letter to Dr. Adolf Burr in Strasbourg from Ludwig Döderlein, dated 20 April 1922

He spent the rest of his life heading the Zoologische Staatssammlung München (Bavarian State Collection of Zoology) and teaching zoology at LMU. He made numerous attempts to recover his Japanese collection but despite strong international support (including from the Smithsonian) he had little success. He also attempted to visit Strasbourg personally but was again thwarted by the growing hostility between Germany and France prior to the Second World War. He died in Munich on April 23, 1936, at the age of 81.

== Legacy ==
Döderlein is considered as one of the last "great naturalists". His published work were varied, including papers on evolution, tapirs, elephants, and even pterosaurs. Most of his work, however, was on marine biology, with a special interest in echinoderms. He was mostly forgotten during the mid-Twentieth century until the rediscovery of his extensive collections at the Musée zoologique de la ville de Strasbourg by the Japanese marine biologist Shunsuke Mawatari. From 1997 to 2005, a Japanese team documented his collections in Strasbourg and other museums in Austria, Germany, and Switzerland, revealing the true extent of his work. He is now recognized as one of the pioneers of natural history research in Japan. He also started the long tradition of focused research on the ecologically rich Sagami Bay. His observations on its fauna is believed to have been the primary reason for the establishment of the Misaki Marine Biological Station in Sagami Bay in 1884 by the Japanese zoologist Kakichi Mitsukuri.

Döderlein is commemorated in the scientific name of a species of Asian snake, Calamaria doederleini and in the fish genus Doederleinia.

== See also ==
- Category:Taxa named by Ludwig Heinrich Philipp Döderlein
