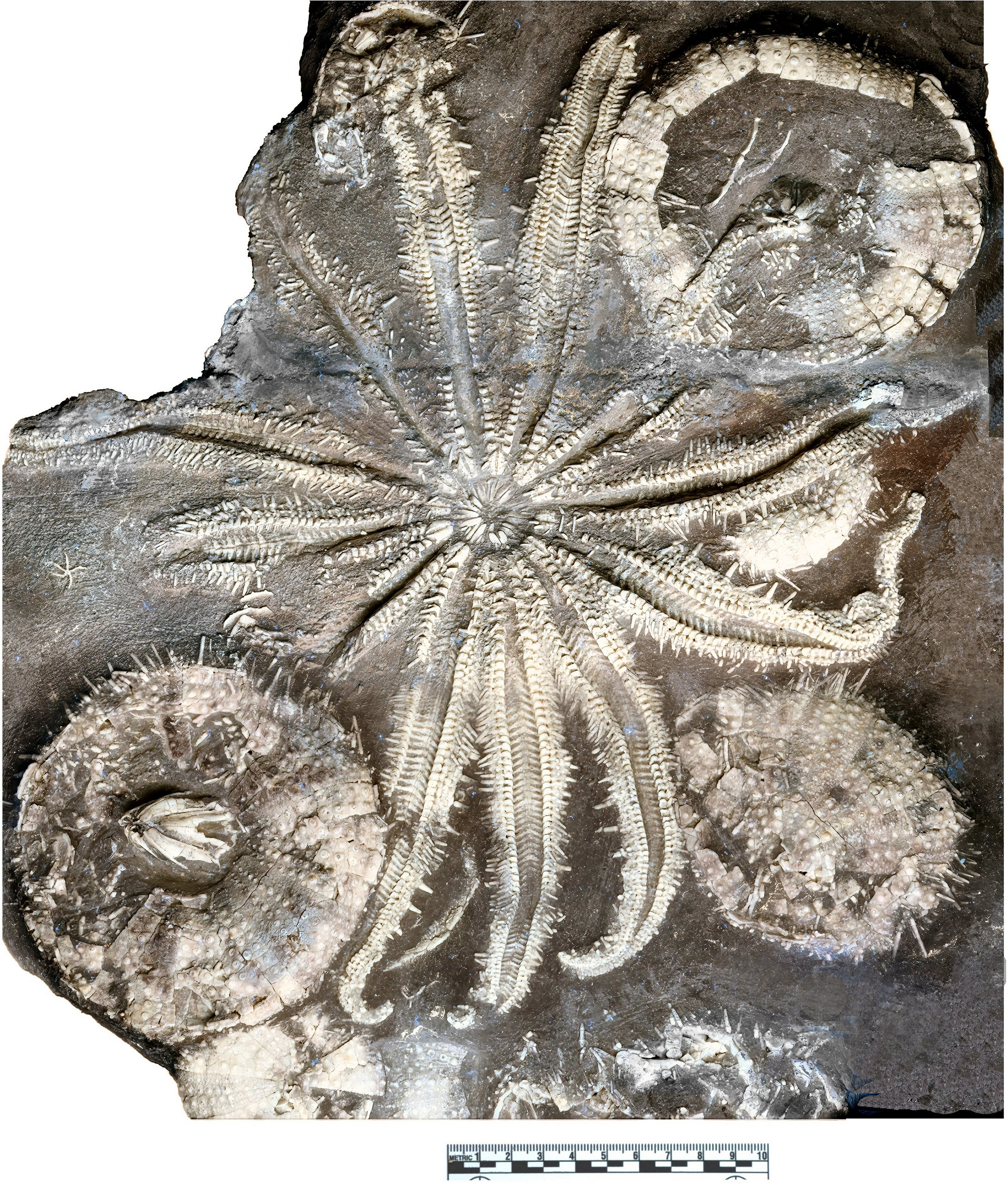
- Holotype under UV light, with associated sea urchins

Scientific classification
- Kingdom: Animalia
- Phylum: Echinodermata
- Class: Asteroidea
- Order: Valvatida
- Family: Solasteridae
- Genus: †Lacosteaster; Gale & Ward, 2024
- Species: †L. lauerorum

Binomial name
- †Lacosteaster lauerorum Gale & Ward, 2024

= Lacosteaster =

Lacosteaster Temporal range: Early Miocene, late Burdigalian

Genus of extinct sea star

Lacosteaster (lit. 'Lacoste star') is an extinct genus of sea star in the family Solasteridae, known from the Early Miocene Calcaire de Ménerbes Formation of France. The genus contains a single species, Lacosteaster lauerorum, known from several well-preserved specimens. It is characterized by an array of twelve arms radiating from the central disc. Lacosteaster is part of a remarkably diverse assemblage of sea stars—also including Astropecten, Cruciformaster, and Menerbesaster, each a member of a different family—representing the first such 'biological snapshot' from the Miocene of Western Europe.

== Discovery and naming ==
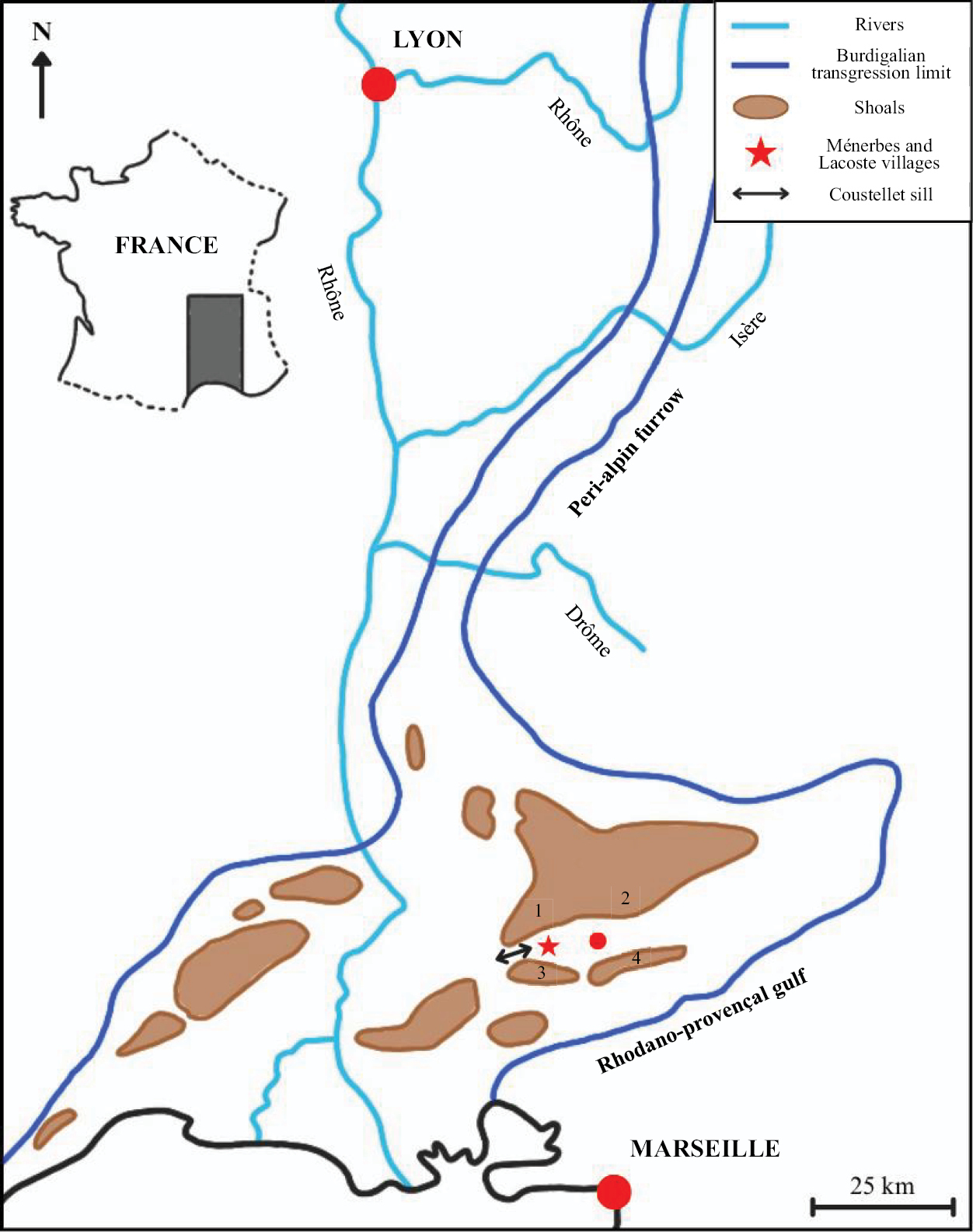
Map of relevant outcrops in France; Lacosteaster is known from near 3 (Petit Luberon)

The first described Lacosteaster fossil material was likely discovered in the Soubeyran quarry, representing outcrops of the Calcaire de Ménerbes Formation near the village of Ménerbes in southeastern France. These rocks are part of the Lacoste plateau, north of the Lesser Luberon Massif. Since this specimen was purchased after its discovery, the exact discovery locality is unknown. The known individual is well-preserved and nearly complete, preserved with the actinal face (side containing the mouth) up, on a limestone slab. This block also preserves six fossil specimens of Tripneustes, a 'regular echinoid' (symmetrical, globular sea urchin). This specimen is housed as part of the Lauer Foundation in Illinois, United States, under the specimen number LF 4905.

In 2024, Andrew S. Gale and David J. Ward described Lacosteaster lauerorum as a new genus and species of solasterid sea star based on these fossil remains, establishing LF 4905 as the holotype specimen. The generic name, Lacosteaster, combines a reference to the type locality in Lacoste with the Latin aster, meaning 'star', a common suffix used in the generic names of sea stars. The specific name, lauerorum, honours Bruce and René Lauer, the founders of the Lauer Foundation for Paleontology, which holds the holotype specimen. Lacosteaster is the second fossil member of the family Solasteridae to be described, following Plesiosolaster moretonis, known from the Middle Jurassic of the United Kingdom.

In 2026, Anaïs Travers and colleagues published on several additional sea star fossils from the Calcaire de Ménerbes Formation, including twelve new specimens of Lacosteaster. These are permanently accessioned in the Musée des Confluences in Lyon, France. Eight of these specimens were collected from the Soubeyran quarry in Ménerbes, while the locality of the remaining four is unknown. None of the specimens are complete, with eight only preserving pieces of the arms. Five are preserved with their actinal face up, like the holotype, four with their abactinal face (side opposite the mouth) up, and three with both faces exposed.

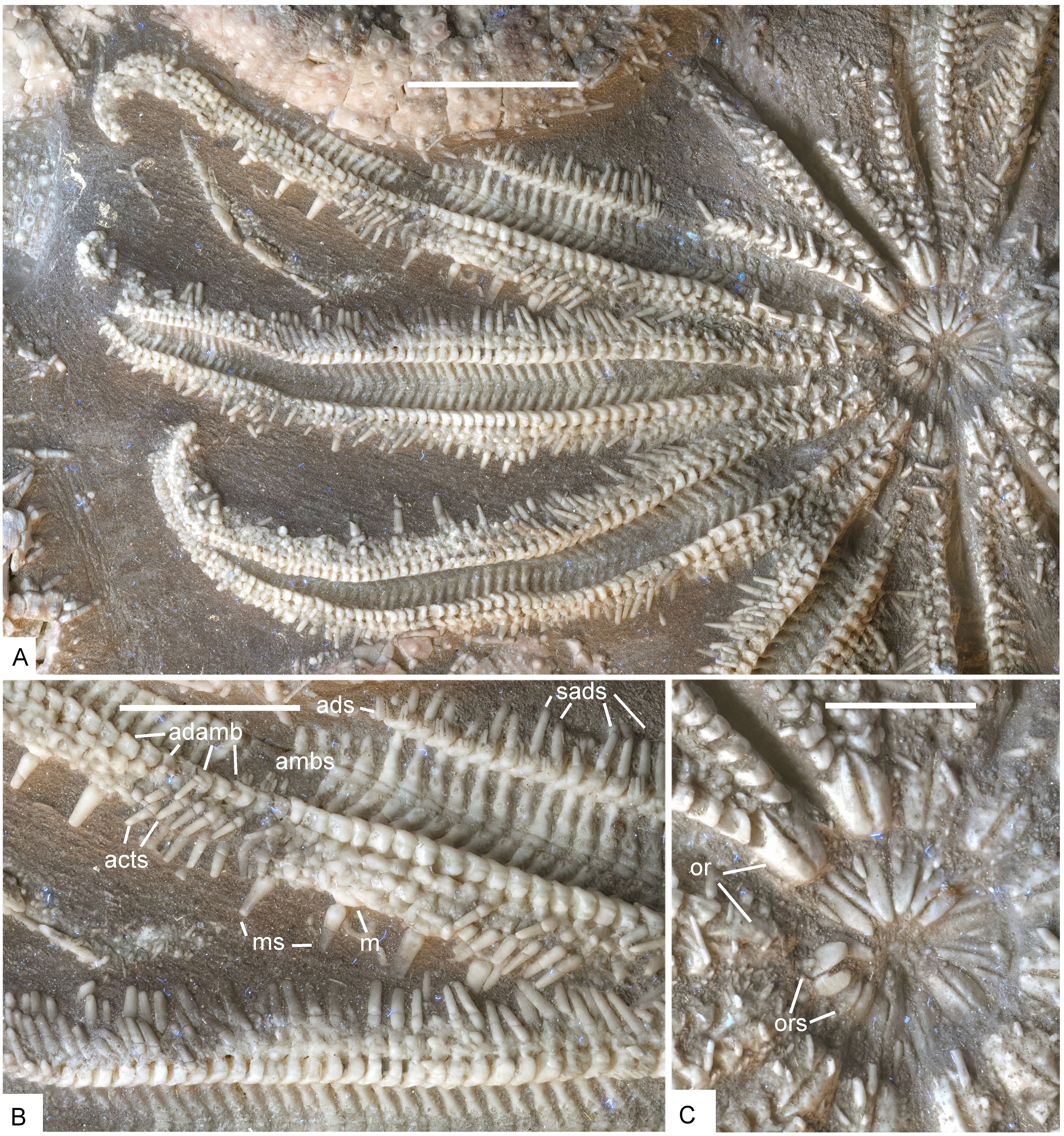
Details of the holotype (arms and mouth)

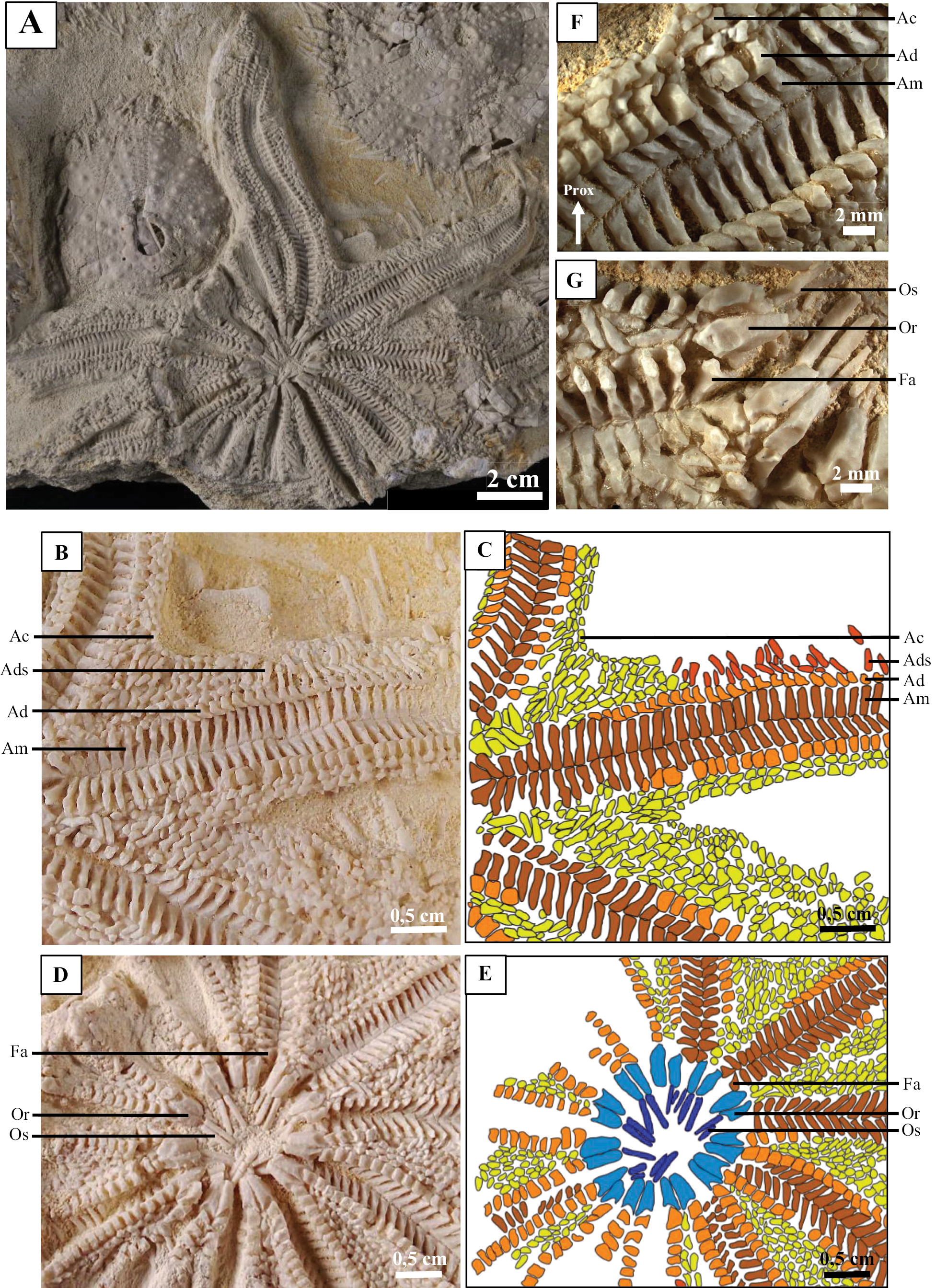
MDC.20062677, a specimen referred to L. lauerorum

== Description ==
Lacosteaster has a proportionately small disc and twelve arms, which quickly taper toward the tip on the last third. Each arm of the holotype individual is about 18 centimetres (7.1 in) long, and bears several rows of small, closely packed spines. The ratio of large radius, R (distance from the center of the disc to the end of an arm) to the small radius, r (distance from the center of the disc to an interbrachial area) is 4.5:1. The large radius ranges between 10 and 17 cm (3.9 and 6.7 in) in the referred specimens. The margin of the mouth comprises an arrangement of small conical spines.

== Palaeoecology ==
The fossil assemblage of the Calcaire de Ménerbes Formation from which Lacosteaster is known is dated to the late Burdigalian age of the early Miocene epoch (Neogene period), about 16 million years ago. These limestone outcrops, representing a shallow marine depositional environment, preserve abundant well-preserved fossil invertebrates, especially echinoderms, molluscs, bryozoans, and algae. These accumulations have been interpreted as representing a sudden, massive mortality event, possibly the aftermath of episodic storms burying the animals. Sea stars are known to be able to escape thin layers of sediment, their fossils are often folded on themselves if burial is slow, in contrast to the flattened preservation style seen in these specimens.

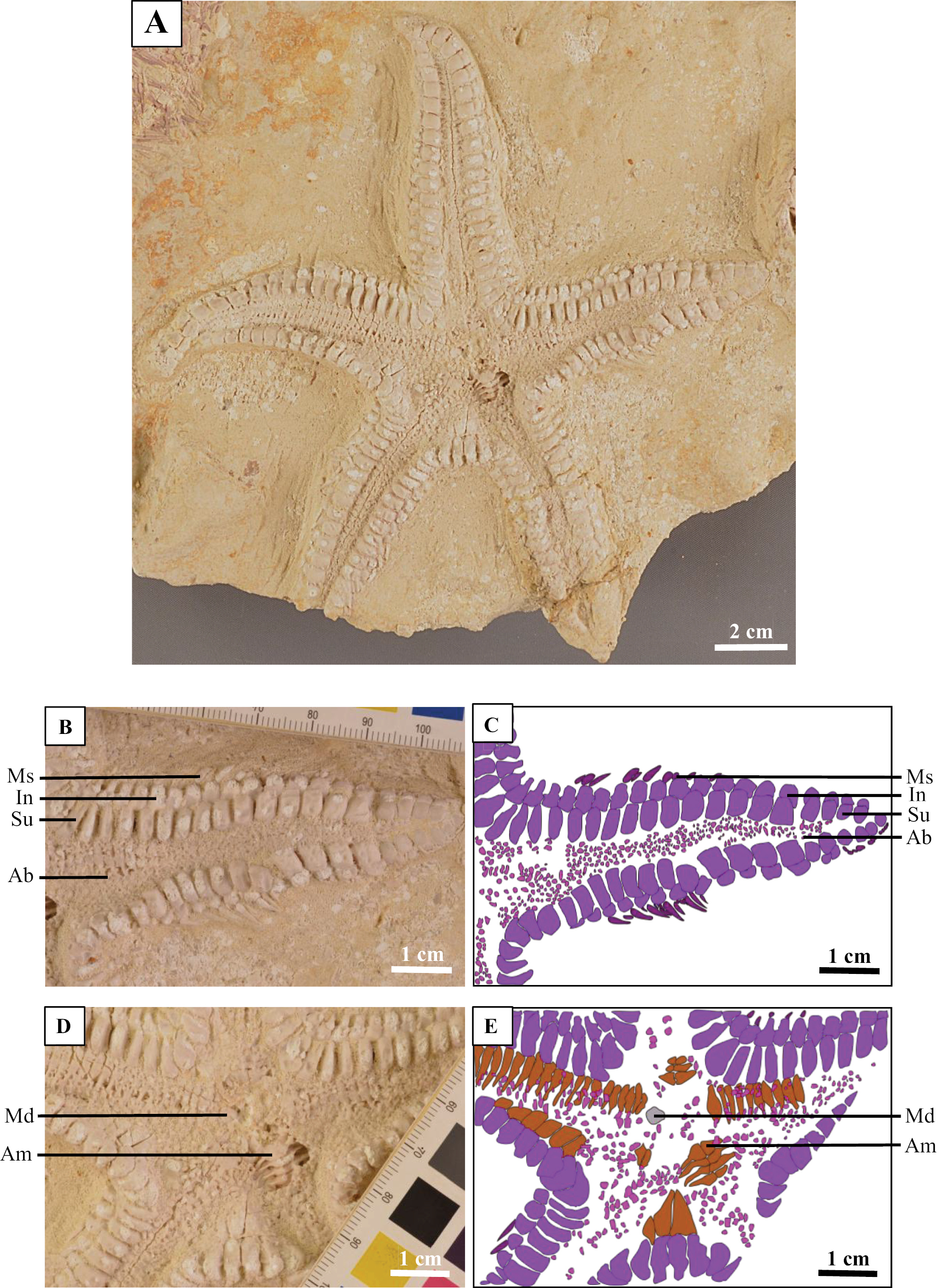
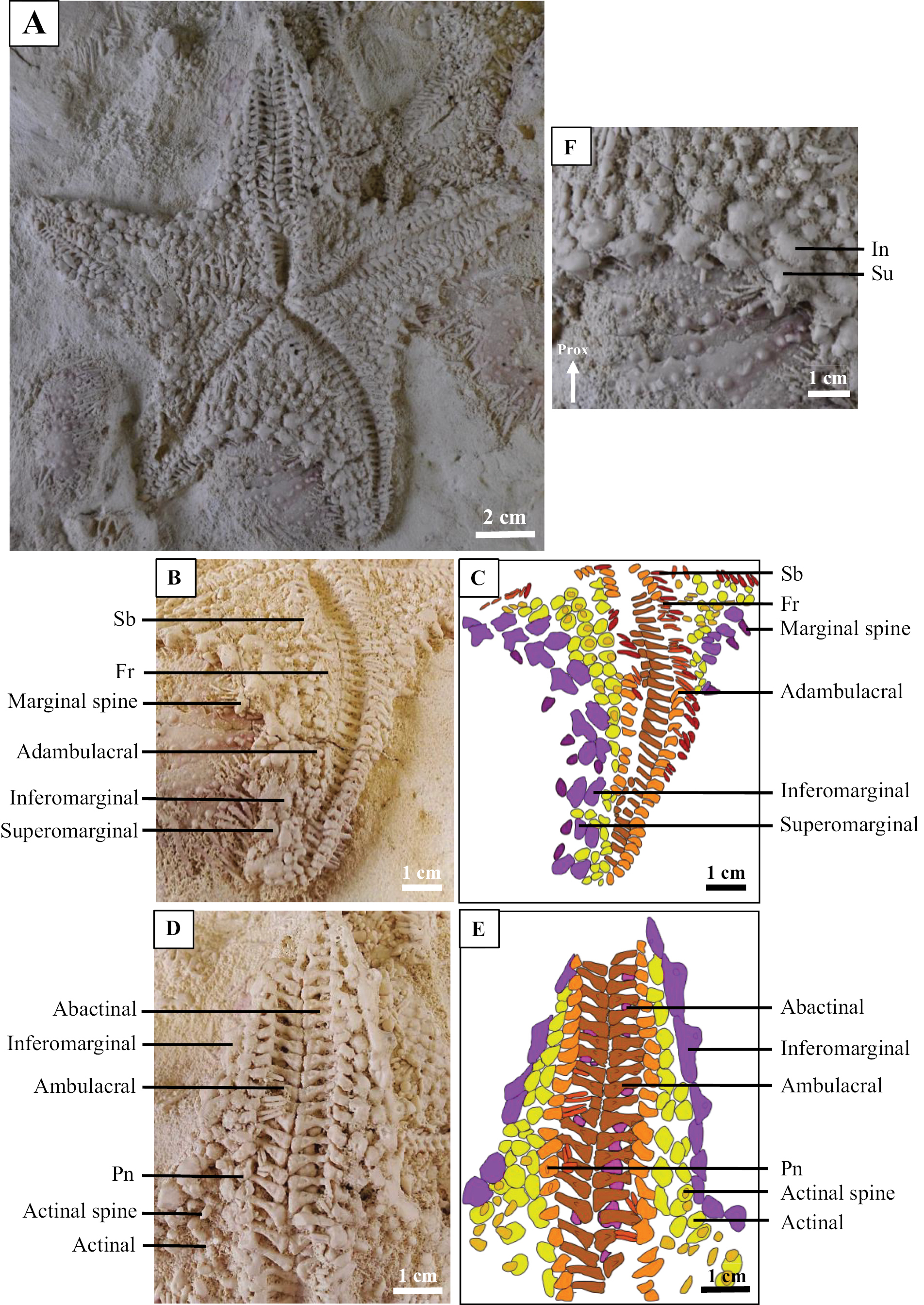
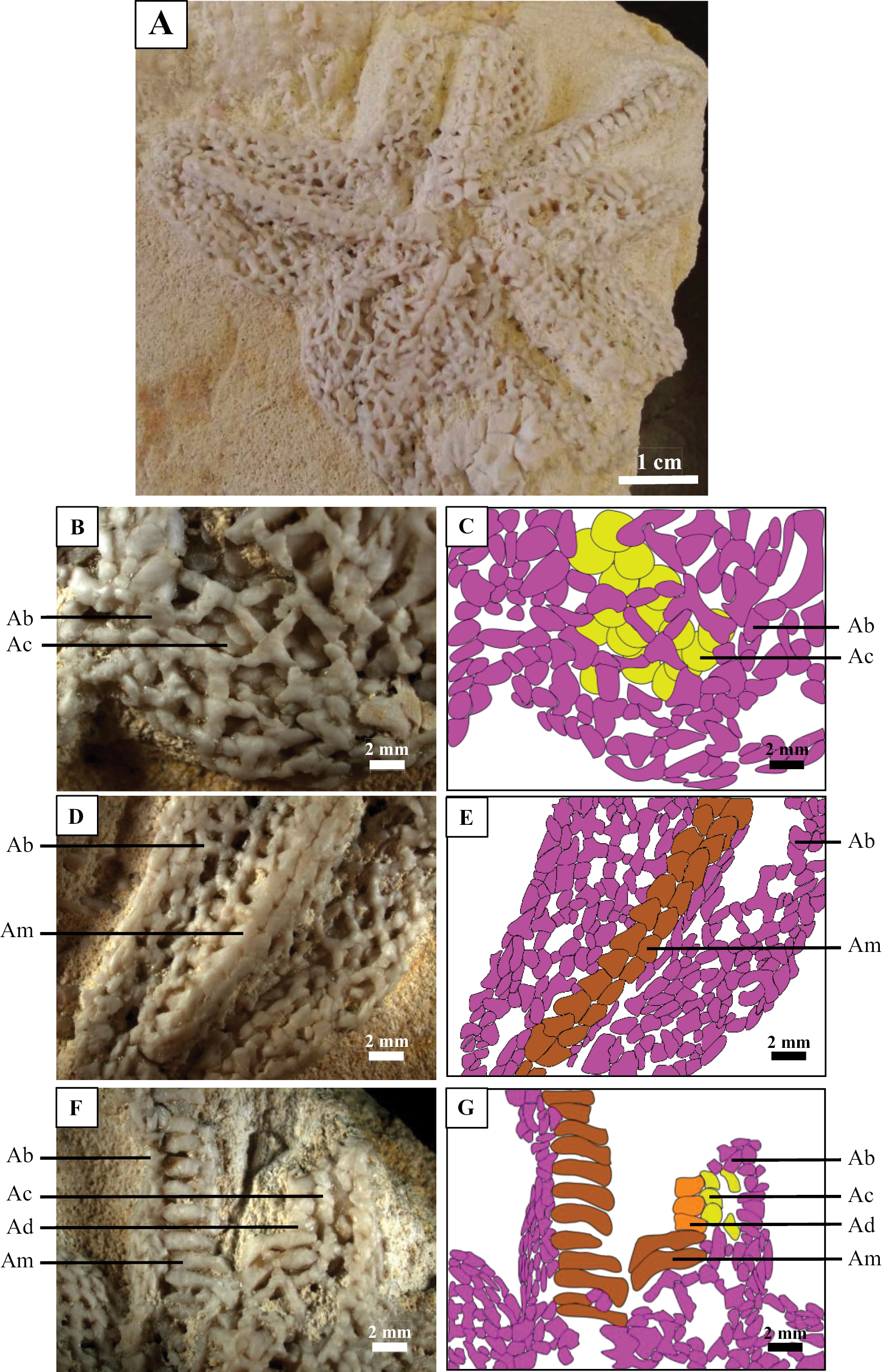
Select Calcaire de Ménerbes sea star specimens:
Astropecten, Cruciformaster, and Menerbesaster

The ossicles of the preserved echinoderms are almost always in anatomical position, which is very rare in the fossil record, further indicating exceptional preservation conditions. Known Calcaire de Ménerbes echinoderms comprise representatives of sea urchins (class Echinoidea), feather stars (Crinoidea), brittle stars (Ophiuroidea), and sea stars (Asteroidea). In addition to Lacosteaster, three other sea stars have been described from this locality. All four taxa belong to different families, highlighting the diversity of sea stars preserved and representing the first described example of a diverse assemblage of Miocene fossil sea stars in Western Europe. A single specimen has been identified as an unnamed species of the extant genus Astropecten (Astropectinidae). Two new taxa were recognized in a 2026 description of the locality's sea star fauna: Cruciformaster pedicellarius (Oreasteridae), known from two individuals preserved on one slab, and Menerbesaster bongrainae (Echinasteridae), known from a single specimen.

Extant members of the starfish clades represented in the Calcaire de Ménerbes Formation are known to inhabit different environments from each other; most extant oreasterids inhabit warm and very shallow (0–100 metres (0–328 ft) deep) environments, solasterids mostly inhabit shallow (0–200 m (0–656 ft)) to upper bathyal (up to 1,000 metres (3,300 ft)) environments depending on the region (boreal or tropical), astropectinids mostly inhabit cold waters but can be found through temperate and tropical regions, and echinasterids inhabit many habitats in cold, temperate, and tropical environments. Extant oreasterids, solasterids, and echinasterids are epibenthic (lifestyle above sediment), while astropectinids are endobenthic (lifestyle burrowed in sediment). As such, members of these families do not generally overlap in modern habitats. The co-occurrence of these four sea star families with presumably very distinct ecologies based on modern analogs suggests they were transported through some natural event, which concentrated them together before their rapid burial.

Modern oreasterids and echinasterids are usually detrivores and predators of small prey. Applying this to the Calcaire de Ménerbes fauna, it is possible that Cruciformaster (an oreasterid) preyed on Tripneustes planus, a species of sea urchin known from the deposits, similar to the modern oreasterid Oreaster reticulatus preying on Tripneustes ventricosus. Modern Astropecten spp. make bivalves one of their two main food sources, so the Astropecten species preserved in the Calcaire de Ménerbes may have fed on juveniles Gigantopecten restitutensis.
