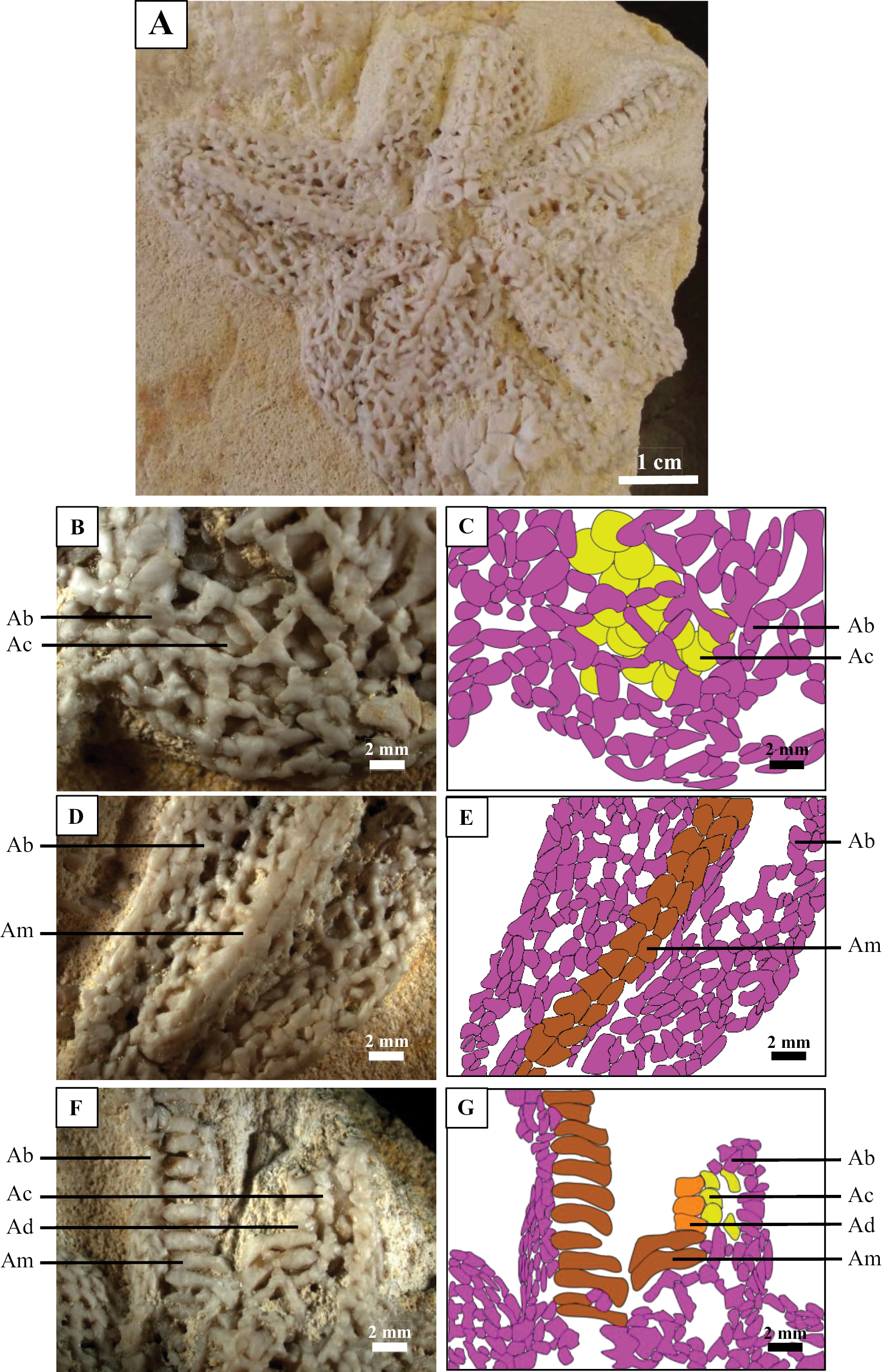
- Holotype and interpretative drawings

Scientific classification
- Kingdom: Animalia
- Phylum: Echinodermata
- Class: Asteroidea
- Order: Spinulosida
- Family: Echinasteridae
- Genus: †Menerbesaster; Travers & Fau, 2026
- Species: †M. bongrainae

Binomial name
- †Menerbesaster bongrainae Travers & Fau, 2026

= Menerbesaster =

Menerbesaster Temporal range: Early Miocene, late Burdigalian

Genus of extinct sea star

Menerbesaster (lit. 'Ménerbes star') is an extinct genus of sea star in the family Echinasteridae, known from the Early Miocene Calcaire de Ménerbes Formation of France. The genus contains a single species, Menerbesaster bongrainae, known from a well-preserved specimen on a limestone slab. Menerbesaster is part of a remarkably diverse assemblage of sea stars—also including Astropecten, Cruciformaster, and Lacosteaster, each a member of a different family—representing the first such 'biological snapshot' from the Miocene of Western Europe.

== Discovery and naming ==
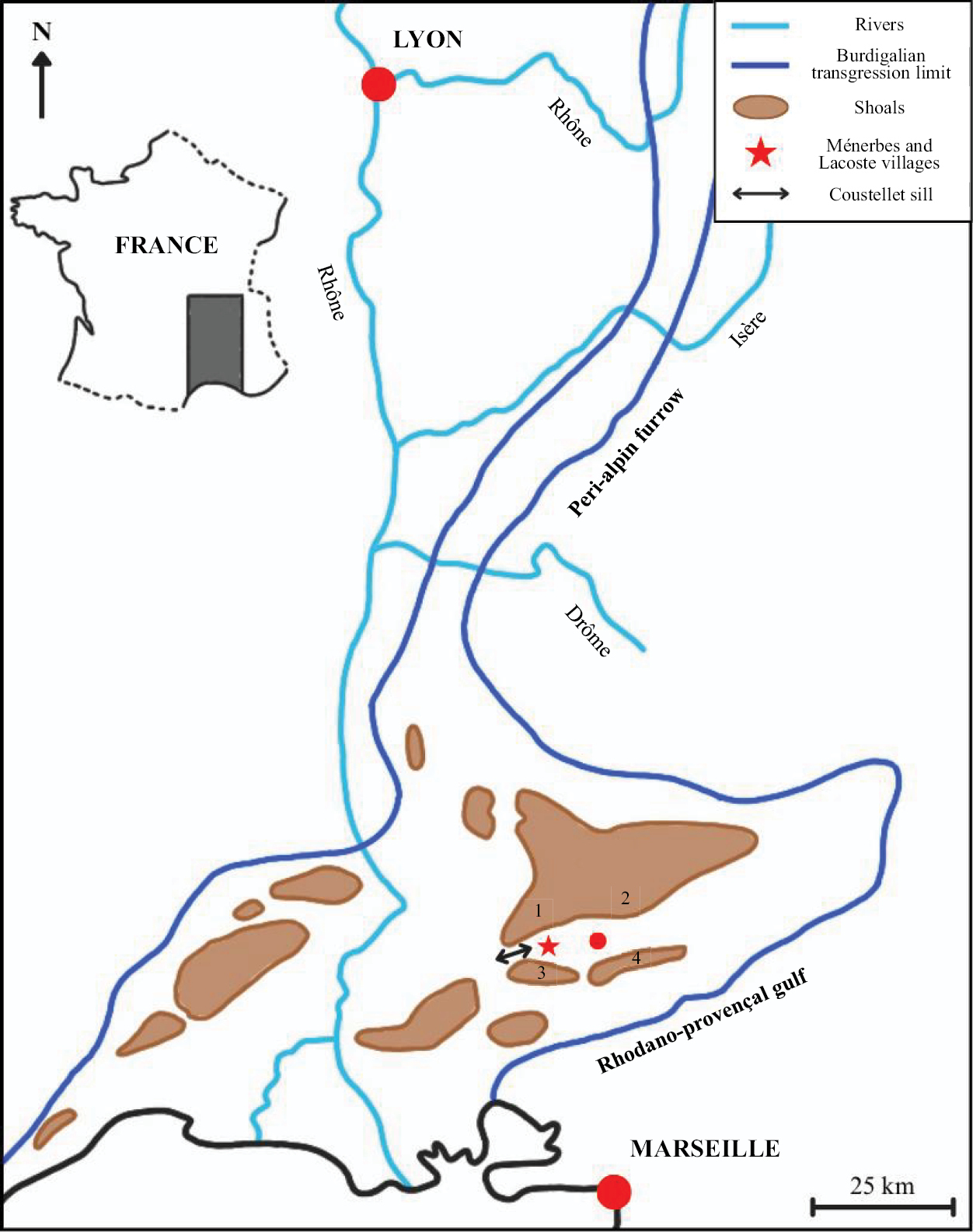
Map of relevant outcrops in France; Menerbesaster is known from near 3 (Petit Luberon)

The Menerbesaster fossil material was discovered in the Soubeyran quarry, representing outcrops of the Calcaire de Ménerbes Formation near the village of Ménerbes in southeastern France. These rocks are part of the Lacoste plateau, north of the Lesser Luberon Massif. One individual is known, preserved with the abactinal face (side opposite the mouth) up, on a limestone slab. This specimen is housed in the Musée des Confluences in Lyon, France, where it is permanently accessioned under the specimen number MDC.20062679.

In 2026, Anaïs Travers and colleagues described Menerbesaster bongrainae as a new genus and species of echinasterid sea star based on these fossil remains, establishing MDC.20062679 as the holotype specimen. The generic name, Menerbesaster, combines a reference to the type locality in Ménerbes with the Latin aster, meaning 'star', a common suffix used in the generic names of sea stars. The specific name, bongrainae, honours Madelaine Bongrain, who published the first palaeoecological research on the echinoderm and bivalve accumulations of the Calcaire de Ménerbes Formation in 2013. Menerbesaster is the second fossil member of the family Echinasteridae to be described, following Echinaster jacobseni, an extinct species of the extant genus Echinaster. E. jacobseni is known from the Eocene of Denmark.

== Description ==
Menerbesaster has five arms, the full extent of which is not preserved in the holotype. The area between each arm is wide and angular. In the holotype, the distance from the center of the disc to the end of an arm (large radius, R) is more than 3.7 centimetres (1.5 in), while the distance from the center of the disc to an interbrachial area (small radius, r) is 1.5 cm (0.59 in).

== Palaeoecology ==
The fossil assemblage of the Calcaire de Ménerbes Formation from which Menerbesaster is known is dated to the late Burdigalian age of the early Miocene epoch (Neogene period), about 16 million years ago. These limestone outcrops, representing a shallow marine depositional environment, preserve abundant well-preserved fossil invertebrates, especially echinoderms, molluscs, bryozoans, and algae. These accumulations have been interpreted as representing a sudden, massive mortality event, possibly the aftermath of episodic storms burying the animals. Sea stars are known to be able to escape thin layers of sediment, their fossils are often folded on themselves if burial is slow, in contrast to the flattened preservation style seen in these specimens.

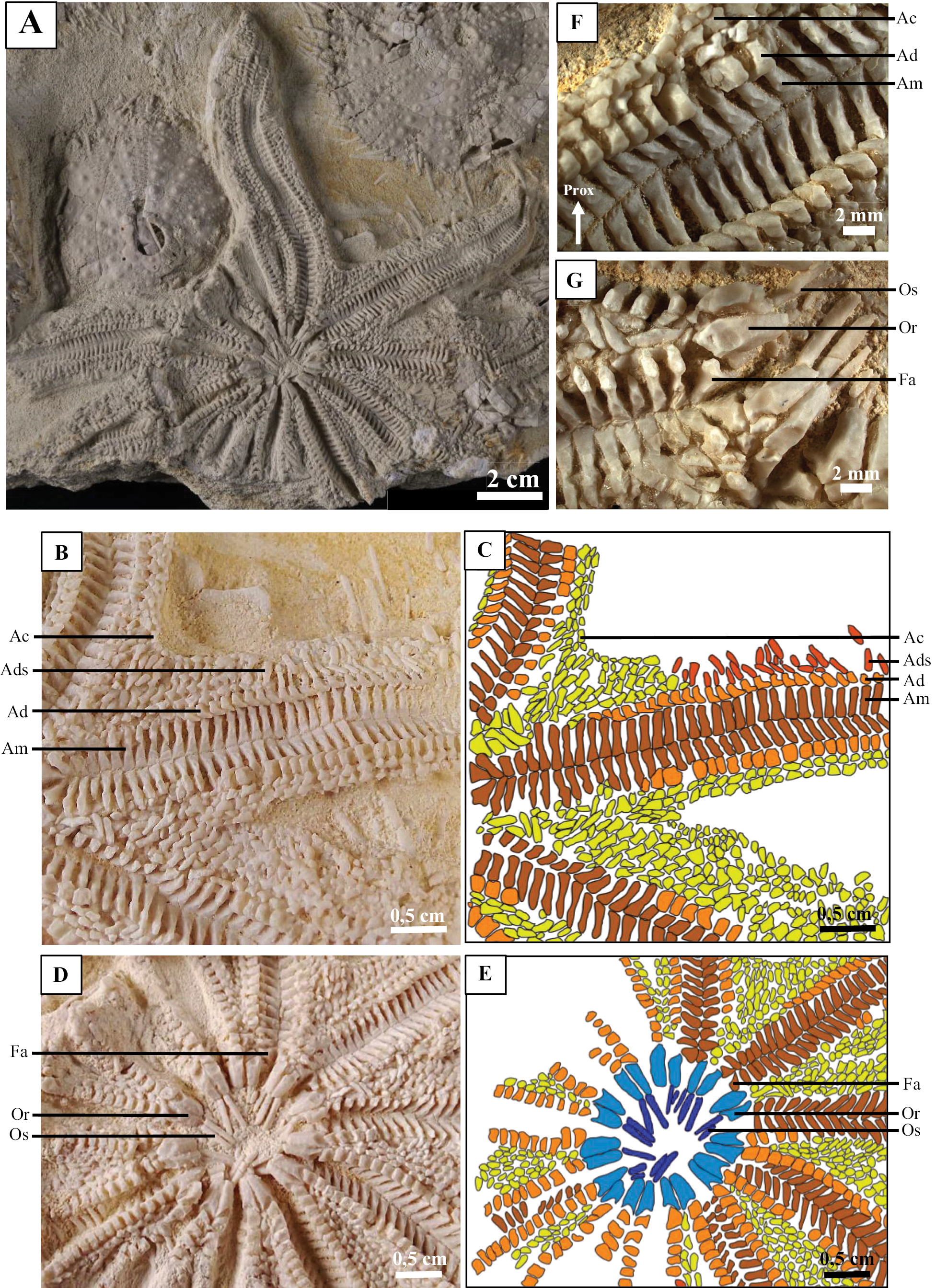
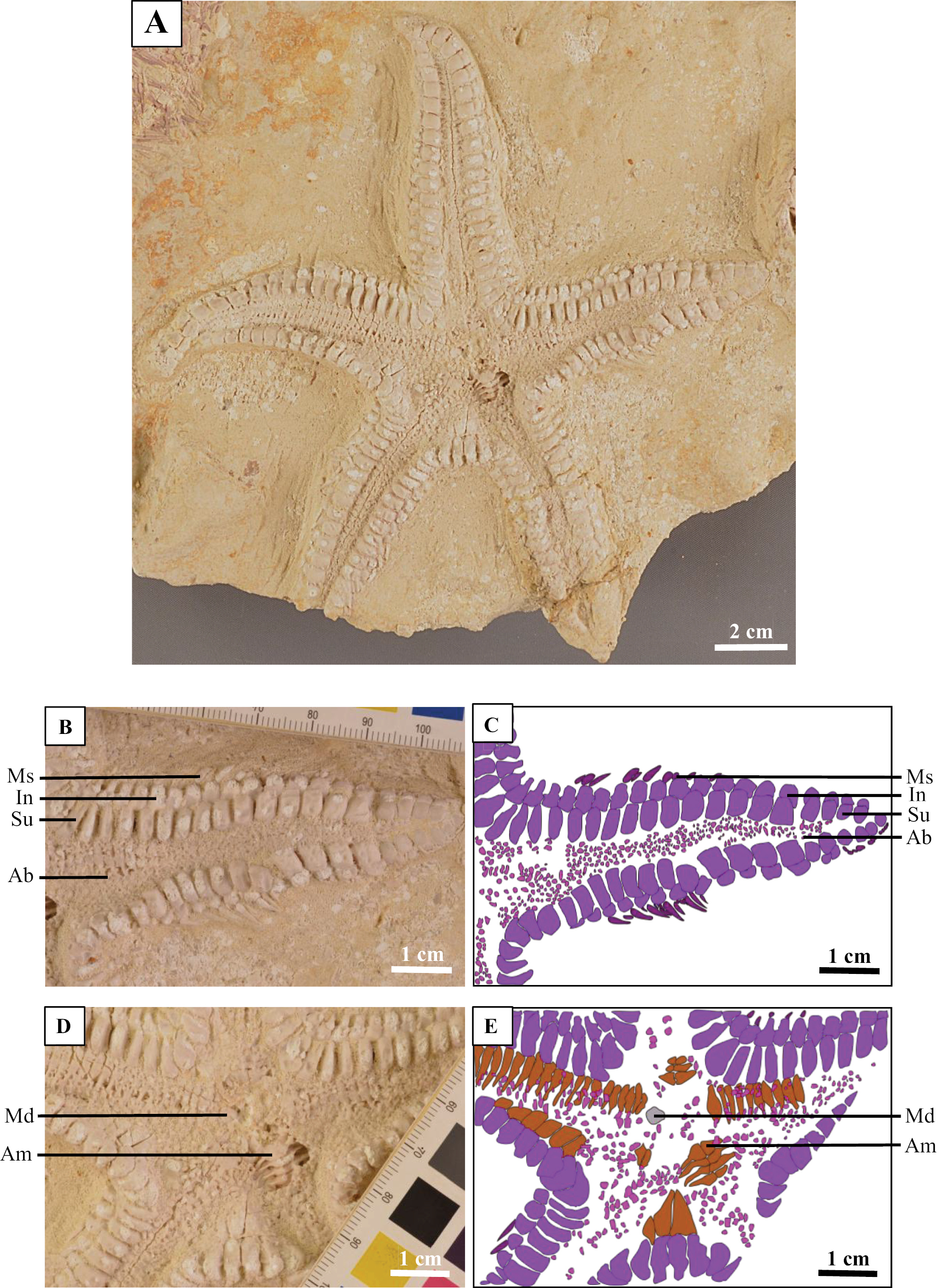
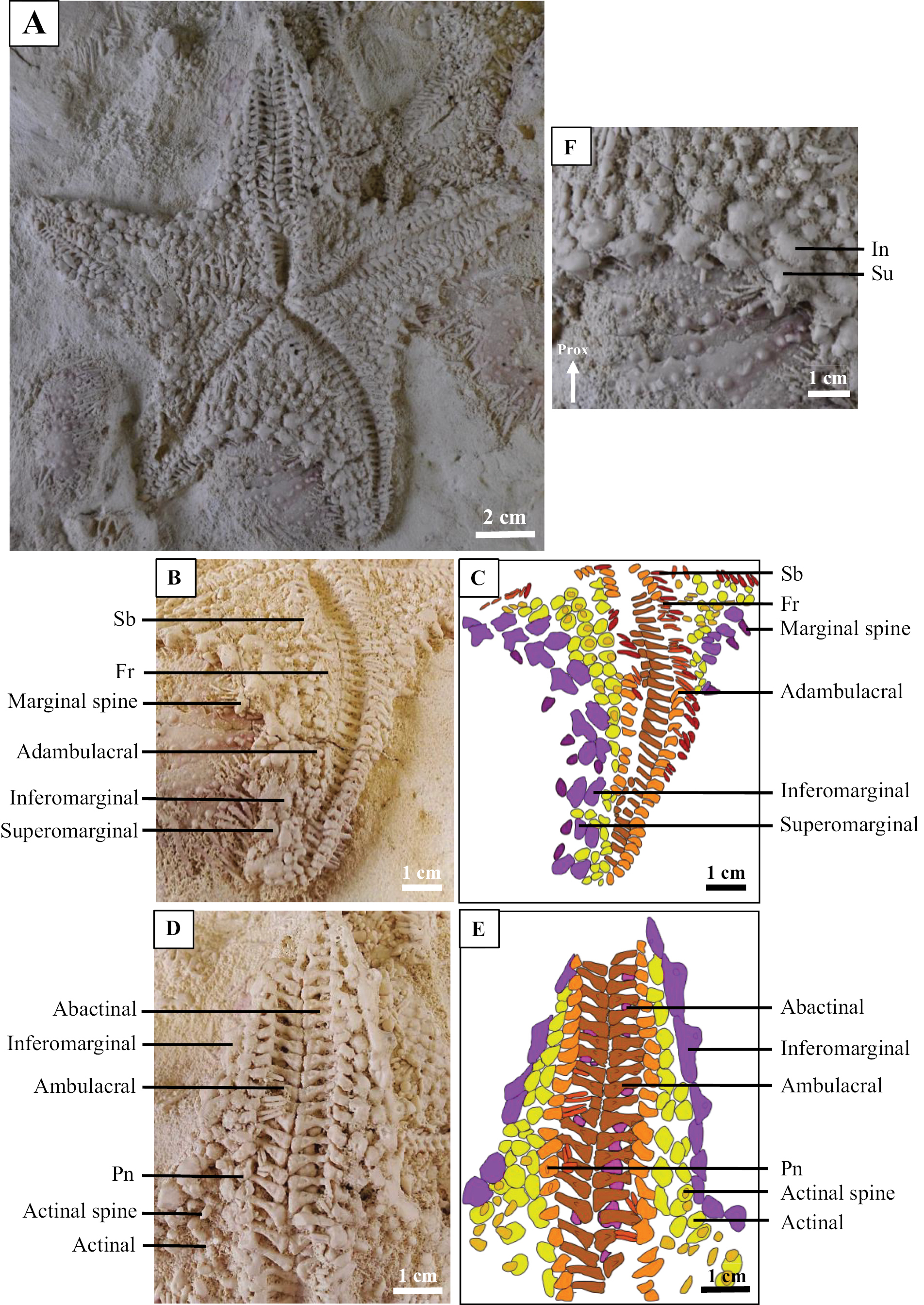
Select Calcaire de Ménerbes sea star specimens:
Lacosteaster, Astropecten, and Cruciformaster

The ossicles of the preserved echinoderms are almost always in anatomical position, which is very rare in the fossil record, further indicating exceptional preservation conditions. Known Calcaire de Ménerbes echinoderms comprise representatives of sea urchins (class Echinoidea), feather stars (Crinoidea), brittle stars (Ophiuroidea), and sea stars (Asteroidea). In addition to Menerbesaster, three other sea stars have been described from this locality. All four taxa belong to different families, highlighting the diversity of sea stars preserved and representing the first described example of a diverse assemblage of Miocene fossil sea stars in Western Europe. The first to be named was Lacosteaster lauerorum (Solasteridae), described in 2024 based on a single specimen. Twelve additional specimens were described in 2026 as part of a larger description of the locality's sea star fauna. Next, a single specimen has been identified as an unnamed species of the extant genus Astropecten (Astropectinidae). Cruciformaster pedicellarius (Oreasteridae) is the third taxon, known from two individuals preserved on one slab. It was described in the same 2026 publication as Menerbesaster.

Extant members of the starfish clades represented in the Calcaire de Ménerbes Formation are known to inhabit different environments from each other; most extant oreasterids inhabit warm and very shallow (0–100 metres (0–328 ft) deep) environments, solasterids mostly inhabit shallow (0–200 m (0–656 ft)) to upper bathyal (up to 1,000 metres (3,300 ft)) environments depending on the region (boreal or tropical), astropectinids mostly inhabit cold waters but can be found through temperate and tropical regions, and echinasterids inhabit many habitats in cold, temperate, and tropical environments. Extant oreasterids, solasterids, and echinasterids are epibenthic (lifestyle above sediment), while astropectinids are endobenthic (lifestyle burrowed in sediment). As such, members of these families do not generally overlap in modern habitats. The co-occurrence of these four sea star families with presumably very distinct ecologies based on modern analogs suggests they were transported through some natural event, which concentrated them together before their rapid burial.

Modern oreasterids and echinasterids are usually detrivores and predators of small prey. Applying this to the Calcaire de Ménerbes fauna, it is possible that Cruciformaster (an oreasterid) preyed on Tripneustes planus, a species of sea urchin known from the deposits, similar to the modern oreasterid Oreaster reticulatus preying on Tripneustes ventricosus. Modern Astropecten spp. make bivalves one of their two main food sources, so the Astropecten species preserved in the Calcaire de Ménerbes may have fed on juveniles Gigantopecten restitutensis.
