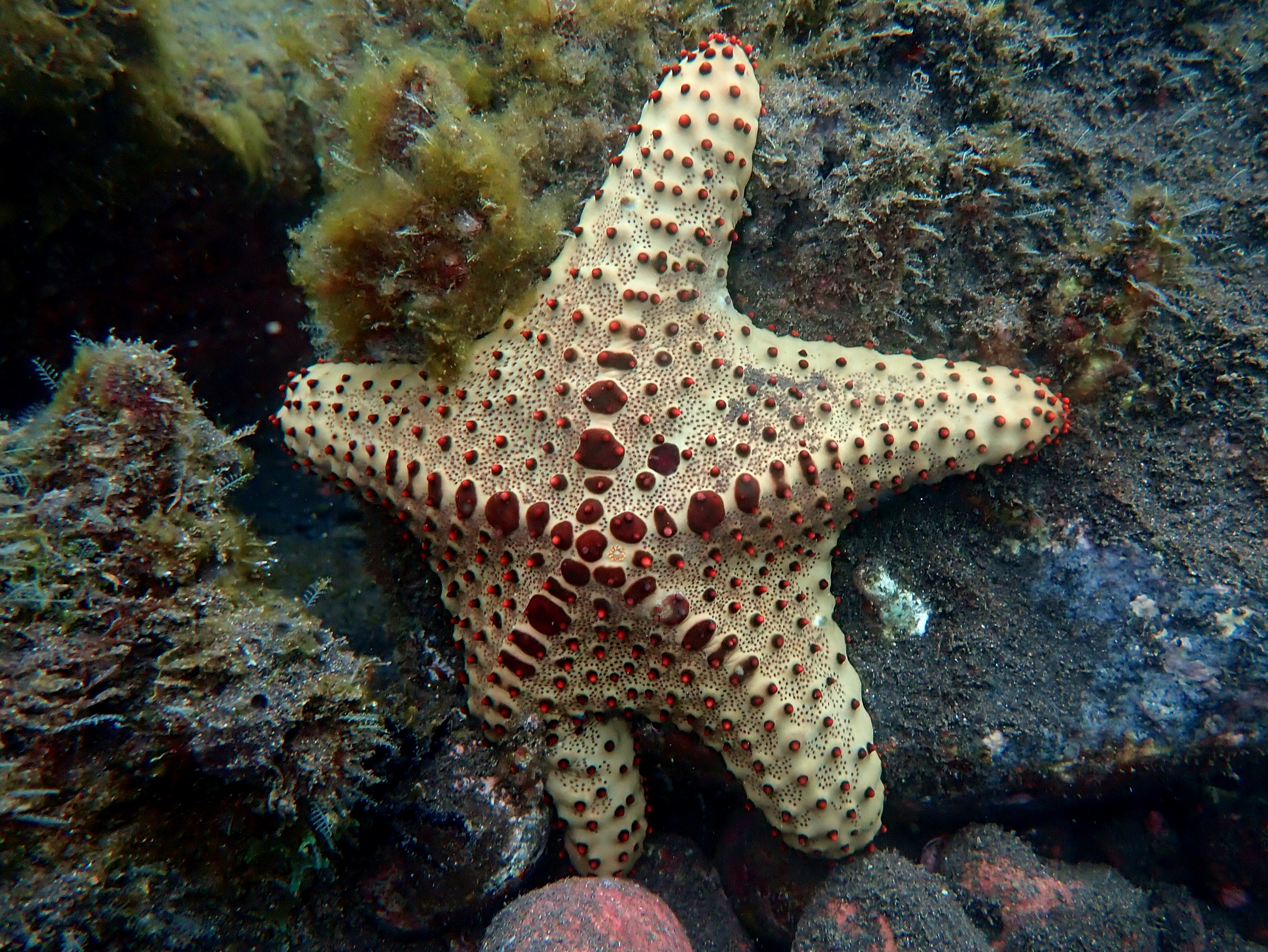

Scientific classification
- Kingdom: Animalia
- Phylum: Echinodermata
- Class: Asteroidea
- Order: Valvatida
- Family: Oreasteridae
- Genus: Oreaster
- Species: O. clavatus

Binomial name
- Oreaster clavatus Müller & Troschel, 1842

= Oreaster clavatus =

Species of starfish

Oreaster clavatus is a species of sea star that is found in the waters of the Atlantic Ocean, reportedly found from the coast of Angola to the coast of Cape Verde.

== Description ==
Oreastar clavatus is tan with dark brown specks and has 5 arms with dark brown knobs running from the center of the star to the tip of each arm, with small orange dots on each knob.

== History ==
Oreaster clavatus was described by Franz Hermann Troschel and Johannes Peter Müller in 1842. The oldest known preserved specimen of O. clavatus was collected near Nigeria in 1841 and is in the Natural History Museum in London.
