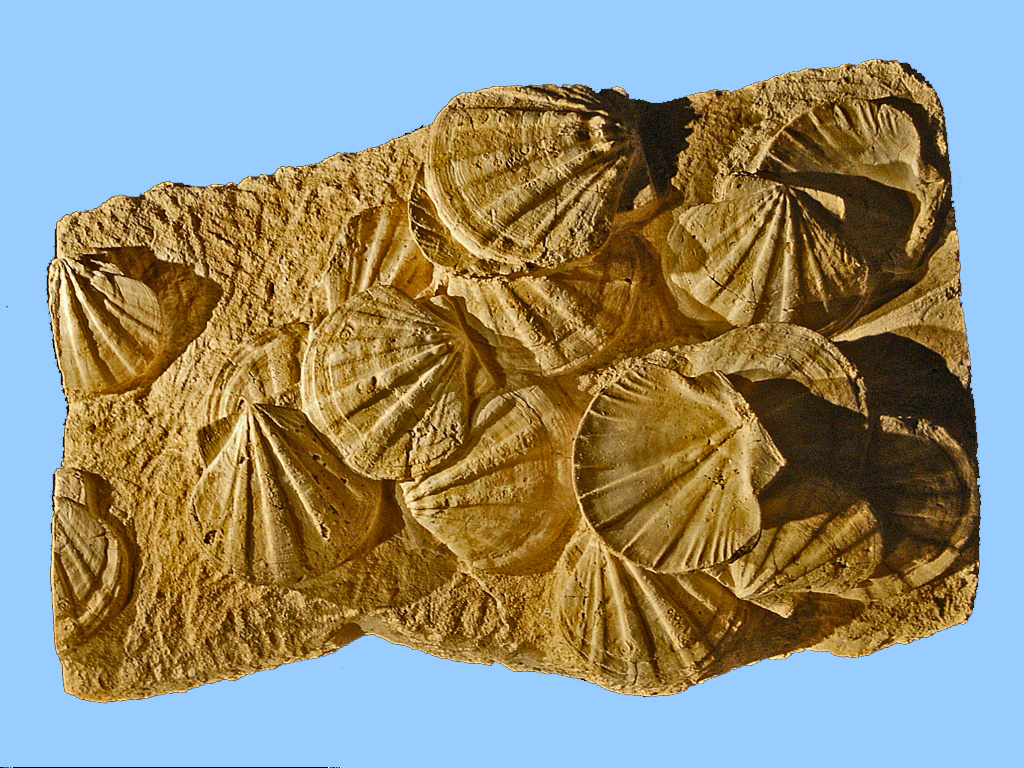
- Gigantopecten latissimus from France. Miocene (abt. 20 Ma)

Scientific classification
- Kingdom: Animalia
- Phylum: Mollusca
- Class: Bivalvia
- Order: Pectinida
- Family: Pectinidae
- Genus: †Gigantopecten
- Species: †G. latissimus

Binomial name
- †Gigantopecten latissimus (Brocchi,1814)

= Gigantopecten latissimus =

Gigantopecten latissimus Temporal range: Miocene to Pliocene

Extinct species of bivalve

Gigantopecten latissimus is a species of fossil scallop, a marine bivalve mollusk in the family Pectinidae, the scallops. This species lived during the Miocene and the Pliocene. Fossils have been found in the sediments of France and Spain.

== Description ==
Gigantopecten latissimus has a shell reaching a height of about 134 millimetres (5.3 in) and a length of about 167 millimetres (6.6 in). This shell is thick and biconvex. The left valve is slightly more convex than the right one. The outer surface of the right valve has six shallow radial ribs that are rectangular in cross-section, while the left valve shows five radial ribs on the external surface. Both valves have distinct concentric growth striae.
