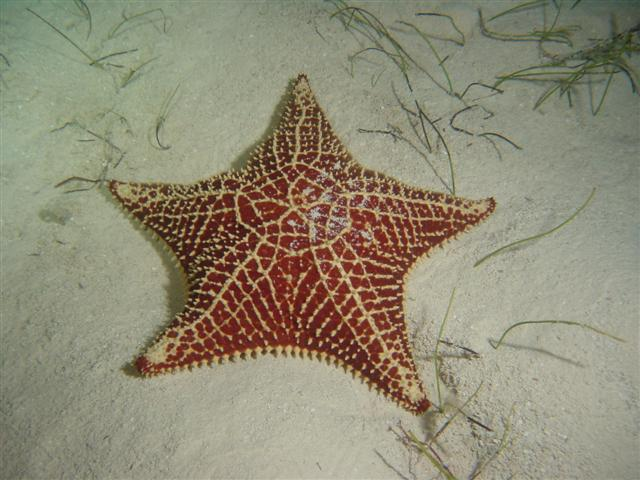
- O. reticulatus

Scientific classification
- Kingdom: Animalia
- Phylum: Echinodermata
- Class: Asteroidea
- Order: Valvatida
- Family: Oreasteridae
- Genus: Oreaster; Müller & Troschel, 1842

Species
- See text

Synonyms
- Pentaceros J.E.Gray, 1840

= Oreaster =

Genus of starfishes

Oreaster is a genus of sea stars in the family Oreasteridae.

== Selected species ==
Species include:

- Oreaster clavatus Müller & Troschel, 1842
- Oreaster reticulatus (Linnaeus, 1758)
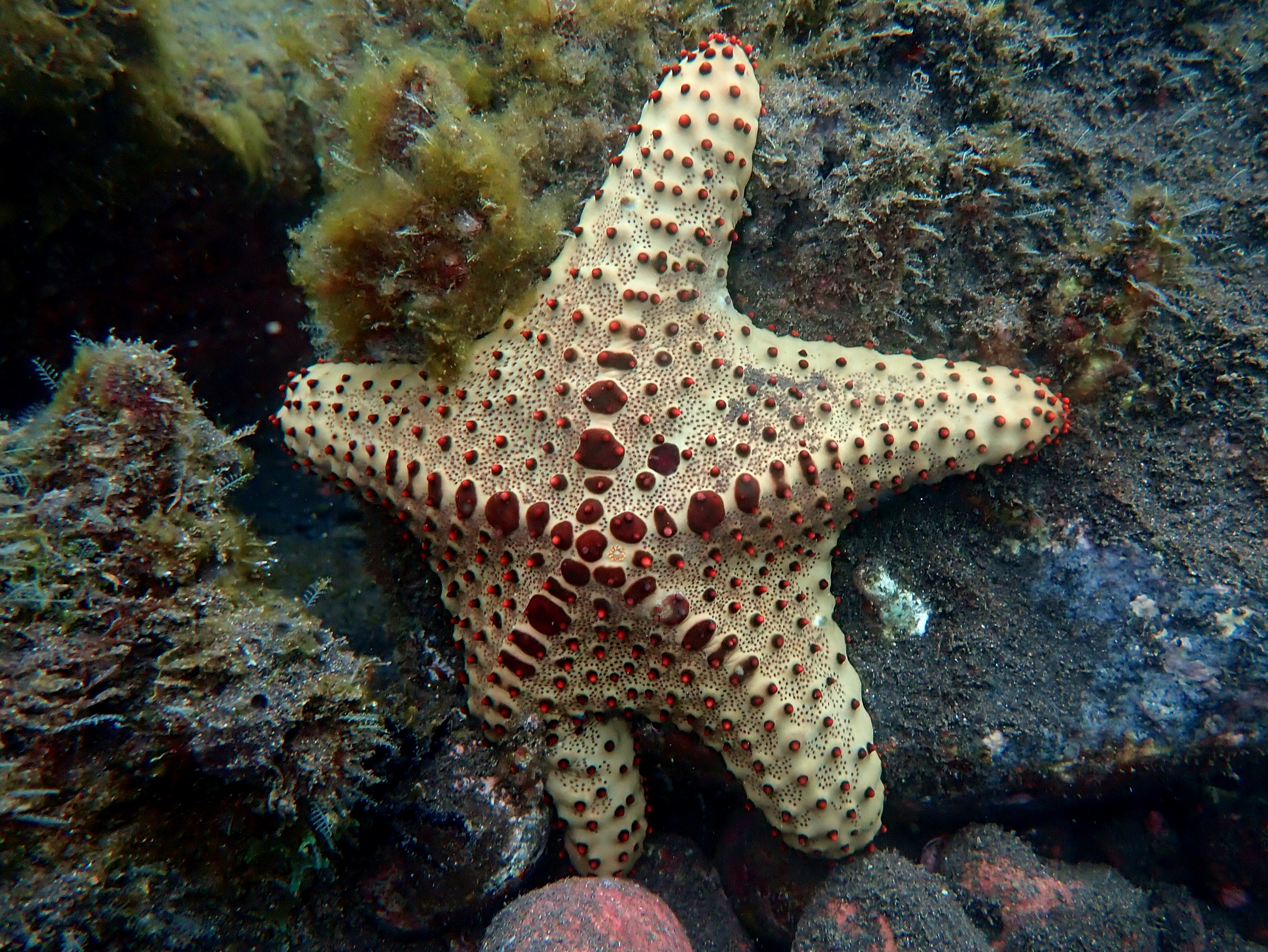
Oreaster clavatus

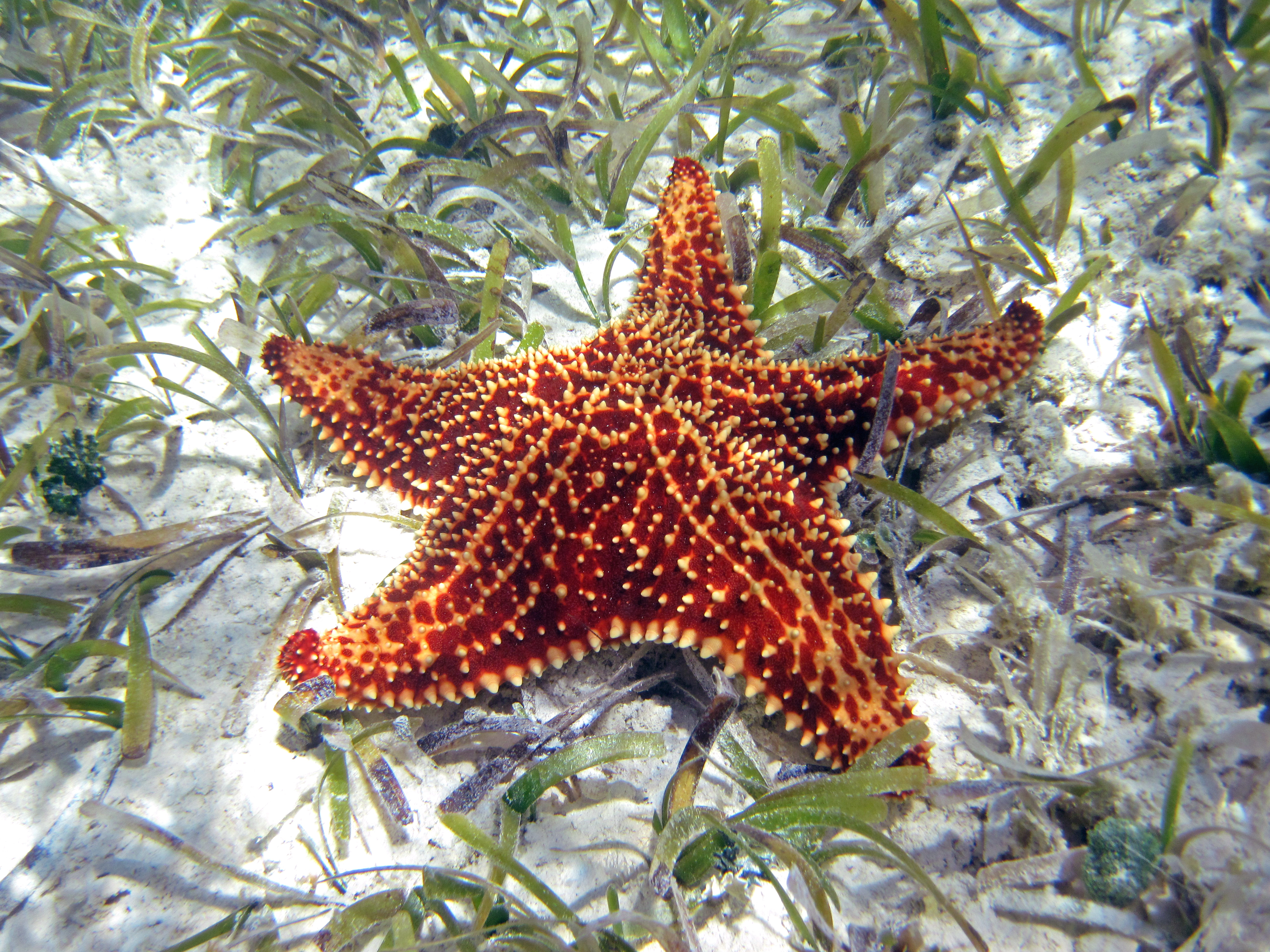
Oreaster reticulatus
