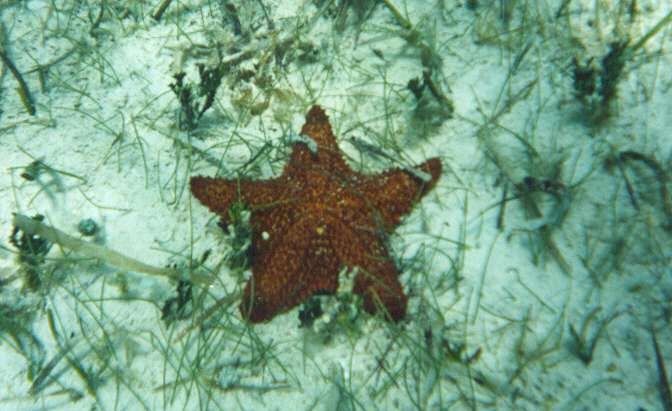
- The red cushion sea star, Oreaster reticulatus, at San Salvador Island, Bahamas

Conservation status
- Apparently Secure (NatureServe)

Scientific classification
- Kingdom: Animalia
- Phylum: Echinodermata
- Class: Asteroidea
- Order: Valvatida
- Family: Oreasteridae
- Genus: Oreaster
- Species: O. reticulatus

Binomial name
- Oreaster reticulatus (Linnaeus, 1758)

Synonyms
- Asterias gigas Linnaeus, 1753; Asterias pentacyphus Retzius, 1805; Asterias reticulata Linnaeus, 1758; Asterias sebae de Blainville, 1830; Oreaster aculeatus (Gray, 1840); Oreaster bermudensis H.L. Clark, 1942; Oreaster gigas Lutken, 1859; Oreaster lapidarius Grube, 1857; Oreaster tuberosus Behn in Mobius, 1859; Pentaceros aculeatus Gray, 1840; Pentaceros gibbus Gray, 1840; Pentaceros grandis Gray, 1840; Pentaceros reticulatus Gray, 1840

= Oreaster reticulatus =

Species of starfish

Oreaster reticulatus, commonly known as the red cushion sea star or the West Indian sea star, is a species of marine invertebrate, a starfish in the family Oreasteridae. It is found in shallow water in the western Atlantic Ocean and the Caribbean Sea.

== Description ==
The red cushion star is the largest sea star found within its range, sometimes growing to about 50 centimetres (20 in) in diameter. It usually has five thick, broad arms projecting from a broad cushioned disc but some specimens have four, six or seven. The upper surface is hard and is covered with blunt spines. The color of adults is some shade of red, orange, yellow or brown. The juveniles are greenish-brown with mottled markings.

== Distribution and habitat ==
The red cushion star occurs in many regions of the Western Central Atlantic, including the Bahamas, Cape Frio, Cape Hatteras, the Caribbean Sea, Florida, the Gulf of Mexico, Guyanas and Yucatán. Adults are usually found on sandy bottoms and coral rubble at depths of up to 37 metres (121 ft) while juveniles inhabit seagrass meadows where their colouring helps provide camouflage. In the winter, the red cushion star migrates to offshore locations with little water movement in order to avoid turbulence.

== Biology ==
The red cushion star is an omnivore and feeds on the seabed sediment and the epiphytic algae, sponges and small invertebrates it finds there. It rakes together heaps of sediment and then turns its cardiac stomach inside out and engulfs the mass. Edible sponge species are chosen in preference to other prey and tend to be eliminated from areas where the starfish abound.

The sexes are separate in the red cushion star. In subtropical areas it breeds in the summer, but in more tropical locations it breeds all year. Large numbers of individuals may collect together in one location at breeding time with densities sometimes reaching fourteen per square metre (yard). This concentration of individuals enhances the chance of fertilization when the gametes are liberated into the sea. The larvae form part of the zooplankton and drift with the currents. After passing through several developmental stages they settle on the seabed, usually among seagrass, and undergo metamorphosis into juvenile starfish.

== Harvesting ==
Harvesting Oreaster reticulatus is illegal in some places including Florida waters.

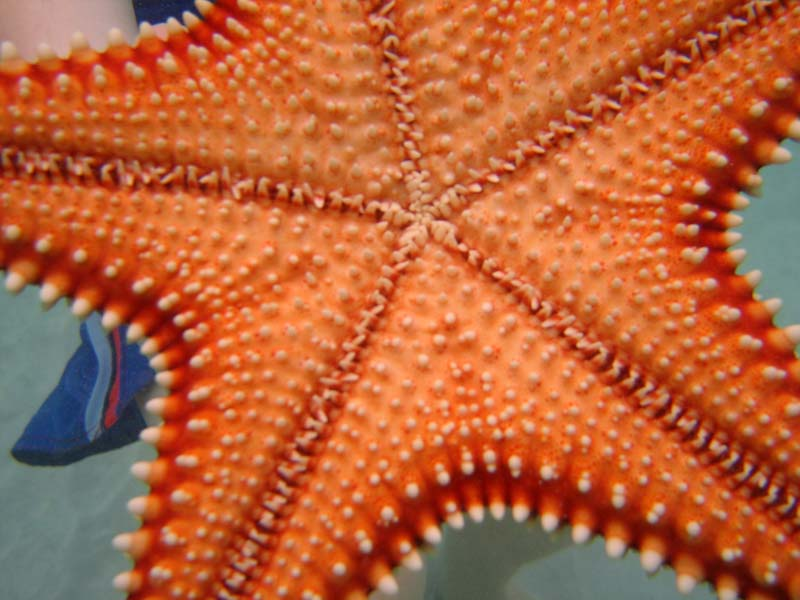
The oral surface of Oreaster reticulatus

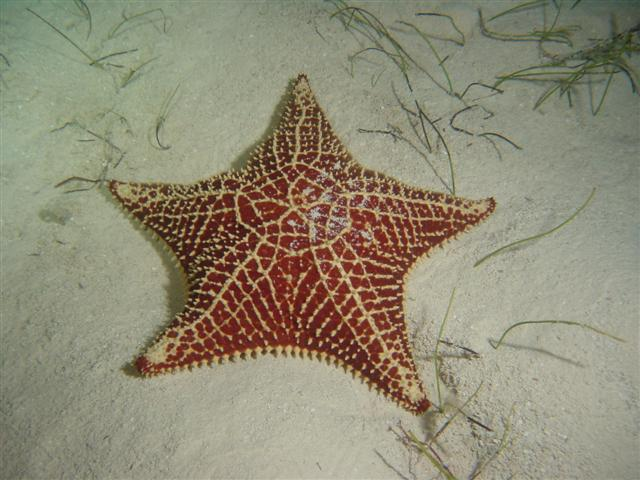
Regular Oreaster reticulatus, symmetrical five-pointed star

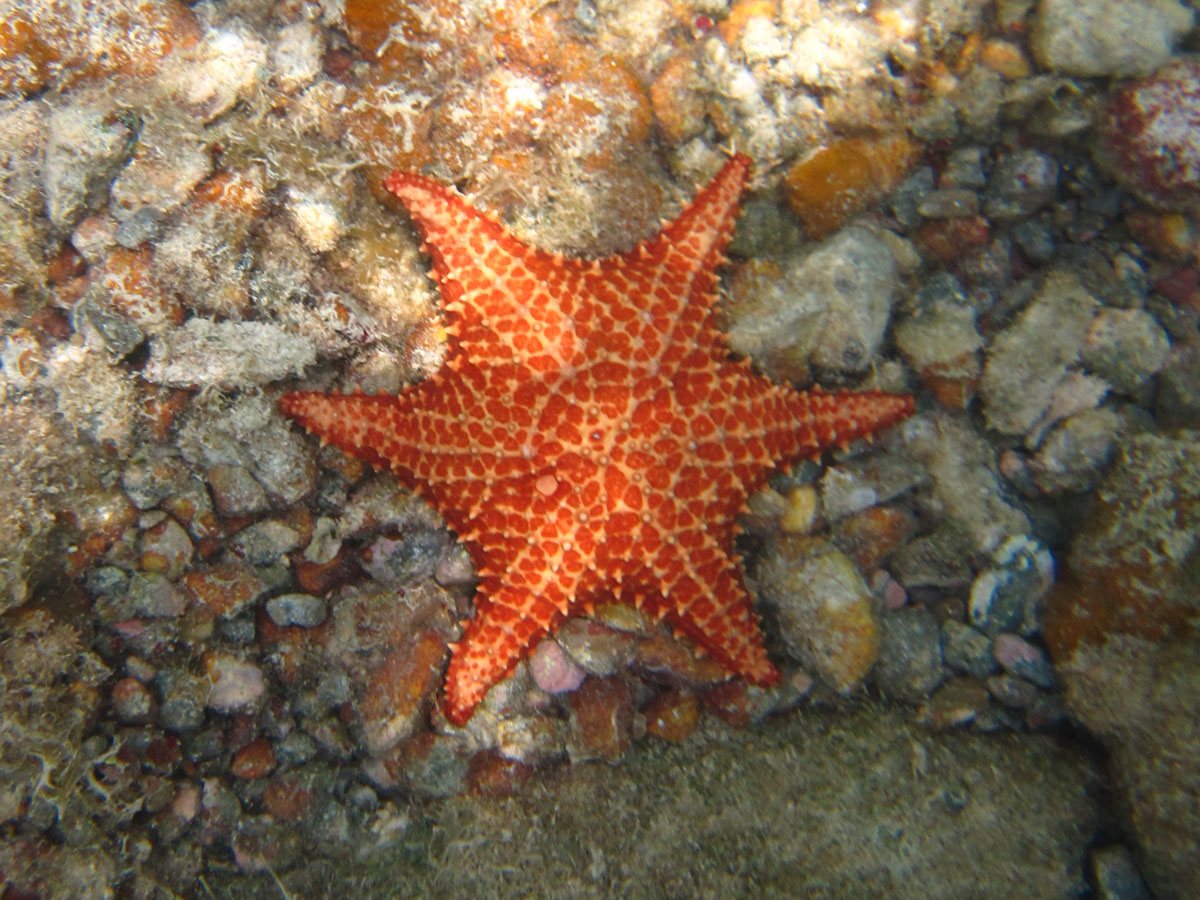
Unusual six armed specimen, Mosquito Pier, Vieques, Puerto Rico

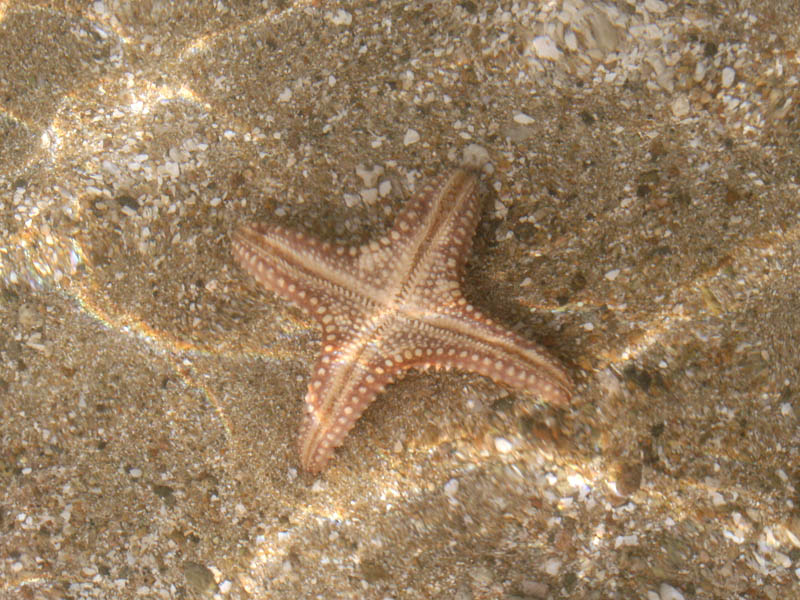
Four armed specimen

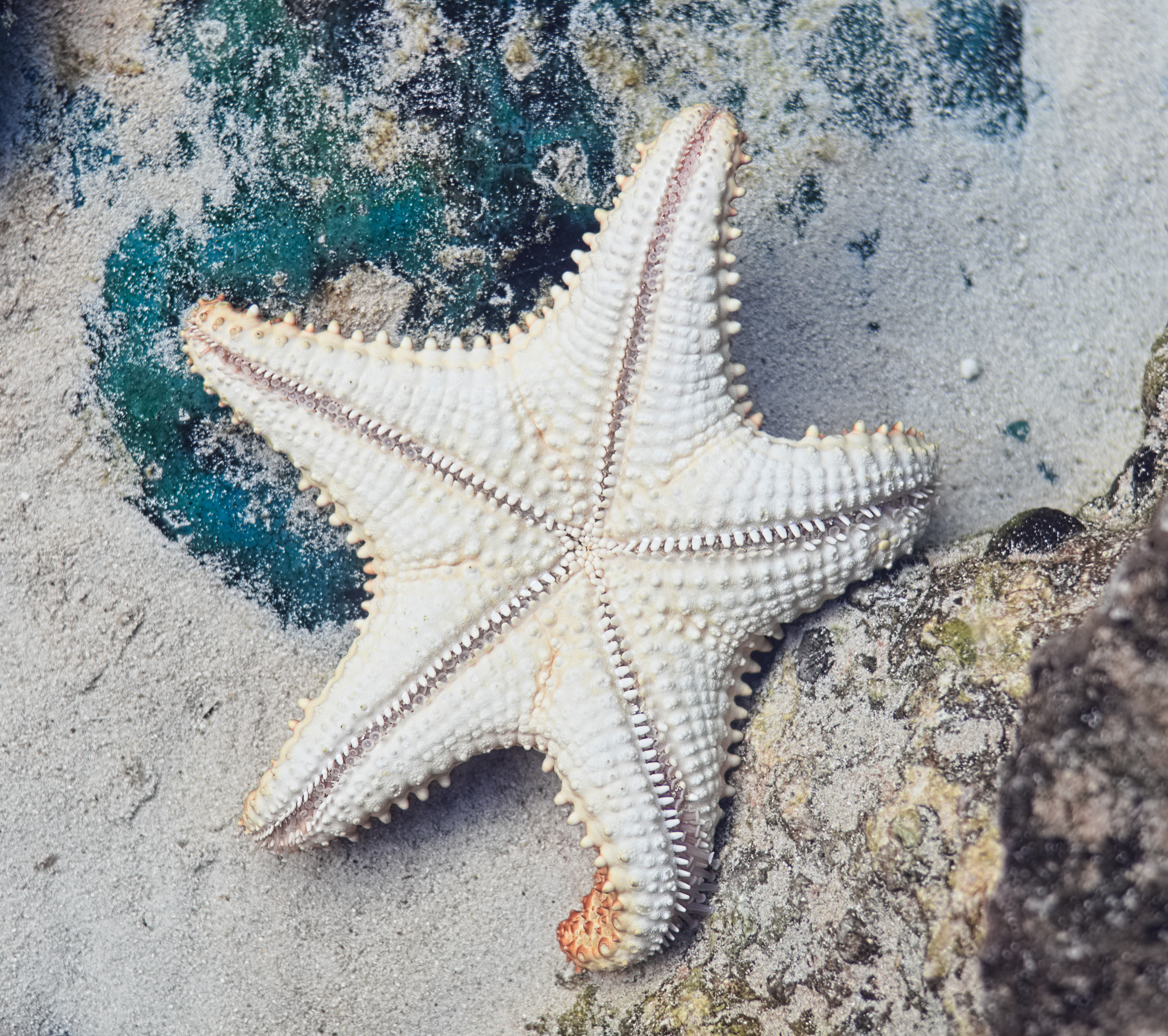

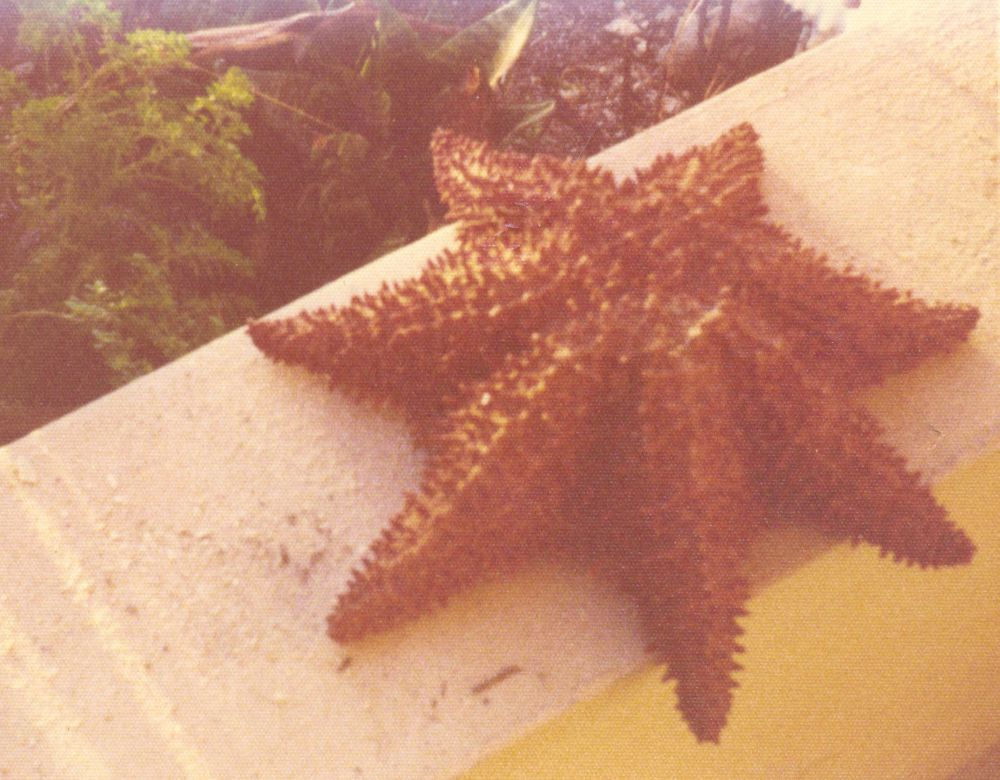
Unusual seven arm specimen of Oreaster reticulatus, Rendezvous Bay, Anguilla, 1973
