= Ménerbes =

Ménerbes Menèrba (Occitan)
- Commune
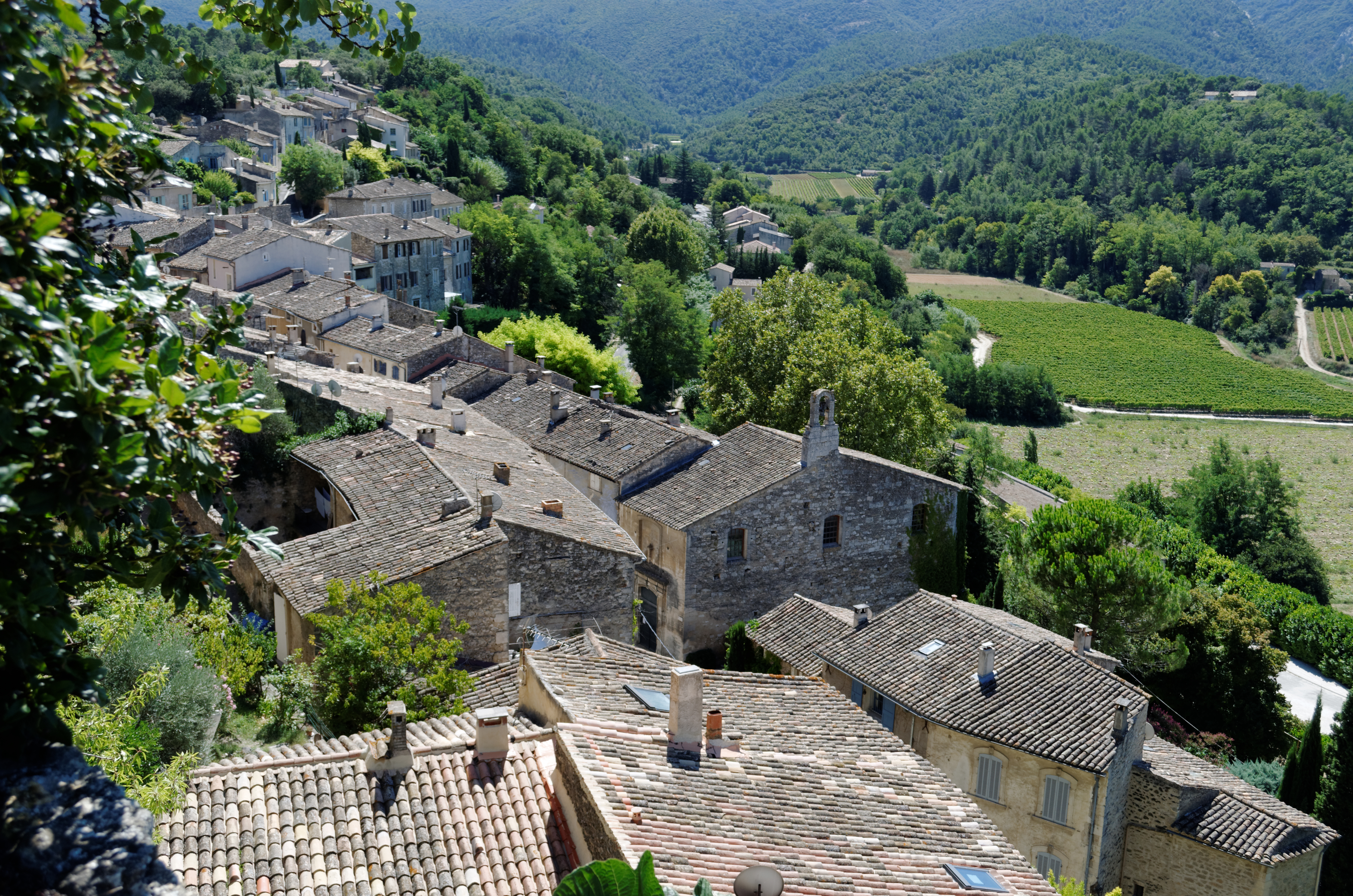
- A view of Ménerbes

- Coat of arms
- Location of Ménerbes
- Location within France Location within Provence-Alpes-Côte d'Azur
- Coordinates: 43°50′00″N 5°12′26″E
- Country: France
- Region: Provence-Alpes-Côte d'Azur
- Department: Vaucluse
- Arrondissement: Apt
- Canton: Apt

Government
  - Mayor (2020–2026): Christian Ruffinato
- Area^{1}: 30.27 km^{2} (11.69 sq mi)
- Elevation: 244 m (801 ft)
- Highest elevation: 693 m (2,274 ft)
- Lowest elevation: 112 m (367 ft)
- Population (2023): 962
  - Density: 31.8/km^{2} (82.3/sq mi)
- Time zone: UTC+01:00 (CET)
  - Summer (DST): UTC+02:00 (CEST)
- INSEE/Postal code: 84073 /84560
- ^{1} French Land Register data, which excludes lakes, ponds, glaciers > 1 km^{2} (0.386 sq mi or 247 acres) and river estuaries.

Ménerbes (French pronunciation: [menɛʁb]; Occitan: Menèrba) is a commune in the Vaucluse department in the Provence-Alpes-Côte d'Azur region of Southeastern France. The walled village on a hilltop in the Luberon mountains, foothills of the French Alps, constitutes the main settlement in the commune. As of 2023, the population of the commune was 962. It is a member of Les Plus Beaux Villages de France (The Most Beautiful Villages of France) Association.

== History ==
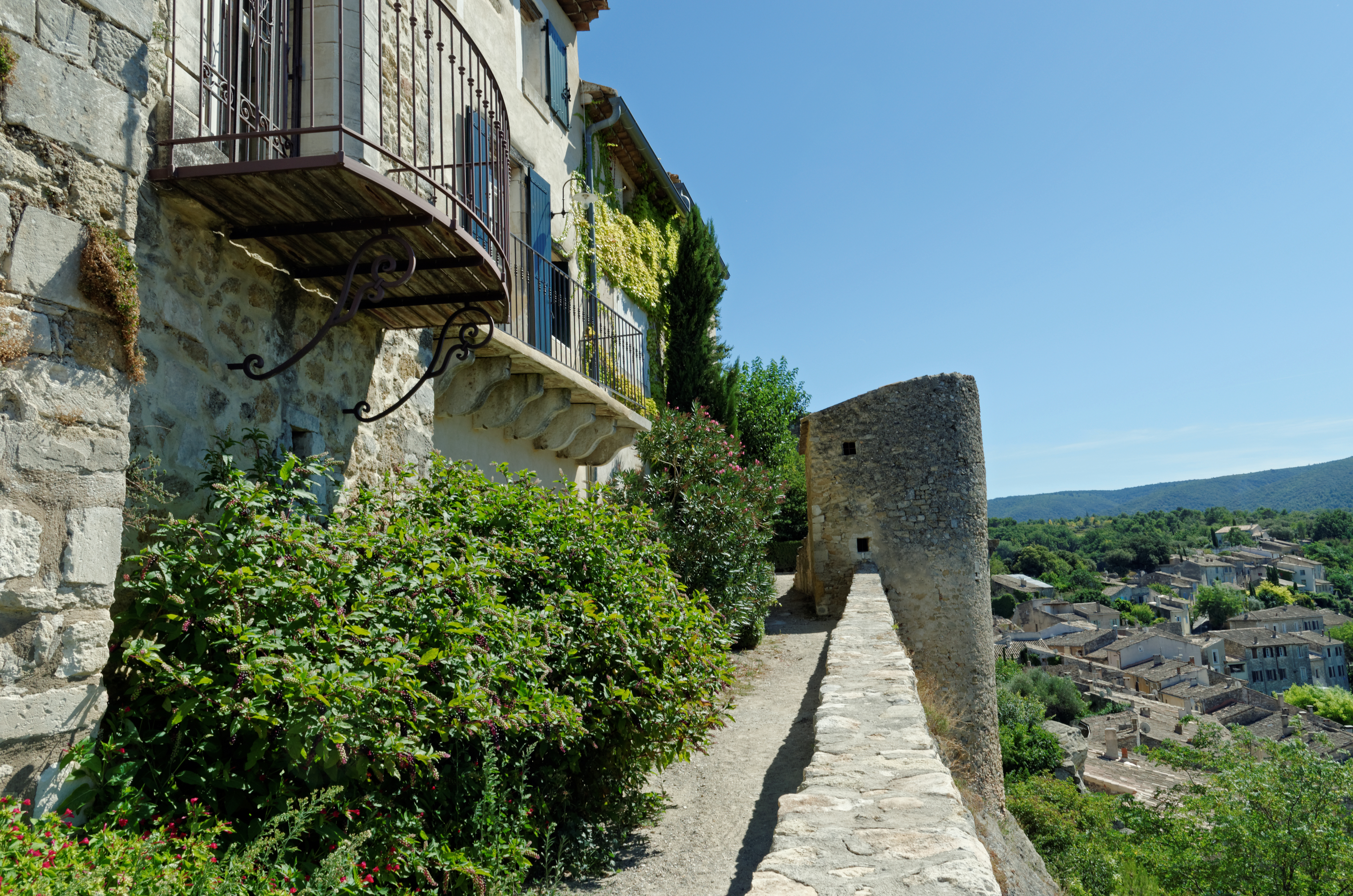
Citadel

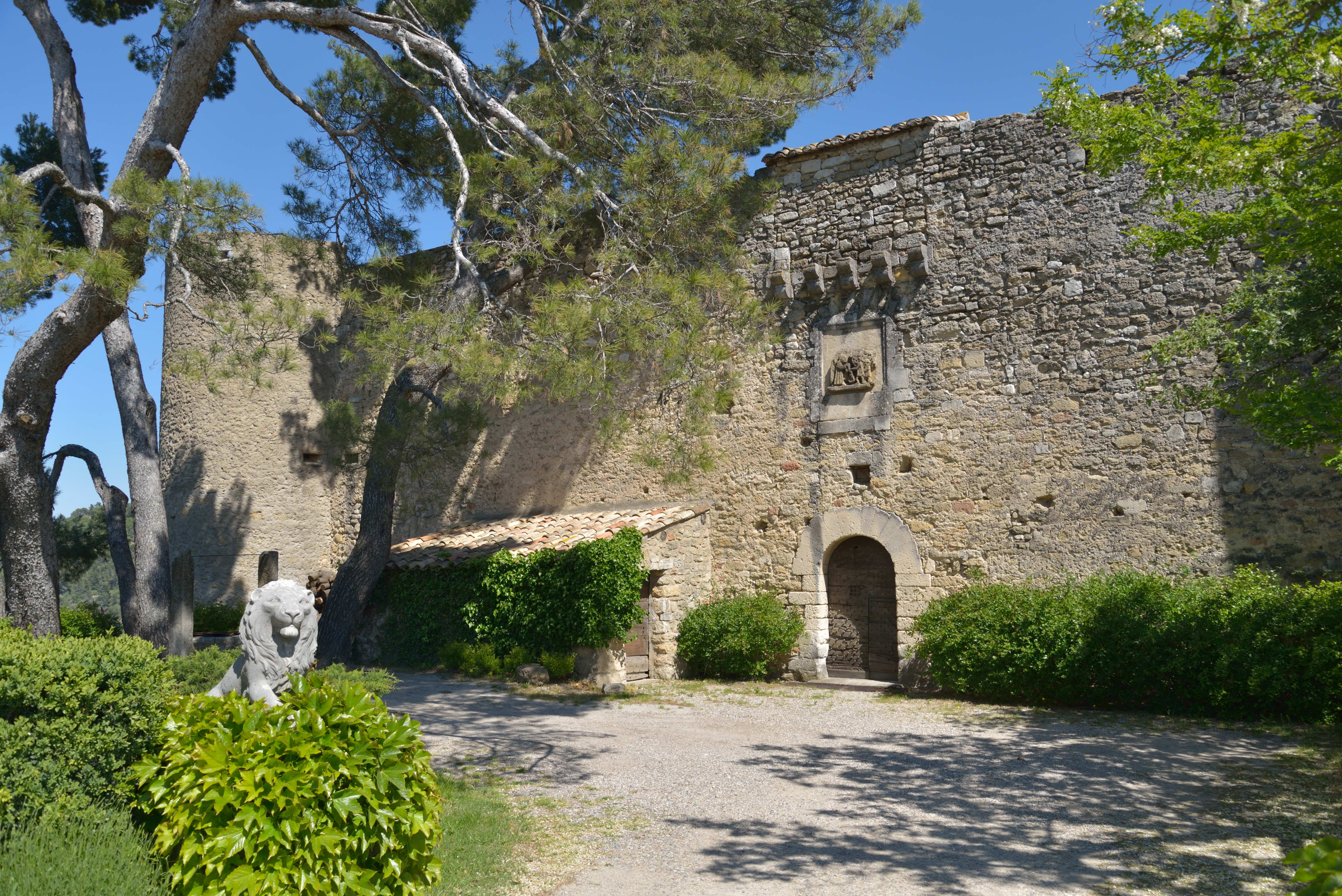
Château de Ménerbes

The village of Ménerbes and its citadel were the site of a major battle between Huguenots and Catholics, called the siege de Ménerbes, which lasted from 1573 to 1578 during the French Wars of Religion. Following early battles across France, Protestants decided to intentionally antagonize Pope Pius V by establishing a stronghold in Ménerbes, initially with 150 soldiers and followers led by Scipione de Valvoire, Gaspard Pape de Saint-Auban, and a baron from Germany. General mobilization on both sides followed, with Catholic forces led by Henri d'Angoulême for the Pope.

Despite the balance of power being strongly in favor of the Catholics, the fighting dragged on, increasing in force as time passed. Surrounded by trenches with opposing soldiers, the citadel suffered more than 900 blows by cannonballs, assaults by 14 tons of lead bullets, and barrages by incendiary weapons leading to destruction of its towers.

The Protestants finally agreed to negotiations, surrendering on 9 December 1578 to a "glorious capitulation." The battle, which lasted five years, two months and eight days, had been costly, draining the coffers of the towns in the Comtat Venaissin and putting a heavy financial burden on papal accounts.

== Geography ==
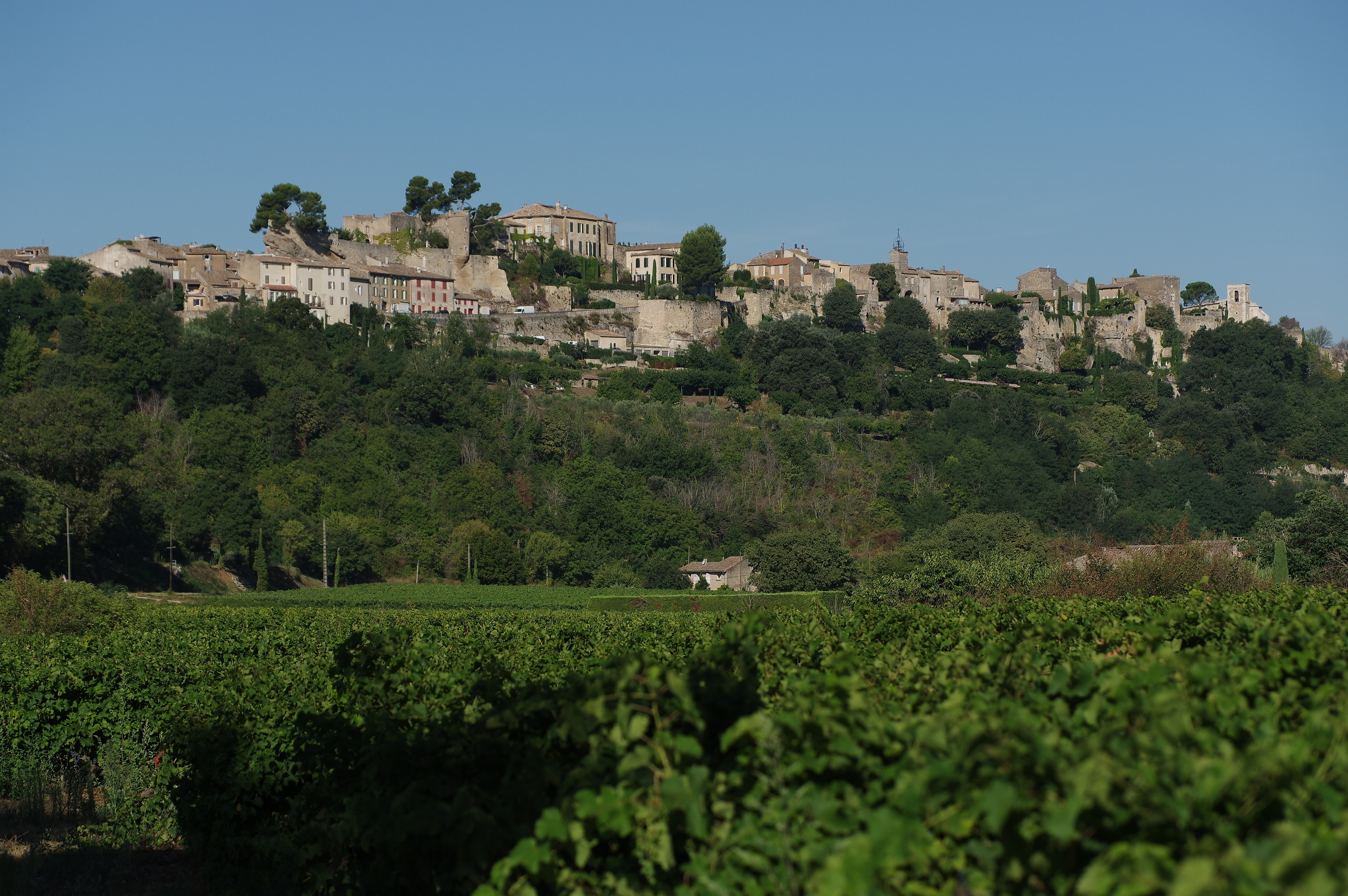
The village of Ménerbes seen from the east

The river Calavon forms part of the commune's northern border.

== Culture ==
Rural Vaucluse was described by author Marcel Pagnol in such novels as Manon des Sources, a hardscrabble peasant life in a declining economy. In the years after 1945 the region offered cheap holiday homes. By 1960 Ménerbes was half depopulated but was the residence of Dora Maar, an artist as well as a lover and muse of Picasso, and the widow of artist Nicolas de Staël, and holiday homes of a London art dealer and a French diplomat, whose visitors to Ménerbes thus included many artistic notables. The artist Joe Downer moved to Ménerbes in the late 1960s and divided his time between the village and Paris.

Surrounding farms grow lavender, mushrooms, truffles and grapes used in the production of red wine. Within sight of Ménerbes are the ruins of the Chateau de Lacoste, country residence of the notorious Marquis de Sade.

Ménerbes became known in the English-speaking world since 1990 through the books of British author Peter Mayle, tales of a British expatriate who settled in the village of Ménerbes. One of his books was made into the film A Good Year (2006), directed by Ridley Scott and starring Russell Crowe, which was filmed nearby in the region, largely in the nearby town of Bonnieux. Mayle's best-known book was A Year in Provence, and this put the Luberon region onto the tourist map.

Currently, The Brown Foundation Fellows Program based at Dora Maar's former home in Menerbes provides residencies of one to three months for mid-career professionals in the arts and humanities to concentrate on their fields of expertise. Joe Downer, who died in 2007, is remembered by a memorial garden opposite the Maison Dora Maar.

== See also ==
- Côtes du Luberon AOC
- Communes of the Vaucluse department
- Luberon
- Clovis Hugues
