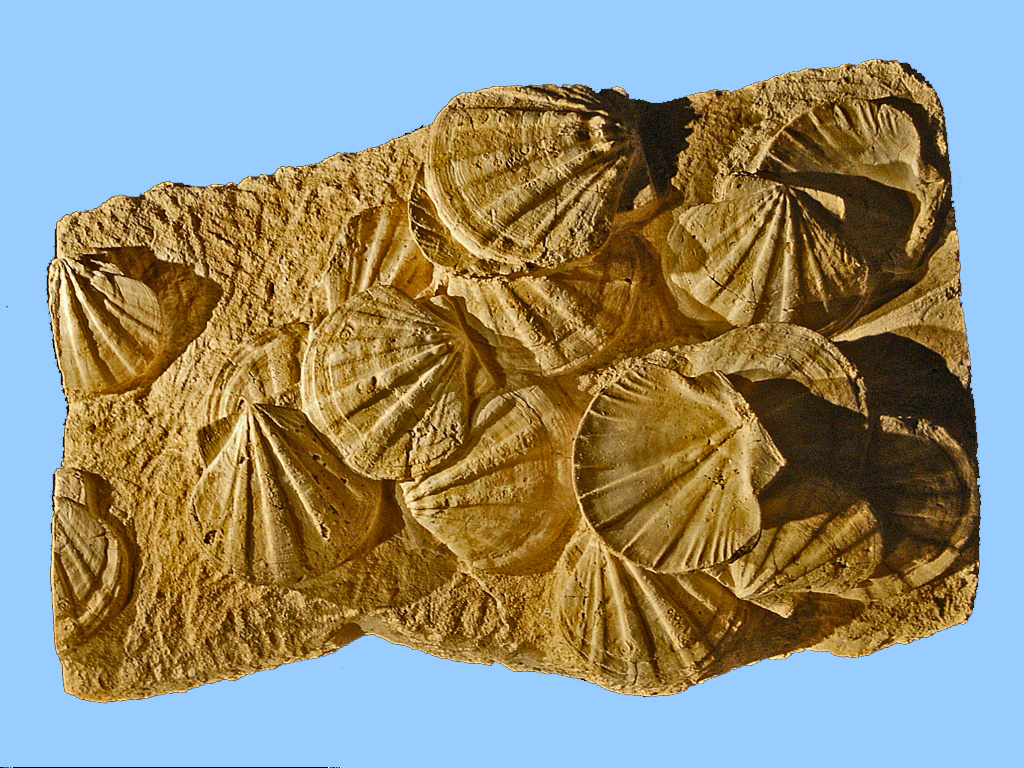
- Gigantopecten latissimus from France. Miocene (abt. 20 Ma)

Scientific classification
- Kingdom: Animalia
- Phylum: Mollusca
- Class: Bivalvia
- Order: Pectinida
- Family: Pectinidae
- Genus: †Gigantopecten; Rovereto, 1899

Synonyms
- Grandipecten Cossmann, 1914; Macrochlamys Sacco in Bellardi & Sacco, 1897

= Gigantopecten =

Gigantopecten Temporal range: Oligocene to Quaternary

Extinct genus of bivalves

Gigantopecten is a genus of fossil scallops, marine bivalve molluscs in the family Pectinidae, the scallops.

These facultatively mobile low-level epifaunal suspension feeders lived from the Oligocene to the Quaternary period (from 33.9 to 0.781 Ma).

== Species ==
Species within the genus Gigantopecten include:

- Gigantopecten latissimus (Brocchi, 1814)
- Gigantopecten nodosiformis (Pusch, 1837)
- Gigantopecten pittieri Dall 1912
- Gigantopecten gigas (Schlotheim, 1813)

== Description ==
Species within this genus have a very large shells, reaching a height of about 134 millimetres (5.3 in) and a length of about 167 millimetres (6.6 in). The shell is thick and biconvex. The left valve is slightly more convex than the right one. The radial ribs are wide, but very shallow. Both auricles are the same size and shape.

== Distribution ==
Fossils of species within this genus have been found in the sediments of the United States, Italy, Algeria, Austria, Cuba, France, Haiti, Hungary, Poland, Slovakia and Iran.
