= Salmacis (disambiguation) =

Salmacis or Salmakis (Ancient Greek: Σαλμακίς) was a naiad in Greek mythology.

Salmacis or Salmakis may also refer to:

- Salmacis (Caria), a town now in Turkey
- Salmacis (fountain), in Greek mythology
- Salmacis (echinoderm), a genus of sea urchins
