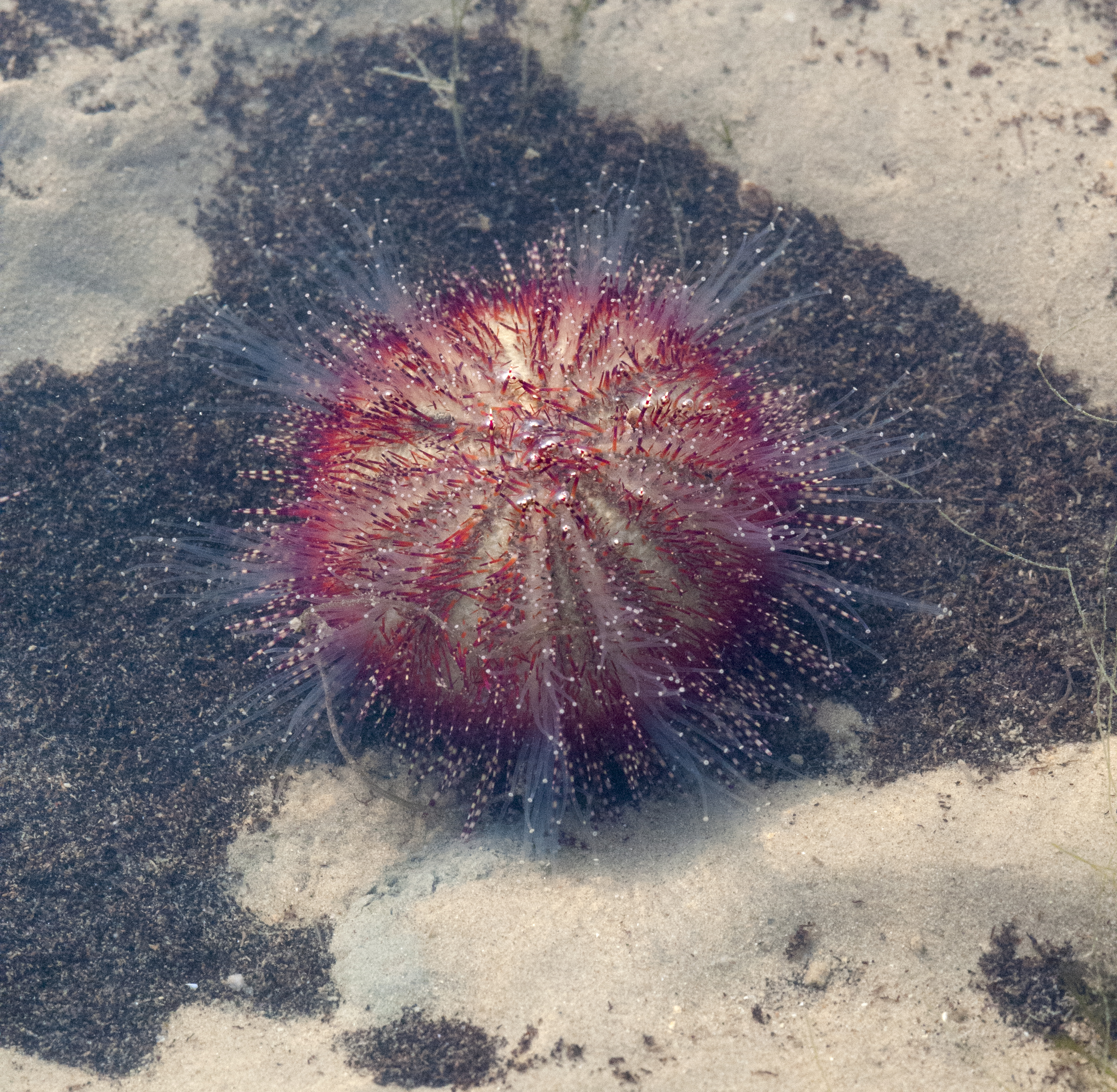

Scientific classification
- Kingdom: Animalia
- Phylum: Echinodermata
- Class: Echinoidea
- Order: Camarodonta
- Family: Temnopleuridae
- Genus: Salmacis
- Species: S. bicolor

Binomial name
- Salmacis bicolor L. Agassiz in L. Agassiz & Desor, 1846

= Salmacis bicolor =

Species of sea urchin

Salmacis bicolor is a species of sea urchin in the Temnopleuroida family Temnopleuridae found in the western Indian Ocean and the Red Sea. the name derives from Salmacis (Ancient Greek: 'Σαλμακίς'), a nymph of Greek mythology, and latin 'bicolor' (two-coloured).
