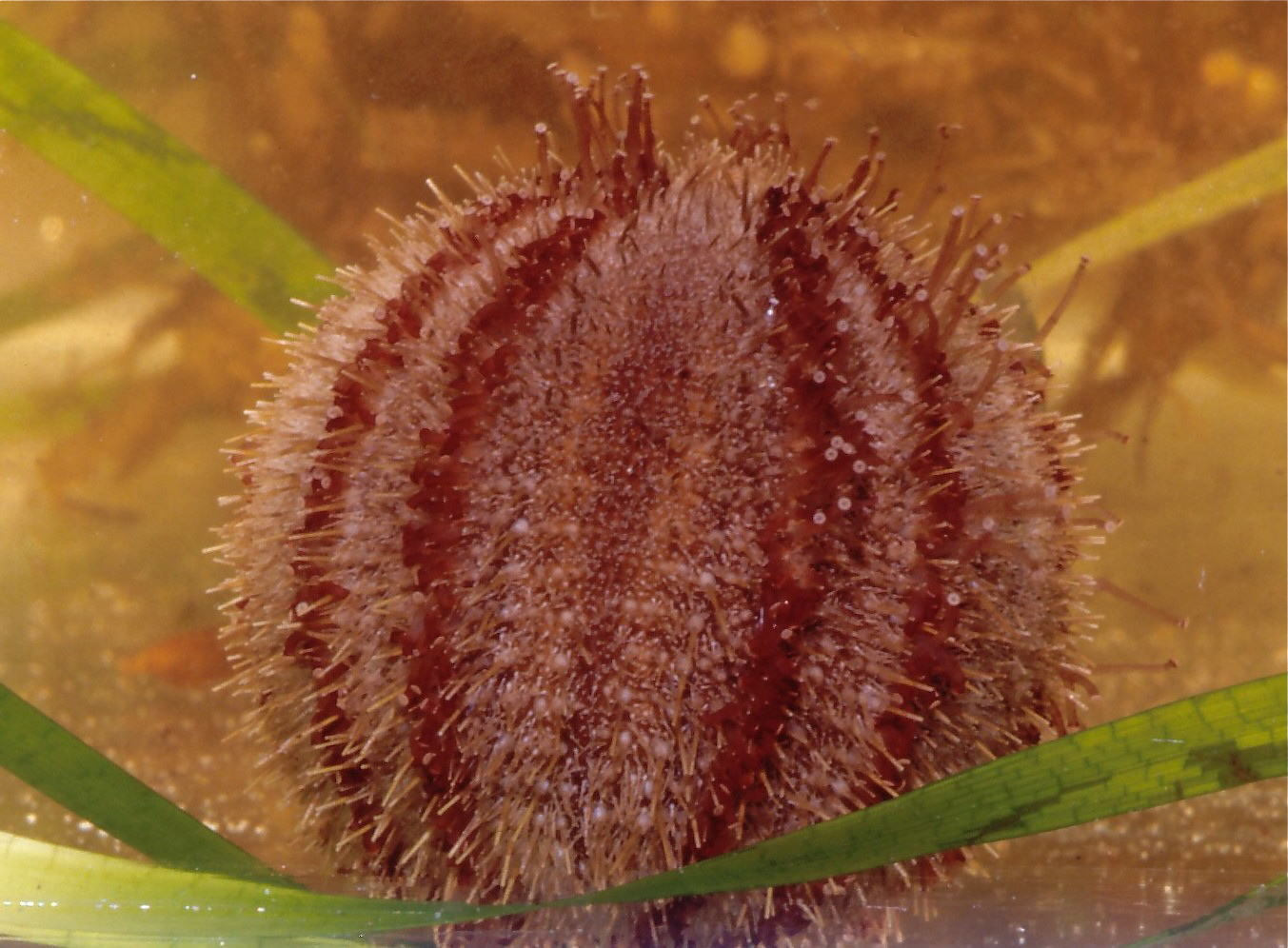

Scientific classification
- Domain: Eukaryota
- Kingdom: Animalia
- Phylum: Echinodermata
- Class: Echinoidea
- Order: Camarodonta
- Family: Temnopleuridae
- Genus: Amblypneustes
- Species: A. ovum

Binomial name
- Amblypneustes ovum (Lamarck, 1811)

Synonyms
- Amblypneustes griseus (Blainville, 1825); Amblypneustes serialis L. Agassiz in L. Agassiz & Desor, 1846; Amblypneustes textilis L. Agassiz in L. Agassiz & Desor, 1846; Echinus griseus Blainville, 1825; Echinus ovum Lamarck, 1816

= Amblypneustes ovum =

Species of sea urchin

Amblypneustes ovum is a species of sea urchin of the family Temnopleuridae. Their armour is covered with spines. It is in the genus Amblypneustes and lives in the sea. Amblypneustes ovum was first scientifically described in 1816 by Jean-Baptiste de Lamarck.
