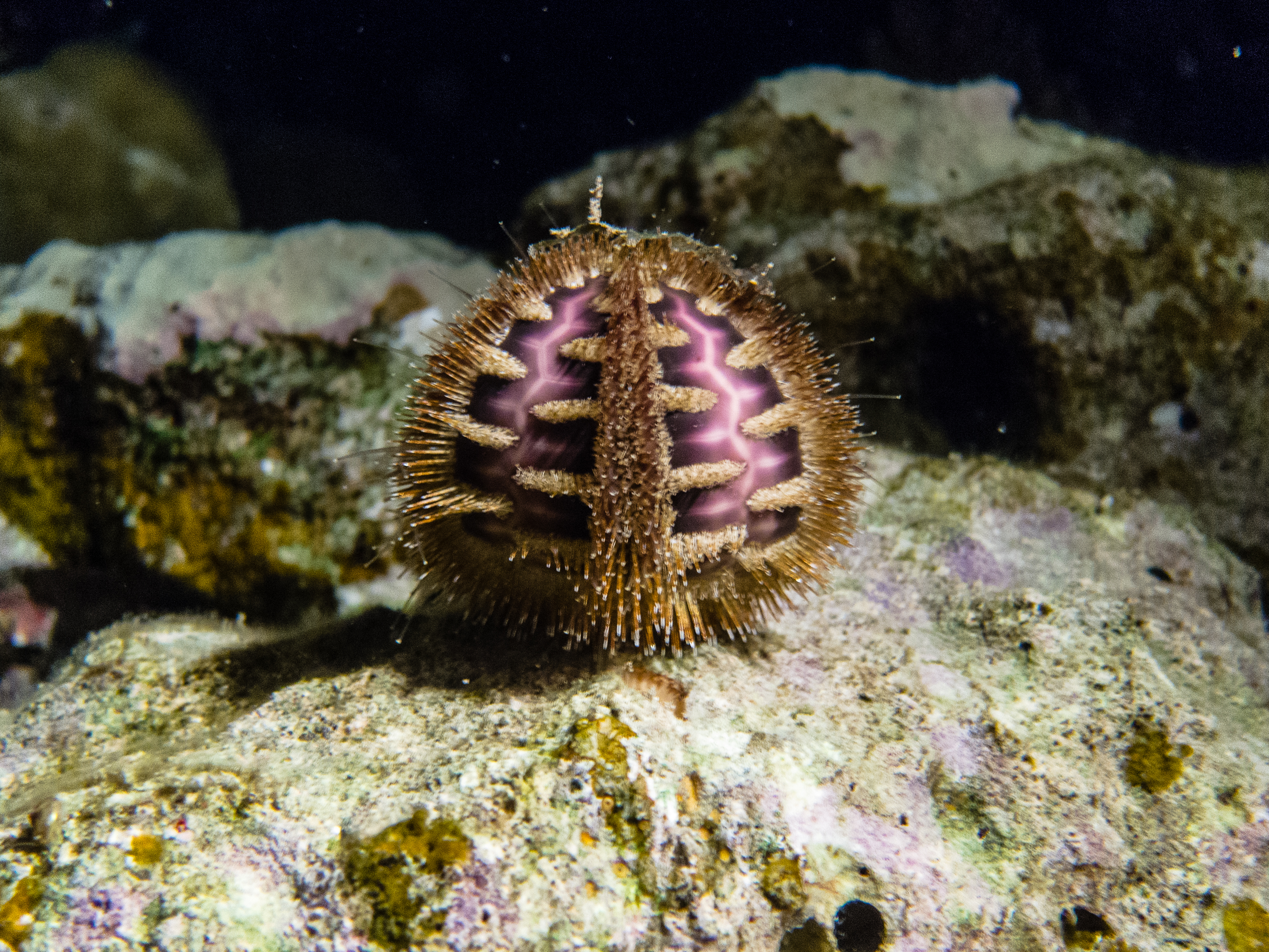
- Microcyphus rousseaui

Scientific classification
- Kingdom: Animalia
- Phylum: Echinodermata
- Class: Echinoidea
- Order: Camarodonta
- Family: Temnopleuridae
- Genus: Microcyphus; L. Agassiz & Desor, 1846

= Microcyphus =

Genus of sea urchins

Microcyphus is a genera of echinoderms belonging to the order Temnopleuridae.

== Species ==
Image	Scientific name	Distribution
	Microcyphus annulatus Mortensen, 1904	Australia
	Microcyphus ceylanicus Mortensen, 1942	Western Pacific: South China Sea.
	Microcyphus compsus H.L. Clark, 1912	Australia
	Microcyphus excentricus Mortensen, 1940	North Pacific Ocean, Philippines, Sulu
	Microcyphus keiensis Mortensen, 1942	Australia
	Microcyphus maculatus L. Agassiz in L. Agassiz & Desor, 1846	Australia
	Microcyphus olivaceus (Döderlein, 1885)	Western Pacific: Japan, Taiwan
	Microcyphus rousseaui L. Agassiz in L. Agassiz & Desor, 1846	East Africa, Egypt, Kenya, Madagascar, Red Sea, Somalia, South-Africa, Tansania, Western Indian Ocean
	Microcyphus zigzag L. Agassiz in L. Agassiz & Desor, 1846	Australia

=== Fossils ===
- †Microcyphus iglahensis Elattaar, 2001a
- †Microcyphus javanus Jeannet in Lambert & Jeannet, 1935
- †Microcyphus melo Jeannet in Lambert & Jeannet, 1935
