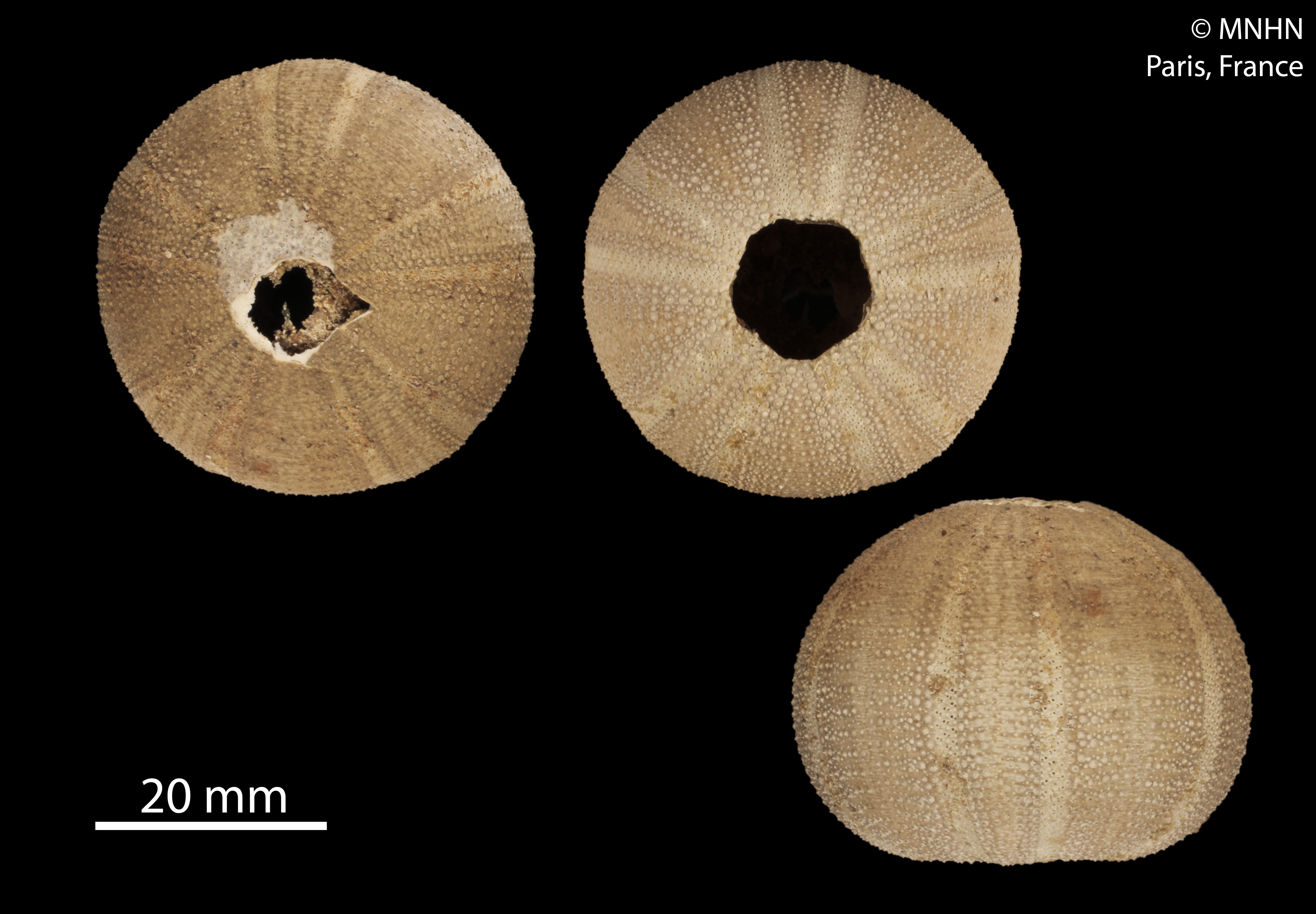

Scientific classification
- Domain: Eukaryota
- Kingdom: Animalia
- Phylum: Echinodermata
- Class: Echinoidea
- Order: Camarodonta
- Family: Temnopleuridae
- Genus: Amblypneustes
- Species: A. pallidus

Binomial name
- Amblypneustes pallidus (Lamarck, 1816)

= Amblypneustes pallidus =

Species of sea urchin

Amblypneustes pallidus is a species of sea urchin of the family Temnopleuridae. Their armour is covered with spines. It is in the genus Amblypneustes and lives in the sea. Amblypneustes pallidus was first scientifically described in 1816 by Jean-Baptiste de Lamarck.
