= Amblypneustes leucoglobus =

Scientific classification
- Kingdom: Animalia
- Phylum: Echinodermata
- Class: Echinoidea
- Order: Camarodonta
- Family: Temnopleuridae
- Genus: Amblypneustes
- Species: A. leucoglobus

Binomial name
- Amblypneustes leucoglobus Döderlein, 1914

Species of sea urchin

Amblypneustes leucoglobus is a species of sea urchin of the family Temnopleuridae. Their armour is covered with spines. It is in the genus Amblypneustes and lives in the sea. Amblypneustes leucoglobus was first scientifically described in 1914 by Ludwig Döderlein.
