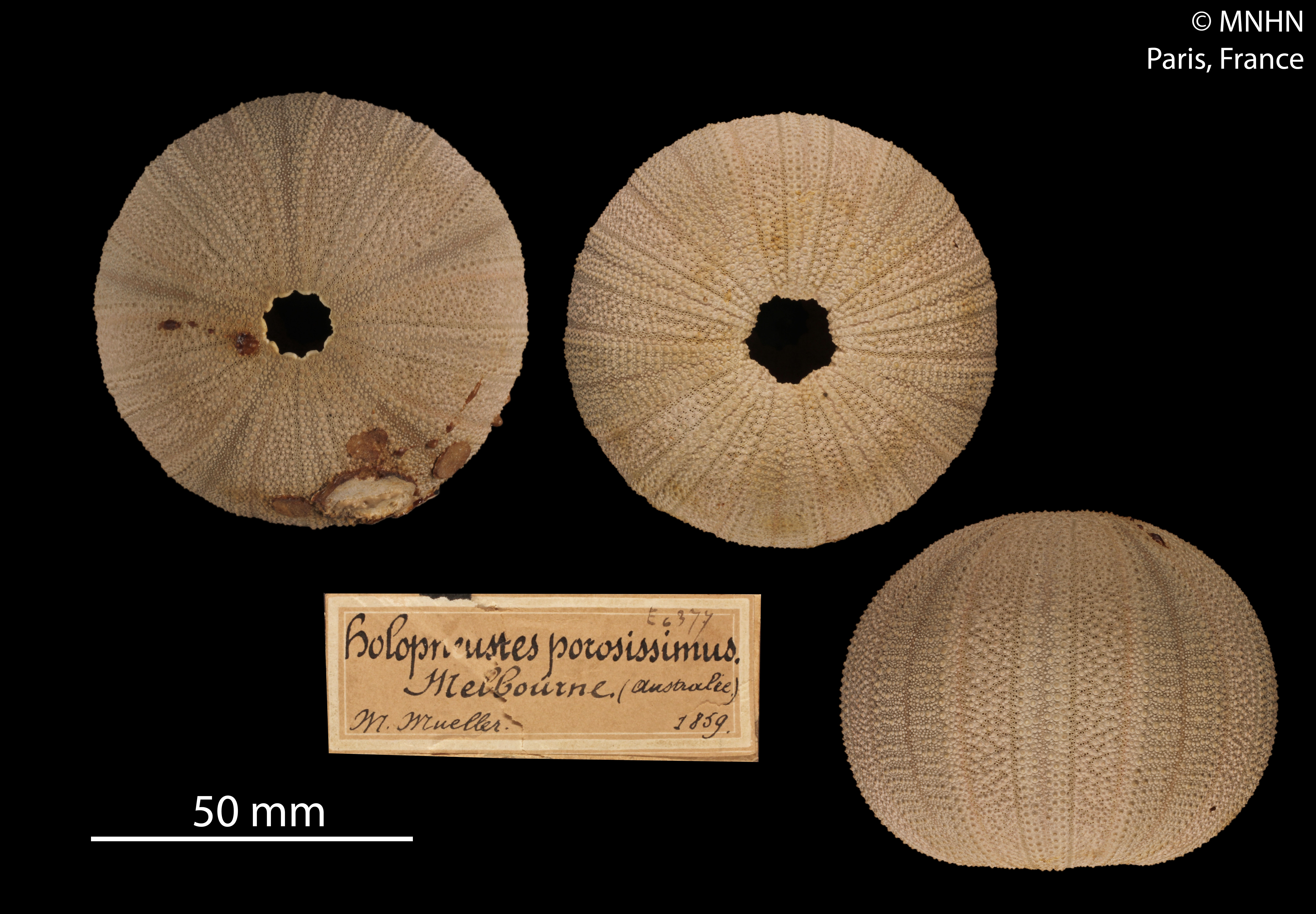
- Holopneustes porosissimus

Scientific classification
- Kingdom: Animalia
- Phylum: Echinodermata
- Class: Echinoidea
- Order: Camarodonta
- Family: Temnopleuridae
- Genus: Holopneustes; L. Agassiz, 1841

Type species
- Holopneustes porosissimus L. Agassiz in L. Agassiz & Desor, 1846

= Holopneustes =

Genus of sea urchins

Holopneustes is a genus of sea urchins, belonging to the family Temnopleuridae.

== Species ==
Image	Scientific name	Distribution
	Holopneustes inflatus (A. Agassiz, 1872)	southern Australia, in New South Wales, Victoria, South Australia, Western Australia and Tasmania.
	Holopneustes porosissimus L. Agassiz in L. Agassiz & Desor, 1846	Australia
	Holopneustes purpurascens (A. Agassiz, 1872)	Australia, in New South Wales

== See also ==
- Amblypneustes – a closely related genus
