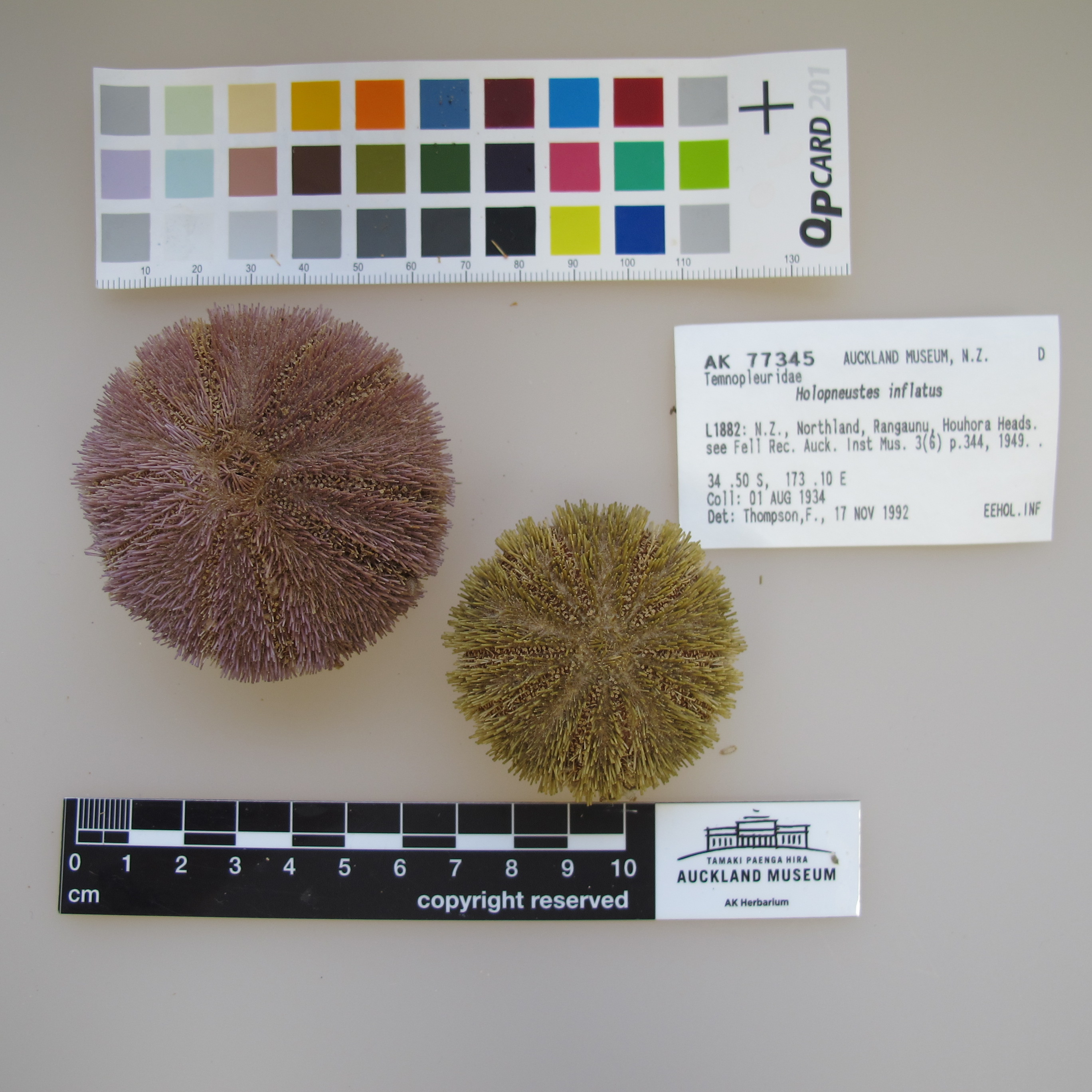

Scientific classification
- Kingdom: Animalia
- Phylum: Echinodermata
- Class: Echinoidea
- Order: Camarodonta
- Family: Temnopleuridae
- Genus: Amblypneustes
- Species: A. elevatus

Binomial name
- Amblypneustes elevatus (Hutton, 1872)

Synonyms
- Amblypneustes ovum pachista H. L. Clark, 1912; Amblypneustes ovum pachistus H. L. Clark, 1938; Amblypneustes pachistus H. L. Clark, 1912; Amblypneustes triseriatus H. L. Clark, 1912; Echinus elevatus Hutton, 1872; Holopneustes inflatus Mortensen, 1921 (preoccupied: Lutken, 1872)

= Amblypneustes elevatus =

Species of sea urchin

Amblypneustes elevatus is a species of sea urchin of the family Temnopleuridae. Their armour is covered with spines. It is in the genus Amblypneustes and lives in the sea.
