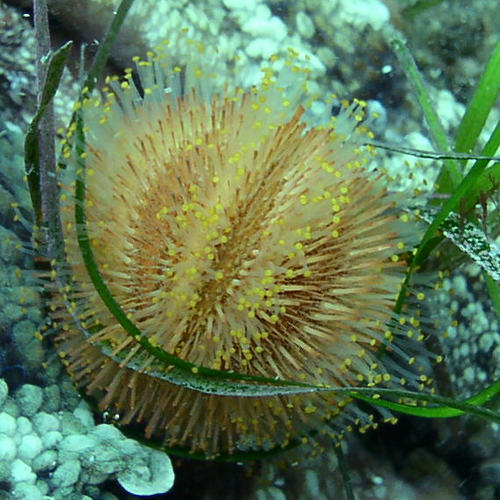

Scientific classification
- Kingdom: Animalia
- Phylum: Echinodermata
- Class: Echinoidea
- Order: Camarodonta
- Family: Temnopleuridae
- Genus: Holopneustes
- Species: H. inflatus

Binomial name
- Holopneustes inflatus Lütken, 1872

= Holopneustes inflatus =

Species of sea urchin

Holopneustes inflatus, the pink sea urchin or sea grass sea urchin is a species of sea urchin of the family Temnopleuridae.

Pink Sea Urchins are found in southern Australia, in New South Wales, Victoria, South Australia, Western Australia and Tasmania. The habitat is inter-tidal rocky areas and coastal waters up to a depth of 75 metres. Often seen amongst kelp. A small and delicate urchin, food is a variety of plants and dead animals.

The test diameter is up to 5 centimetres, usually brightly coloured and finely tuberculated. Spines are less than 5 millimetres long. Spines may be orange, dark red, pink or yellowish.
