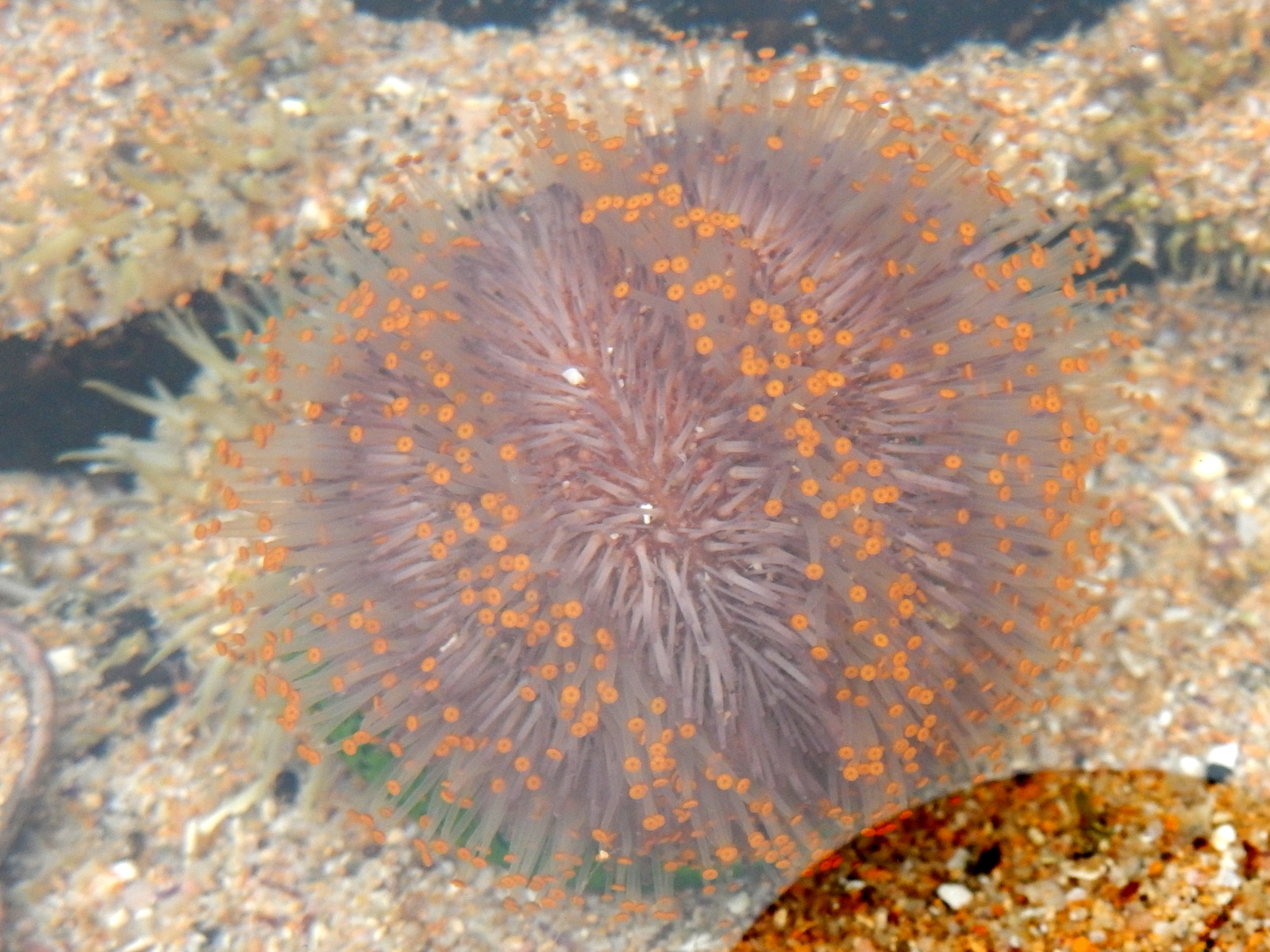
- Warriewood Beach, Australia

Scientific classification
- Kingdom: Animalia
- Phylum: Echinodermata
- Class: Echinoidea
- Order: Camarodonta
- Family: Temnopleuridae
- Genus: Holopneustes
- Species: H. purpurascens

Binomial name
- Holopneustes purpurascens A. Agassiz, 1872

= Holopneustes purpurascens =

Species of urchin

Holopneustes purpurascens is a species of sea urchin found in south eastern Australia. This species is sometimes found wrapped in kelp or sea grass. It is about the size of a golf ball when fully grown, with a distinct purple or lavender colour.
