= Amblypneustes grandis =

Scientific classification
- Kingdom: Animalia
- Phylum: Echinodermata
- Class: Echinoidea
- Order: Camarodonta
- Family: Temnopleuridae
- Genus: Amblypneustes
- Species: A. grandis

Binomial name
- Amblypneustes grandis Clark, 1912

Species of sea urchin

Amblypneustes grandis is a species of sea urchin of the family Temnopleuridae. Their armour is covered with spines. It is in the genus Amblypneustes and lives in the sea. Amblypneustes grandis was first scientifically described in 1912 by Hubert Lyman Clark.
