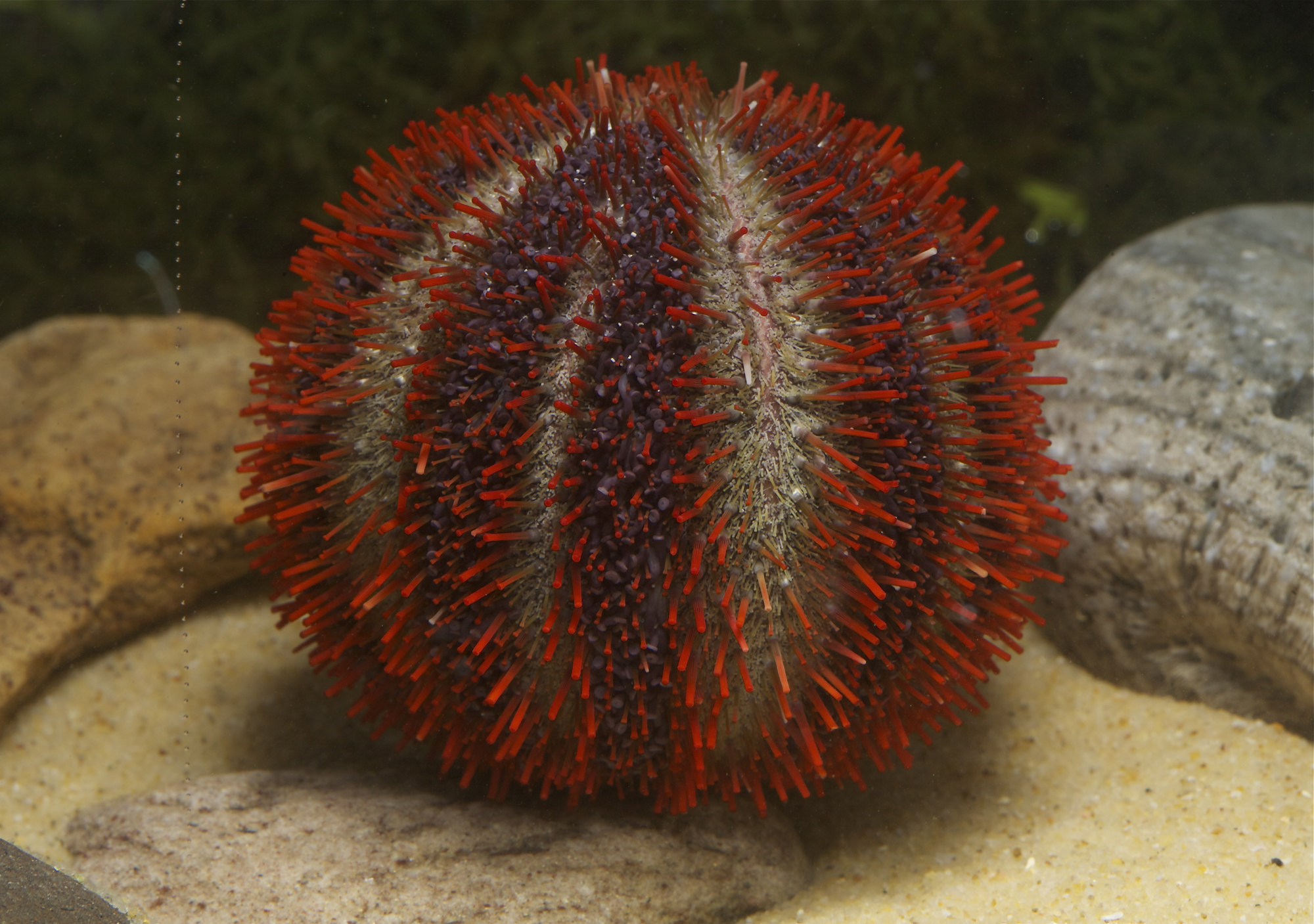

Scientific classification
- Kingdom: Animalia
- Phylum: Echinodermata
- Class: Echinoidea
- Order: Camarodonta
- Family: Temnopleuridae
- Genus: Holopneustes
- Species: H. porosissimus

Binomial name
- Holopneustes porosissimus L. Agassiz in L. Agassiz & Desor, 1846

= Holopneustes porosissimus =

Species of sea urchin

Holopneustes porosissimus, the short-spined urchin, is a species of sea urchin within the family Temnopleuridae. It is found in southern regions of Australia, excluding Tasmania.

Spines are red, the test is a greenish-grey, and the surface is covered with secondary tubercles. Diameter of up to 8 centimeters. It is common in waters from 0 - 30 meters in depth.
