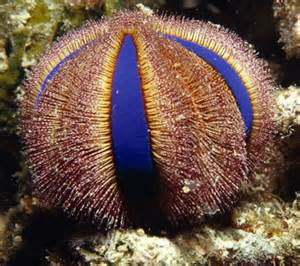
- Mespilia globulus. Note the radial symmetry and the presence and distribution of the spines.

Scientific classification
- Kingdom: Animalia
- Phylum: Echinodermata
- Class: Echinoidea
- Order: Camarodonta
- Family: Temnopleuridae
- Genus: Mespilia; Desor in L. Agassiz & Desor, 1846
- Species: M. globulus

Binomial name
- Mespilia globulus (Linnaeus, 1758)

Synonyms
- List: Cidaris granulata Leske, 1778; Echinus alternatus Deslongchamps, 1824; Echinus atternatus Bory de Saint Vincent in Bruguière, 1827; Echinus globulus Linnaeus, 1758; Echinus punctiferus Bory de Saint Vincent in Bruguière, 1827; Mespilia globula (Linnaeus, 1758); Mespilia globulus albida H.L. Clark, 1925; Mespilia globulus pellocrica H.L. Clark, 1912; Mespilia globulus var. albida H.L. Clark, 1925; Mespilia globulus var. whitmaei Bell, 1881; Mespilia globulus whitmaei Bell, 1881; Mespilia levituberculatus Yoshiwara, 1898; Mespilia microtuberculata Lambert & Thiéry, 1910; Mespilia whitmaei Bell, 1881; Salmacopsis pulchellimus Yoshiwara, 1898

= Mespilia =

Genus of sea urchins

Mespilia globulus, the globular sea urchin, sphere sea urchin, or tuxedo urchin (trade name), is a sea urchin occurring in tropical shallow reef habitats. The specific name refers to a small ball or spherule, describing its overall shape/morphology. It is the only species in the genus Mespilia.

== Description ==
The species can have a diameter of up to 5 cm (2.0 in). It can be recognized by its radial symmetry and relatively small spines (reaching lengths of up to 2 cm), usually brown, red or dark in color. The body features ten vertical zones that are not covered in spines which are distinct due to their vibrant shades of blue/green and can be described as having a velvety texture.

== Distribution and habitat ==
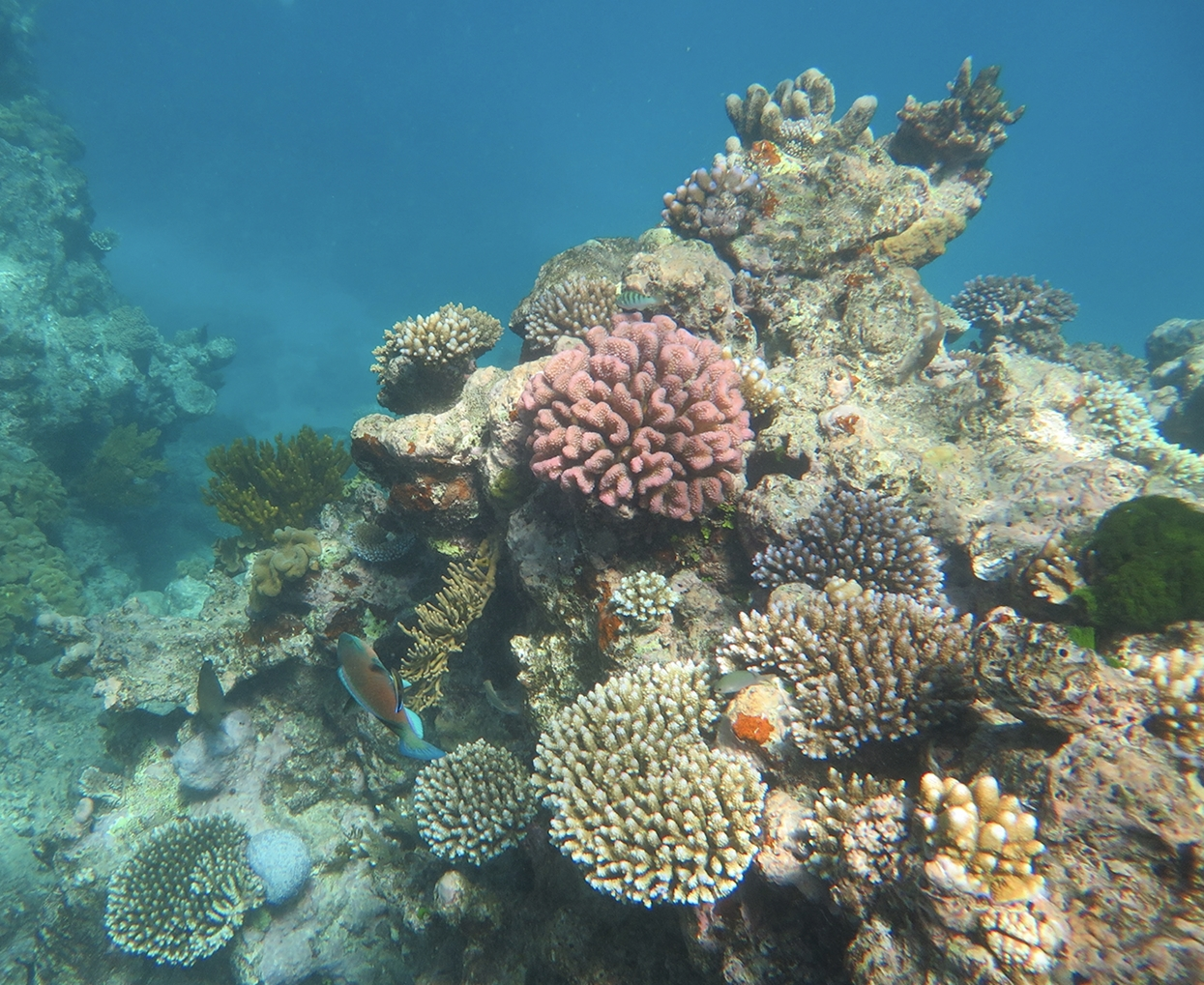
Mespilia globulus can commonly be found in shallow water, tropical, reef climates such as those in the Indo-Pacific.

They mainly inhabit shallow water reefs, coral rubble, and seagrass bed environments, generally at depths of 0–200 meters (660 ft). They occur in shallow, tropical waters in the Indo-Pacific and Indian Ocean as well as the south west coast of the western Pacific and Japan. During the breeding season, Mespilia globulus can be found abundantly near the coast, but are not as common there other times of the year as they migrate slightly off the coast when not breeding.

== Behaviors ==
Sea urchins feed in coral reef systems, seagrass beds, and fields of coral rubble by 'grazing', eating organic material that has settled or is growing on structure or on the sea floor, while exhibiting nocturnal foraging behaviors. They remain hidden in the coral structure or rocks present in habitat during the day. Recent studies have shown that the presence of 'grazing' feeders, such as Mespilia globulus, significantly increases the survival and growth size of the corals. However, increased Mespilia globulus density has a negative effect on urchin growth as a result of limited food availability.

This species has also been observed to agglutinate debris from its environment in an attempt to camouflage or protect itself. In the pet industry, M. globulus are said to be stressed or sick if they are not carrying any debris on their test. M. globulus has also been observed living in symbiosis with other marine invertebrates, such as crabs, and can be parasitized by some gastropods.

== Commercial use ==
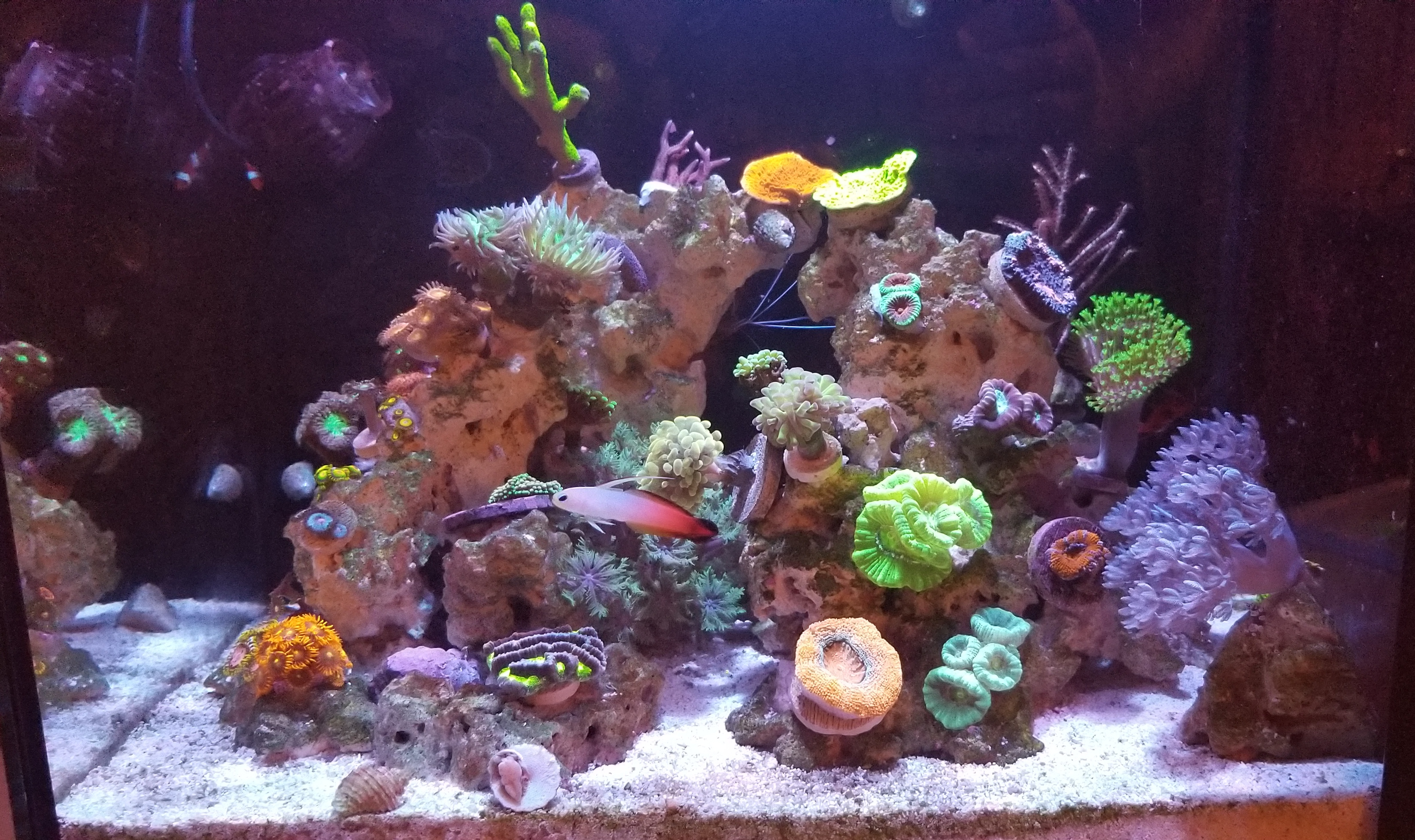
M. globulus are commonly purchased by saltwater-aquarium enthusiasts.

Mespilia globulus are commonly harvested and bred to be sold commercially as they are popular organisms to be put in recreational aquariums due to their vibrant colors and interesting morphology. They are popular for recreational aquariums as they are low-maintenance, and generally do not harm other organisms present. Currently, the pet industry relies on wild-caught M. globulus , as there are only several reports of successfully breeding them in captivity.

== Reproduction and life cycle ==
Like all sea urchins, Mespilia globulus is gonochoric (male and female sexes). Breeding season is typically from July to September in the Pacific and Indian Oceans. Fertilization is often external and brooding is also common, where the eggs are held either on the peristome or deep into the concavities on the petaloid. Clouds of sperm and eggs are released by the organisms and fertilization occurs in the water column. It is expected that in the future ocean acidification will threaten the sea urchins current process of reproduction.
