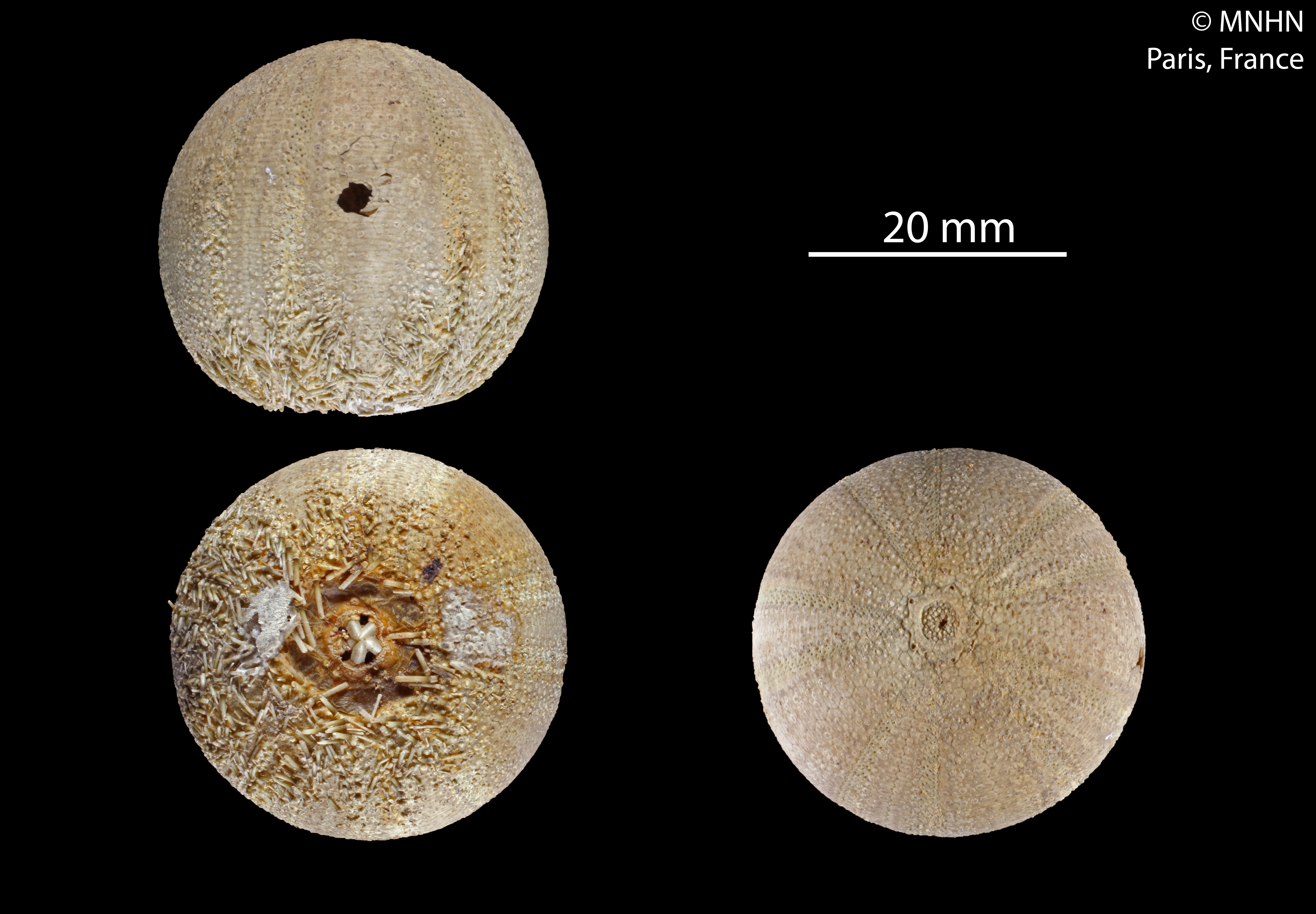

Scientific classification
- Domain: Eukaryota
- Kingdom: Animalia
- Phylum: Echinodermata
- Class: Echinoidea
- Order: Camarodonta
- Family: Temnopleuridae
- Genus: Amblypneustes
- Species: A. formosus

Binomial name
- Amblypneustes formosus Valenciennes, 1846

= Amblypneustes formosus =

Species of sea urchin

Amblypneustes formosus is a species of sea urchin of the family Temnopleuridae. Their armour is covered with spines. It is in the genus Amblypneustes and lives in the sea. Amblypneustes formosus was first scientifically described in 1846 by Valenciennes.
