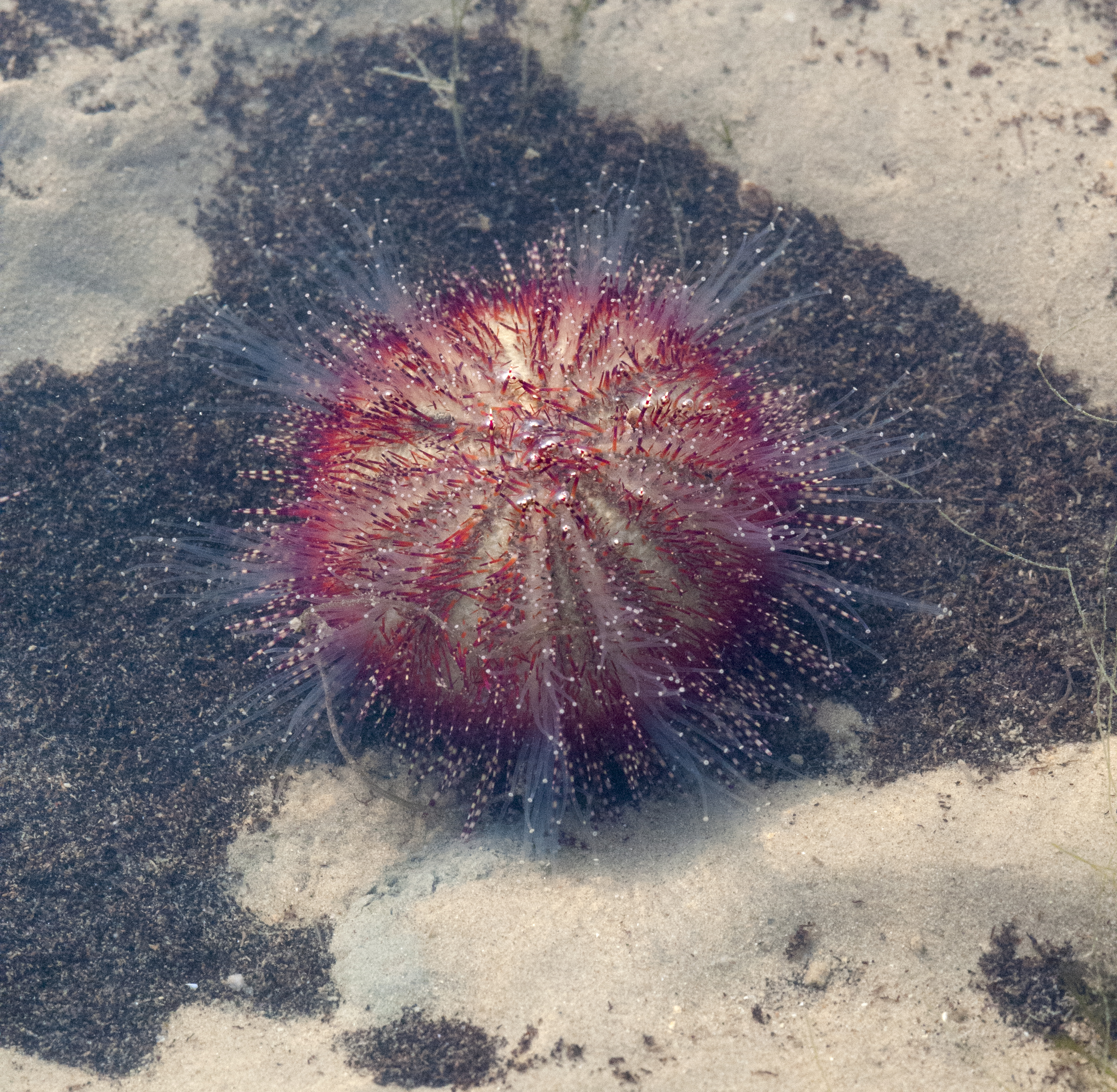
- Salmacis bicolor on the East Coast Park shore of Singapore.
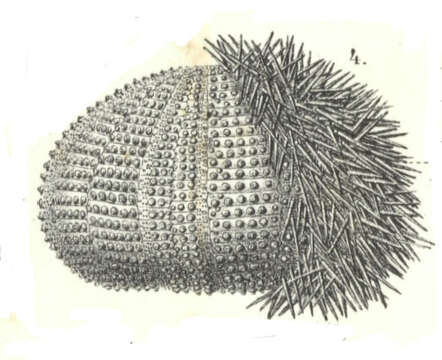
- Figured Specimen of Salmacis bicolor

Scientific classification
- Kingdom: Animalia
- Phylum: Echinodermata
- Class: Echinoidea
- Order: Camarodonta
- Family: Temnopleuridae
- Genus: Salmacis; L. Agassiz, 1841

Type species
- Salmacis bicolor Louis Agassiz, 1841

Species
- See text

= Salmacis (echinoderm) =

Genus of sea urchins

Salmacis is a genus of sea urchins in the family Temnopleuridae. Members of Salmacis are found primarily in tropical and subtropical marine waters across the Indo-Pacific region, including coastal areas of Indonesia, Malaysia, Philippines, Singapore, Thailand, Vietnam, Sri Lanka, India, Australia, and parts of East Africa. Some habitats include shallow waters of seagrass meadows, sandy substrates, and coral reefs. They can be found at depths ranging from intertidal zones to 90 meters below sea level.

== Description ==
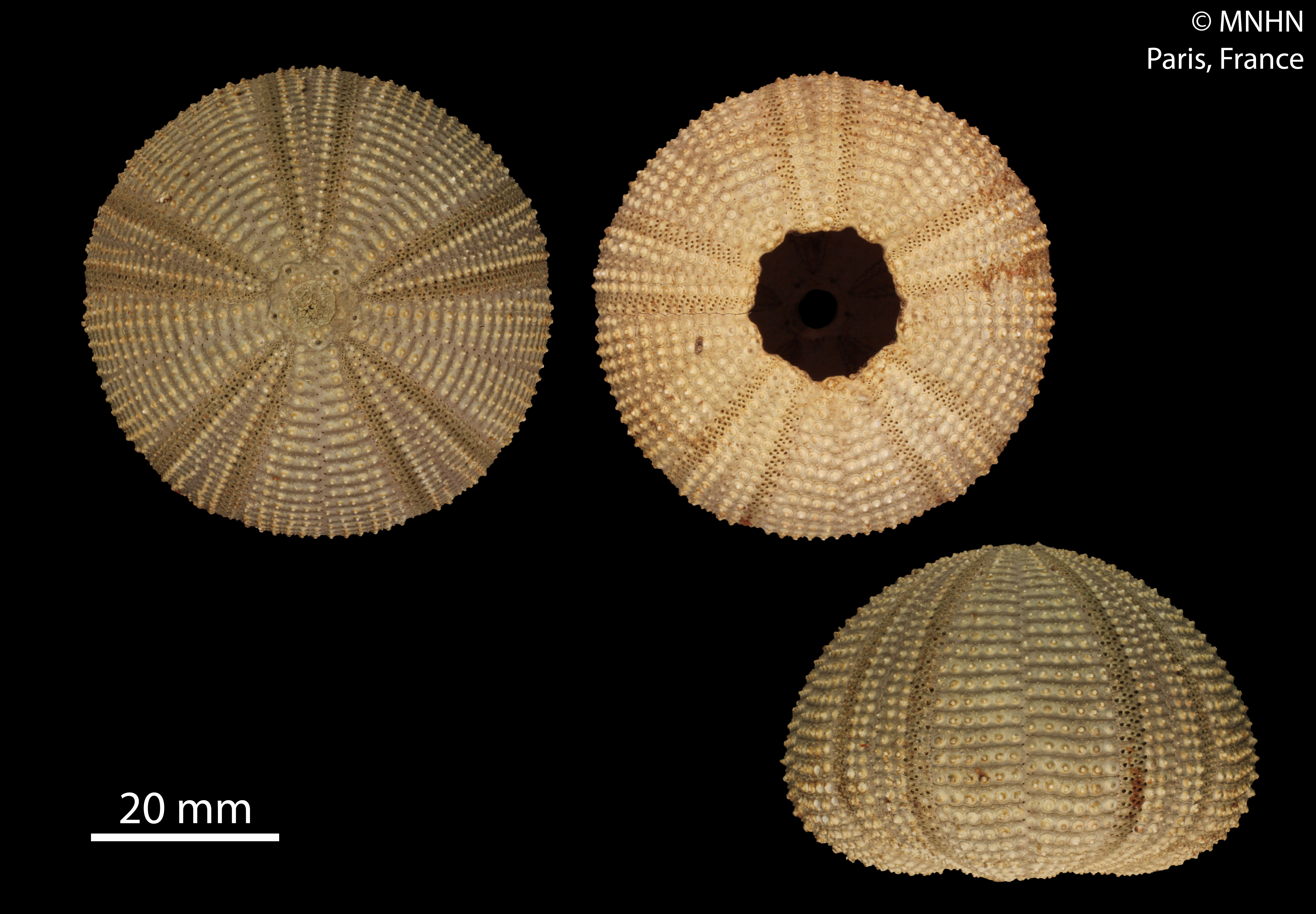
Salmacis bicolor test

The original description of Salmacis was recorded by Louis Agassiz in 1841, with the type species Salmacis bicolor. Salmacis urchins have hemispherical shells (tests) that are globular or subconical in shape. Their bodies are covered with short, thick, but sharp spines (radiole), and pedicellariae to deter predators. Their bodies exhibit pentaradial symmetry, with fivefold organization radiating from a central axis that connects the mouth (peristome) on the lower, oral surface to the anus (periproct) positioned at the upper aboral apex. Ambulacral pores are arranged in pairs, with crenulated tubercles forming several vertical rows which appear as horizontal series on each interambulacral plate. Small pits or angular pores are located at the junctions of the coronal plates. The masticatory apparatus is similar to other genera like Diadema and Echinothuriids, except for the compass depressor, which ends in a spatula-shaped tip.

== Diet ==
Like other sea urchins in the class Echinoidea, Salmacis urchins are omnivorous scavengers and detritus feeders. Their diets consists of algae and soft-bodied organisms like sea pens, bryozoans, and jellyfish.

== Reproduction ==
Salmacis urchins are dioecious with separate male and female sexes. They reproduce through external fertilization. Their eggs are retained either on the mouth (peristome), near the anus (periproct), or nestled deep within the depressions of the petaloid regions. Their gonads serve both reproduction and nutrient storage functions.

== Morphology ==
Members of the genus can be differentiated based on their coloration. For example, Salmacis bicolor is distinctive by its two-toned coloration. On the other hand, species like Salmacis sphaeroides are predominantly white or olive-green, while its spines are green with reddish-brown, purple, white, or green brands.

== Species ==
These are species according to the Global Biodiversity Information Facility and World Register of Marine Species. Species like Salmacis sphaeroides and Salmacis bicolor are distributed across the Indo-Pacific Ocean, scattered across coastal areas in Southern China, Southern Japan, Vietnam, Malaysia, and Singapore. Salmacis virgulata was found and recorded in Sri Lanka. Salmacis belli can be found along the coasts of Northern Australia.

- Salmacis belli Döderlein, 1902
- Salmacis bicolor L. Agassiz in L. Agassiz & Desor, 1846
- Salmacis nuda Currie, 1930
- Salmacis roseoviridis Koehler, 1927
- Salmacis rubricincta H.L. Clark, 1925
- Salmacis sphaeroides (Linnaeus, 1758)
- Salmacis virgulata L. Agassiz in L. Agassiz & Desor, 1846
