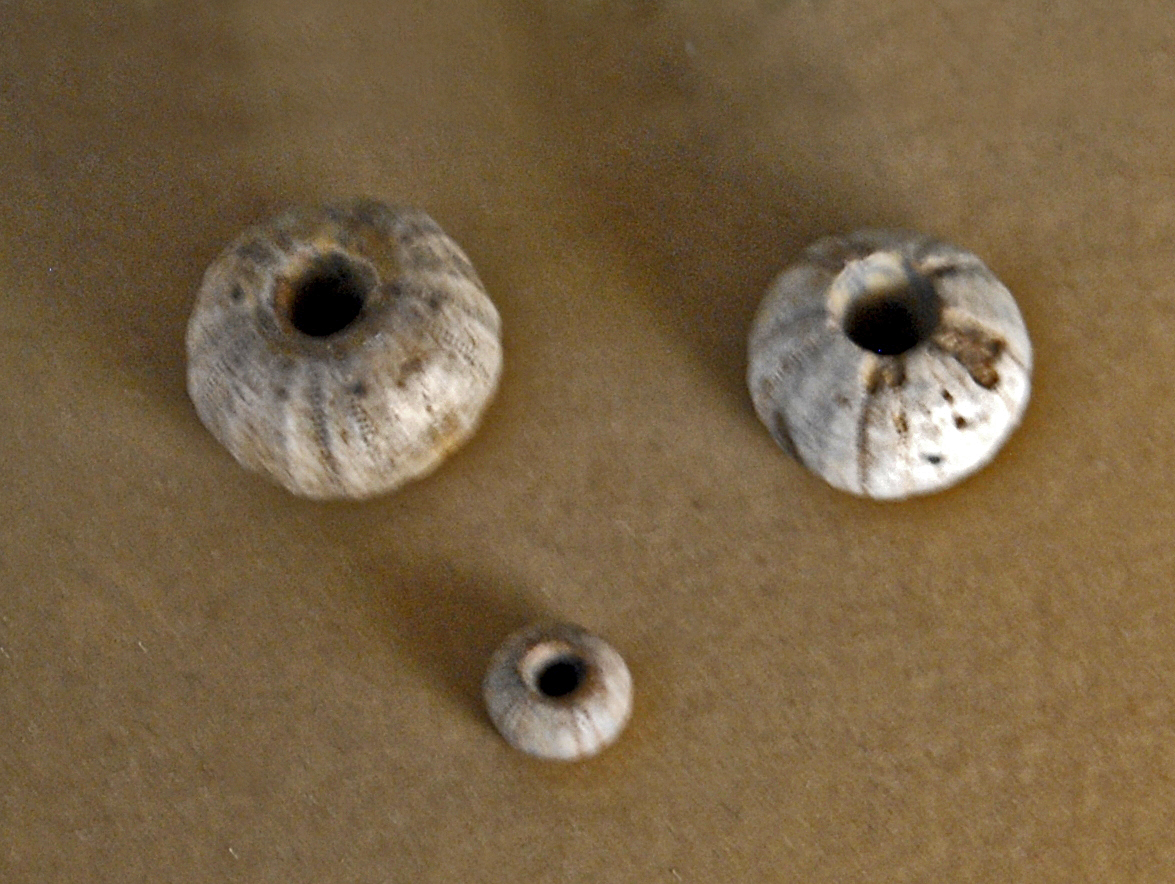
- Echinopsis from Sudan, perforated specimen to be threaded. On display at Galerie de paléontologie et d'anatomie comparée in Paris

Scientific classification
- Kingdom: Animalia
- Phylum: Echinodermata
- Class: Echinoidea
- Order: Camarodonta
- Infraorder: Temnopleuridea
- Family: †Glyphocyphidae; Duncan 1889

= Glyphocyphidae =

Glyphocyphidae Temporal range: Cretaceous–Paleogene

Extinct family of sea urchins

Glyphocyphidae is an extinct family of sea urchins in the class Echinoidea.

These slow-moving low-level epifaunal grazers lived from the Cretaceous to the Paleogene periods (136.4 to 48.6 Ma).

== Genera ==
- Ambipleurus Lambert, 1932
- Arachniopleurus Duncan & Sladen, 1882
- Dictyopleurus Duncan & Sladen, 1882
- Echinopsis
- Glyphocyphus
- Hemidiadema
- Rachiosoma
- Rhabdopleurus Cotteau, 1893
