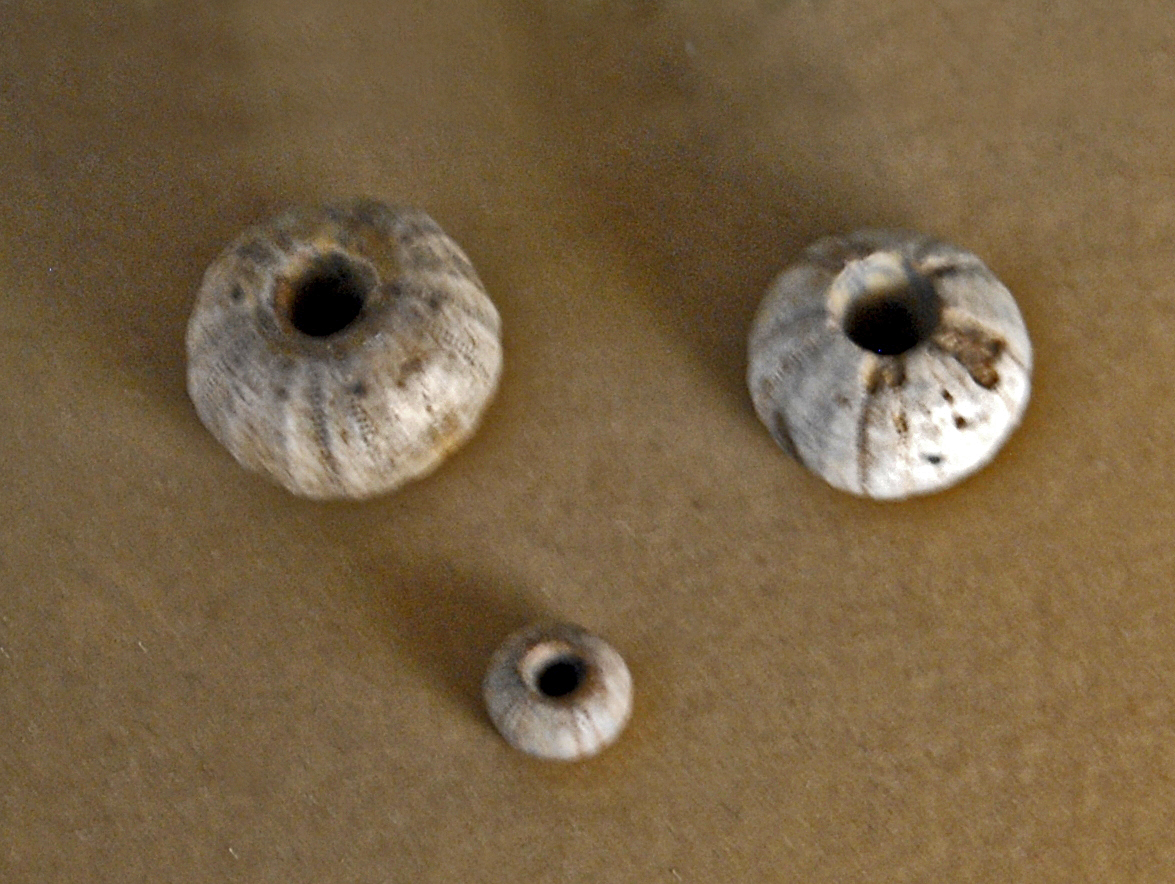
- Echinopsis from Sudan, perforated specimen to be threaded. On display at Galerie de paléontologie et d'anatomie comparée in Paris

Scientific classification
- Kingdom: Animalia
- Phylum: Echinodermata
- Class: Echinoidea
- Order: Camarodonta
- Family: †Glyphocyphidae
- Genus: †Echinopsis; Agassiz, 1840

= Echinopsis (echinoderm) =

Echinopsis Temporal range: Cretaceous–Paleogene

Extinct genus of sea urchins

Echinopsis is an extinct genus of sea urchins in the class Echinoidea.

These slow-moving low-level epifaunal grazers lived from the Cretaceous to the Paleogene periods (125.45 - 5.332 Ma). Fossils of this genus have been found in the sediments of Madagascar, Pakistan, Senegal, Sudan, United States and Switzerland.
