= Fontana Greca =

Coordinates: 40°3′22.08″N 17°58′51.78″E

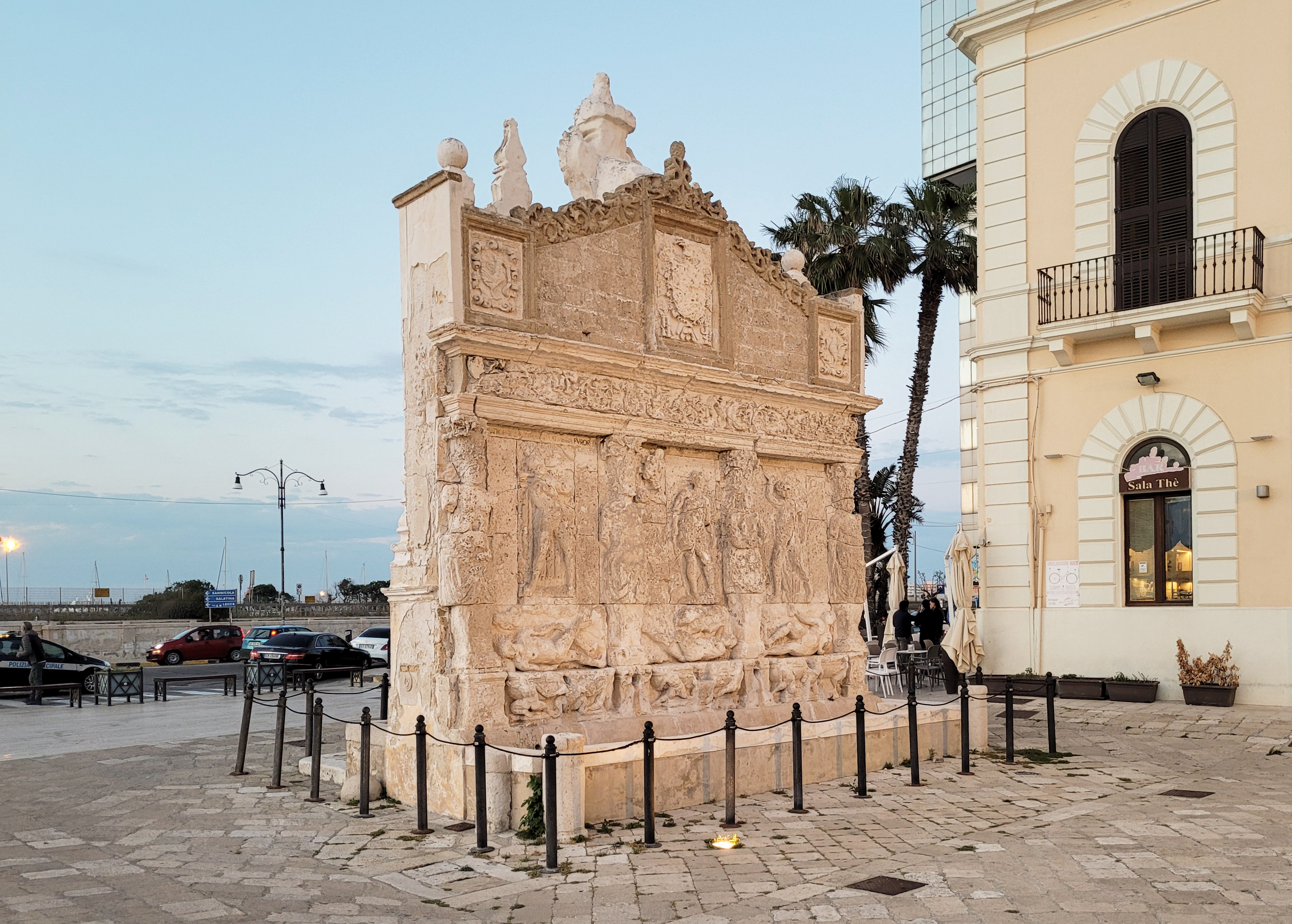
The Fontana Greca of Gallipoli

The Fontana Greca ("Greek Fountain") is a fountain located in Gallipoli in the province of Lecce, in Apulia, southern Italy.

== Description ==
The fountain stands near the bridge adjacent to the castle, in the part that connects the old town with the new part of town. This fountain is famous, because for a long time it was thought to constitute the oldest fountain in Italy. Originally, it was thought that the fountain dated back to the third century BC, but after long studies the architectural work has been adapted, considering the right place of its creation was during the Renaissance. However, not all are of the same opinion and the exact dating still remains a mystery. Originally the fountain stood in the spa area, which is currently called "fontanelle", but in 1548 it was transported near the ancient Church of St. Nicholas, no longer visible. Subsequently, in 1560, the fountain was again dismantled and rebuilt in its present location.

Its façade is divided into three blocks of four caryatids that support the architrave with a rich decor. Everything reaches a height of approximately five meters. In the three compartments formed between the four caryatids, bas-reliefs enrich the work. These bas-reliefs depicting the mythological metamorphosis of Dirce, Salmacis, and Byblis.

On top of the façade, built in a later period and probably dating from 1765, were placed the arms of the city of Gallipoli, an inscription in Latin and the insignia of King Charles III of Spain.
