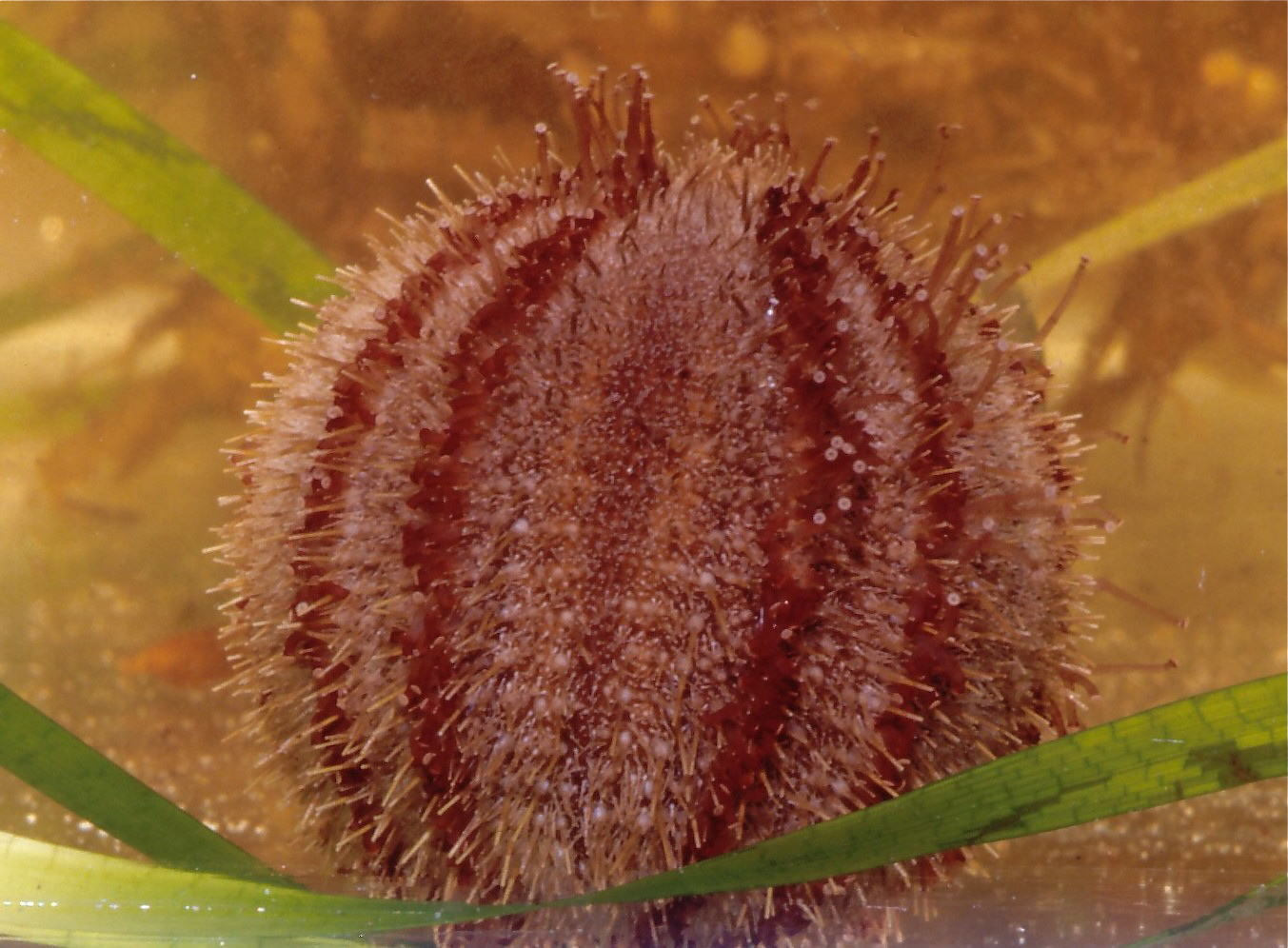
- Amblypneustes ovum

Scientific classification
- Kingdom: Animalia
- Phylum: Echinodermata
- Class: Echinoidea
- Order: Camarodonta
- Family: Temnopleuridae
- Genus: Amblypneustes; L. Agassiz, 1841

Type species
- Echinus griseus Blainville, 1825

= Amblypneustes =

Genus of sea urchins

Amblypneustes is a genus of sea urchins, belonging to the family Temnopleuridae.

== Species ==
- †Amblypneustes corrali Lambert & Roig in Sánchez Roig, 1949 – Cuba (Upper Oligocene)
- Amblypneustes elevatus (Hutton, 1872)
- Amblypneustes formosus Valenciennes, 1846
- Amblypneustes grandis H. L. Clark, 1912
- Amblypneustes leucoglobus Döderlein, 1914
- Amblypneustes ovum (Lamarck, 1816)
- Amblypneustes pallidus (Lamarck, 1816)
- Amblypneustes pulchellus (H. L. Clark, 1928)

== See also ==
- Holopneustes – a closely related genus
