= Periproct =

Last body segment in Annelids

The periproct is the final body segment in annelid worms. The anus is located on this segment. The term also refers to the small region surrounding the anus of the sea urchin.

== See also ==
- Prostomium
- Earthworm
- Sea urchin
