= Salmacis (fountain) =

Ancient fountain or spring

Coordinates: 37°01′48.7″N 27°25′15.5″E

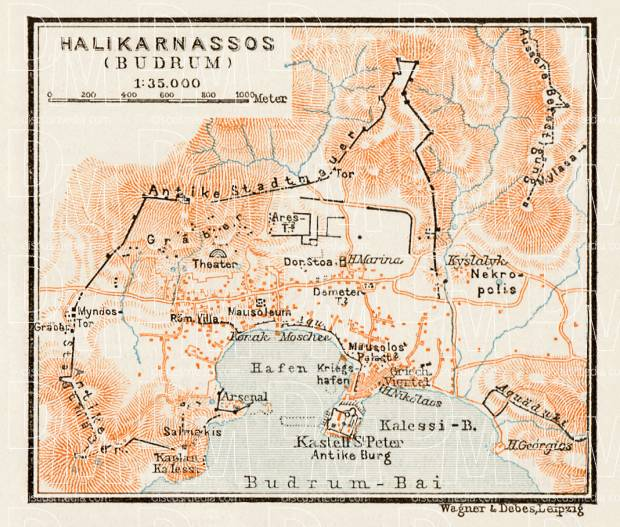
Ancient site map showing the location of Salmacis fountain and Kaplan Kalesi where the 'Salmakis inscription' was discovered.

Salmacis or Salmakis was the name of a fountain or spring located in modern-day Bodrum, Turkey, whose tutelary goddess in the ancient Greek tradition was the freshwater nymph Salmacis. According to some classical authors, the water had the reputation of making men effeminate, soft, and woman-like. This was considered denigrating to men subjected to it for making them take a passive role in sexual relations. Ovid told a version of the myth in Metamorphoses, in which Hermaphroditus calls on Venus and Mercury to curse the waters. Waters that transform men into women are a recurring motif in Near East folklore.

== History ==
Salmacis was a fountain, located near the Mausoleum of Halicarnassus. In classical times, it had:

the slanderous repute, for what reason I do not know, of making effeminate all who drink from it. It seems that the effeminacy of man is laid to the charge of the air or of the water; yet it is not these, but rather riches and wanton living, that are the cause of effeminacy. —Strabo Geography XIV.2.16

This was believed by contemporary Hellenic people. However, the power of the spring was rejected by other Romans, such as the architect Vitruvius

there is a mistaken idea that this spring infects those who drink of it... it cannot be that the water makes men effeminate. —Vitruvius De architectura 2.8.12

In Book IV of his poem Metamorphoses, Ovid recounts the myth of how the fountain came to be so in the story of the nymph Salmacis (after whom the fountain is, in this account, named), her attempted rape of Hermaphroditus, and his resultant change into an intersex being. Scholars such as Károly Kerényi have asserted that Ovid's account was not a classical one and that the story was invented by him.

== The Salmakis inscription ==
In 1995, the so-called 'Salmakis Inscription' was discovered by Turkish authorities on the promontory of Kaplan Kalesi, which juts out into the sea to the south-west of Bodrum harbour.

The inscription is a poem sixty lines long, partly damaged but mainly well preserved. It was carved into an ancient wall sometime during the Hellenistic period, likely the late 2nd or early 1st century BC. It is written in elegiac verse and the general theme is one of civilization. The first lines form the poet's invocation of the goddess Aphrodite, early in Aphrodite's story we encounter her son Hermaphroditus and the water nymph Salmacis:

Having settled the lovely promontory sung of as dear to the immortals

by the sweet stream of Salmakis, she (Halikarnassos) controls
the beautiful dwelling of the nymph who once received
our boy, Hermaphroditos, in her kindly arms
and bred him to become an extraordinary man, who invented matrimony
for mankind and was the first to fasten the matrimonial bed by law.
She in her turn under the sacred streams dripping in

the cave tempers the savage minds of men.

The inscription also contains a list of famous authors born in Halikarnassos. First on the list is the Greek historian Herodotos. It is now being housed in the Museum of Underwater Archaeology at Bodrum Castle.

== Music ==
The progressive rock band Genesis tells the story in "The Fountain of Salmacis", a track from their 1971 album Nursery Cryme.
