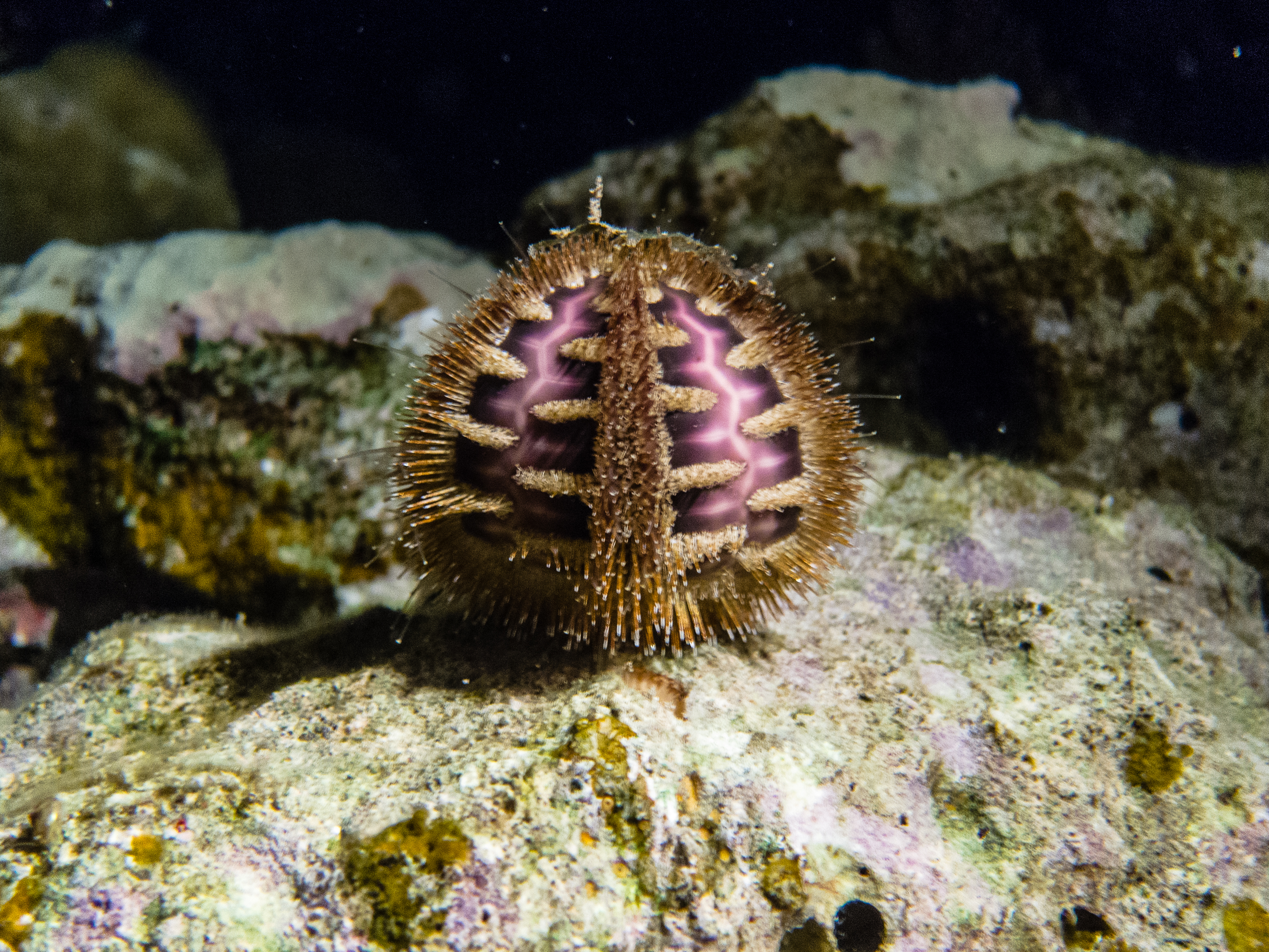
- Microcyphus rousseaui

Scientific classification
- Domain: Eukaryota
- Kingdom: Animalia
- Phylum: Echinodermata
- Class: Echinoidea
- Order: Camarodonta
- Infraorder: Temnopleuridea; Kroh & Smith, 2010

Families
- Glyphocyphidae †; Temnopleuridae; Trigonocidaridae; Zeuglopleuridae †

Synonyms
- Temnopleuroida Mortensen, 1942

= Temnopleuridea =

Temnopleuridea Temporal range: Upper Cretaceous–recent

Infraorder of sea urchins

Temnopleuridea is an infraorder of sea urchins in the order Camarodonta. They are distinguished from other sea urchins by the presence of large fused plates on top of the feeding lantern. The test is usually sculpted to some degree, and has perforated tubercles.

== Taxonomy ==
According to World Register of Marine Species:

- Family Glyphocyphidae Duncan, 1889 †
- Family Temnopleuridae A. Agassiz, 1872
- Family Trigonocidaridae Mortensen, 1903b
- Family Zeuglopleuridae Lewis, 1986 †

== Bibliography ==
- Barnes, Robert D. (1982). Invertebrate Zoology. Philadelphia, PA: Holt-Saunders International. p. 980. ISBN 978-0-03-056747-6.
- National History Museum. "Temnopleuroida".
