= Salmacis =

Nymph in Greek mythology

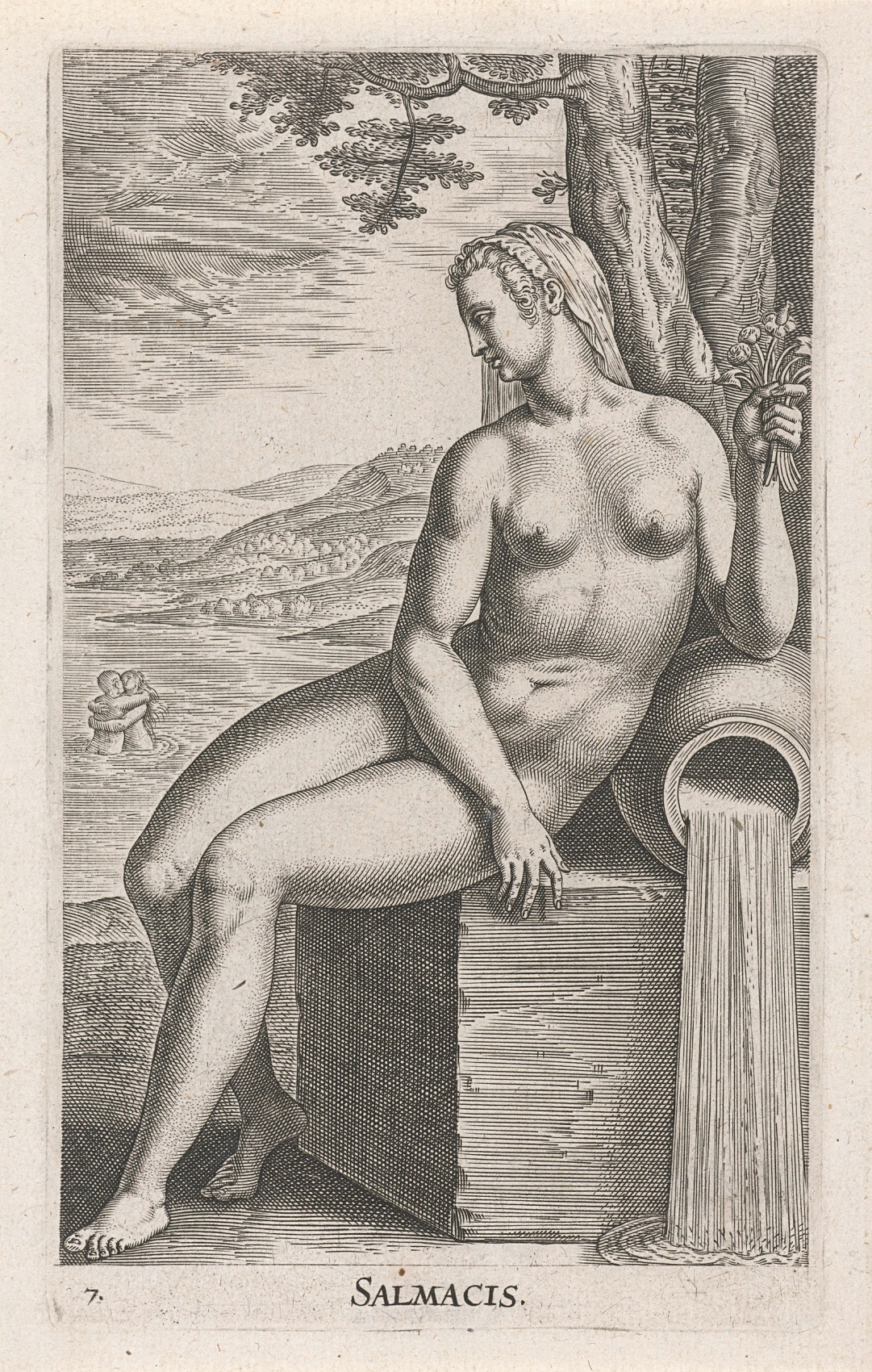
Water Nymph Salmacis, engraving by Philip Galle (1587)

Salmacis (Ancient Greek: Σαλμακίς) was a naiad of Greek mythology. She rejected the ways of the virginal Greek goddess Artemis in favour of vanity and idleness.

== Mythology ==
=== Ovid's version ===
Salmacis' attempted rape of Hermaphroditus is narrated in the fourth book of Ovid's Metamorphoses (see also Dercetis).

There dwelt a Nymph, not up for hunting or archery:
unfit for footraces. She the only Naiad not in Diana’s band.
Often her sisters would say: "Pick up a javelin, or
bristling quiver, and interrupt your leisure for the chase!"
But she would not pick up a javelin or arrows,
nor trade leisure for the chase.
Instead she would bathe her beautiful limbs and tend to her hair,
with her waters as a mirror.

— Ovid, Metamorphoses 4.306–312.

One day, Hermaphroditus went swimming in his pool. Upon seeing him, Salmacis was struck with love for him, approached him and confessed her love to him; but he was not interested, and demanded she leave. She did so, but her passion took her back, unable to stay away from him. As Hermaphroditus emerged from the pool, she threw herself at him, and forcibly kissed him as he tried to escape. Salmacis then cried to the gods and begged them to let them stay together forever; and the gods answered by fusing them together for all time, into a deity that had both male and female parts. She thus became one with Hermaphroditus and he then cursed the fountain to have the same effect on every other person who would bathe there.

=== Other versions ===
In a description found on the remains of a wall in Halicarnassus, Hermaphroditus' mother Aphrodite names Salmacis as the nymph who nursed and took care of an infant Hermaphroditus after his parents put him in her care, a very different version than the one presented by Ovid.

Lucian of Samosata also implies that Hermaphroditus was born like that, rather than becoming later in life against his will, and blames it on the identity of the boy's father Hermes.

== Salmacis fountain ==
Salmacis was the name of a fountain or spring located in modern-day Bodrum, Turkey. According to some classical authors, the water had the reputation of making men effeminate and soft. This legend lies at the heart of Ovid's tale of Salmacis and Hermaphroditus.

== Ancient art ==
A fresco in Room 10 of the Casa della Venere in Conchiglia (House of Venus in the Shell) in Pompeii depicts Eros standing in between Hermaphroditus and Salmacis. The fresco is possibly the earliest (before 79 AD) and the only ancient artwork of the water nymph before her union with Hermaphroditus.

== Post-Classical reception ==
=== Literature ===
Francis Beaumont, a poet and playwright, wrote a poem Salmacis and Hermaphroditus based on Ovid's work. The poem was published anonymously in London in 1602.

Girolamo Preti wrote an idyll, La Salmace, first published in 1608 and translated into French, Spanish, English and Latin.

Algernon Charles Swinburne's 1863 poem "Hermaphroditus", based on the Bernini sculpture of the same name in the Louvre, makes mention of Salmacis in the final stanza.

A novel of short stories by Italian writer Mario Soldati called Salmace (Salmacis), a title that spans the entire collection. In the story it tells of the transformation of a man into a woman, in a highly metaphorical context.

=== Sculpture ===
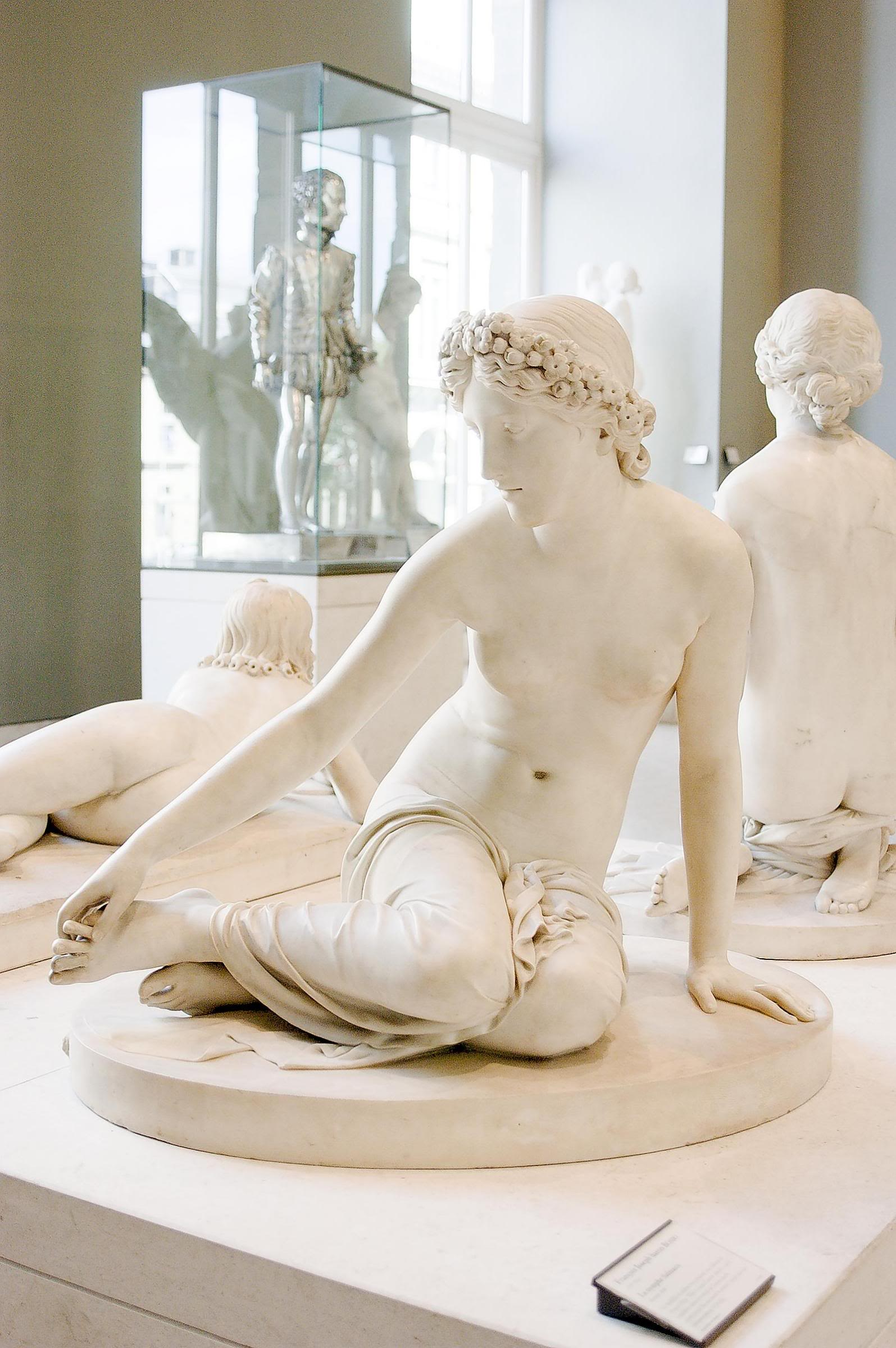
La nymphe Salmacis by François-Joseph Bosio, 1826 (Louvre)

A sculpture by François-Joseph Bosio, La nymphe Salmacis from 1826, can be seen on display at the Louvre Museum in Paris.

A sculpture by Sir Thomas Brock of Salmacis (aka The Bather Surprised) was designed in 1868. It was modelled and exhibited at the Royal Academy, London in 1869. A variety of porcelain replicas were made from 1875 and an example was exhibited at the Paris Exhibition of 1878.

The Fontana Greca ("Greek Fountain") is a fountain from the Renaissance period located in Gallipoli, southern Italy. The fountain has bas-reliefs depicting three metamorphoses in Greek mythology. The center bas-relief shows Eros flying beside Aphrodite, while Hermaphroditus and Salmacis are shown below laying together and embracing.

=== Painting ===
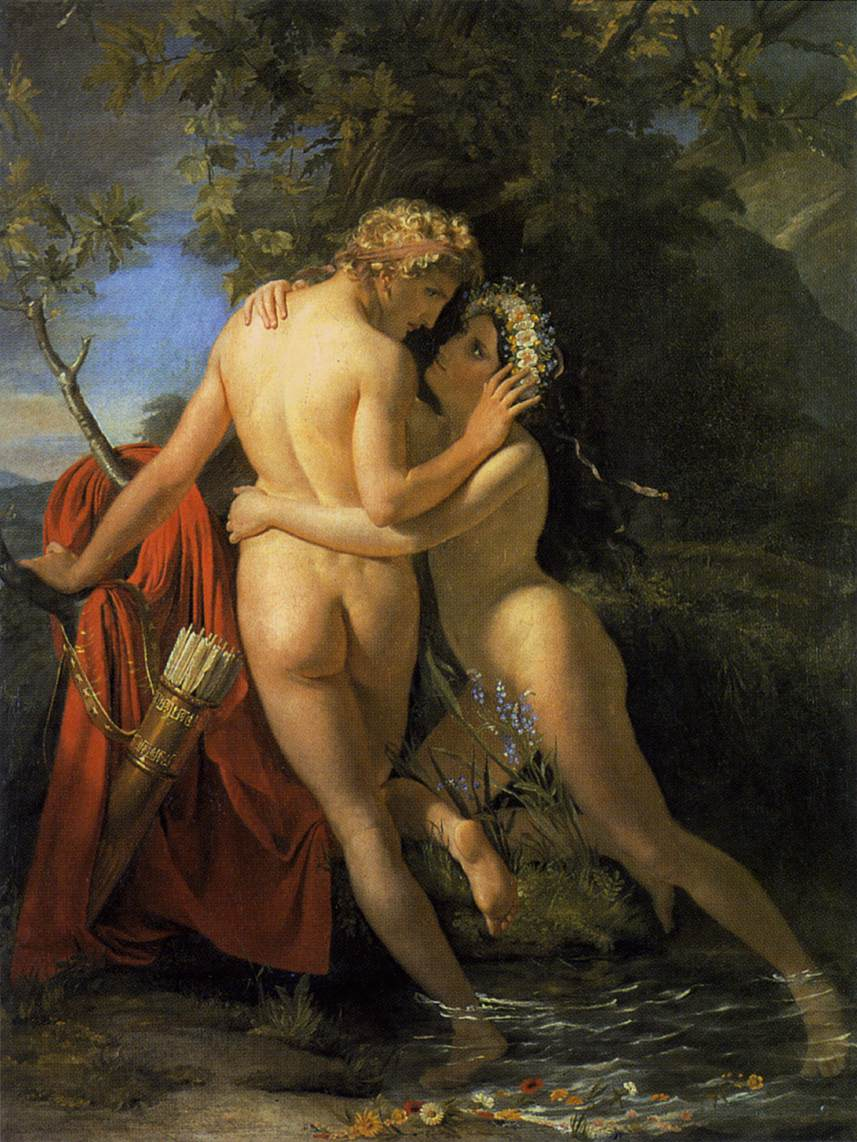
The Nymph Salmacis and Hermaphroditus by François-Joseph Navez (1829)

A painting of Salmacis in 1877 by French artist Charles Landelle was one of the most admired works at the Paris Exhibition according to The Art Journal of 1878. The painting depicts a startled Salmacis seated among reeds, clutching her drapery to her chest in alarm.

== Bibliography ==
- Lucian, Dialogues of the Gods; translated by Fowler, H W and F G. Oxford: The Clarendon Press. 1905.
- Ovid. Metamorphoses, Volume I: Books 1-8. Translated by Frank Justus Miller. Revised by G. P. Goold. Loeb Classical Library No. 42. Cambridge, Massachusetts: Harvard University Press, 1977, first published 1916. ISBN 978-0-674-99046-3.
