= Édouard Desor =

Swiss geologist and naturalist (1811-1882)

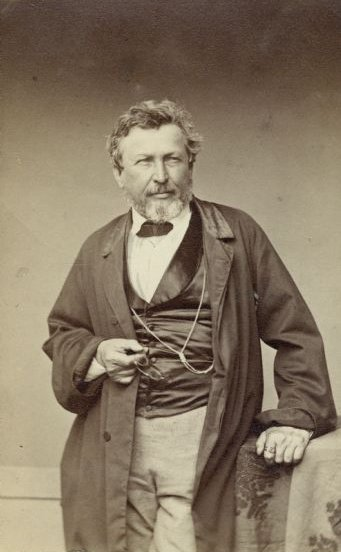
- Pierre Jean Édouard Desor in 1863
- Born: Pierre Jean Édouard Desor; 13 February 1811; Friedrichsdorf, Grand Duchy of Hesse
- Died: 23 February 1882 (aged 71); Nice, France
- Known for: Contributions to geology and anthropology
- Scientific career
- Fields: Geology, Naturalist, Anthropology

Pierre Jean Édouard Desor (13 February 1811, Friedrichsdorf, Grand Duchy of Hesse – 23 February 1882) was a Swiss geologist and naturalist.

== Biography ==
Desor studied law at Giessen and Heidelberg, was compromised in the republican movements of 1832/3 (see, for example, Hambach Festival and Frankfurter Wachensturm), and escaped to Paris. Here his attention was drawn to geology. He made excursions with Élie de Beaumont, and in 1837 met Louis Agassiz at a meeting of naturalists in Neufchâtel. With Gressli and Vogt, Desor became an active collaborator with Agassiz, studying palaeontology and glacial phenomena, and contributing the essays for vol. iii. of Agassiz's Monographie d'echinodermes vivants et fossiles (Neufchâtel, 1842). Desor also published Excursions et sejours dans les glaciers et les hautes régions des Alpes de M. Agassiz et de ses compagnons de voyage (Neufchâtel, 1844).

Together with James David Forbes, Desor ascended the Jungfrau in 1841. He was in a guided party on the first ascent of the Lauteraarhorn on 8 August 1842 and of the Rosenhorn summit of the Wetterhorn on 28 August 1844.

He spent a few years in the north of Europe, especially in Scandinavia, investigating the erratic phenomena peculiar to that region, From strata he examined in Denmark he introduced the term Danian in 1847, to characterize the oldest stage of the Paleogene. Desor accompanied Agassiz in 1847 to the United States, found employment in the coast survey, and made with Whitney, Foster, and Rogers a geological survey of the mineral district of Lake Superior.

Returning to Neufchâtel in 1852, he investigated with Gressli the orography of the Jura Mountains for industrial purposes. Desor became professor of geology at the academy of Neuchâtel, continued his studies on the structure of glaciers, but gave special attention to the study of Jurassic Echinoderms. He also investigated the old lake-habitations of Switzerland, and made important observations on the physical features of the Sahara. In 1862, he was elected as a member to the American Philosophical Society. He was elected a member of the American Antiquarian Society in 1871.

Having inherited considerable property he retired to Combe Varin in Val-de-Travers. He died in Nice on 23 February 1882.

== Works ==
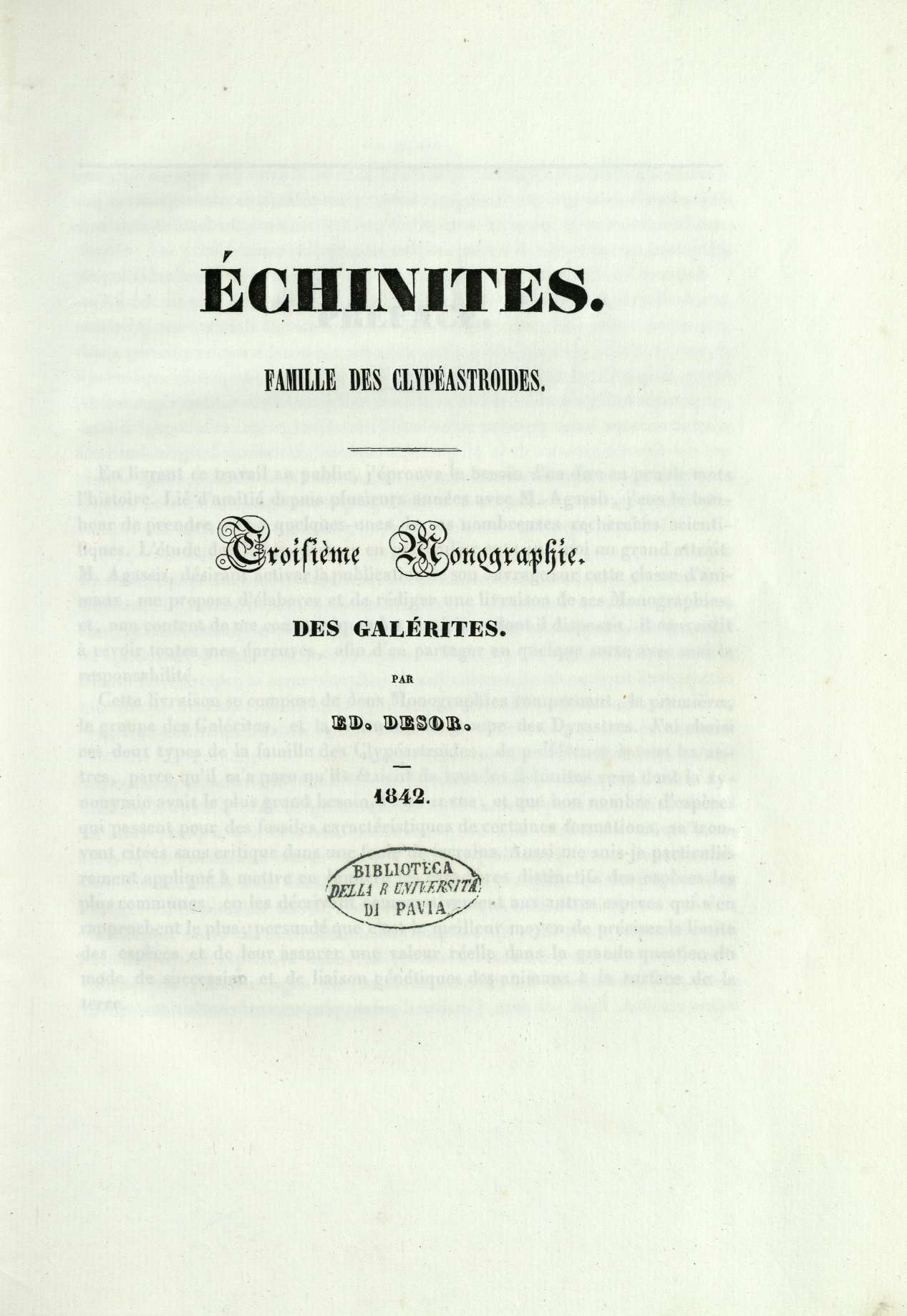
Échinites, 1842

His chief publications were:

- Échinites (in French). Neuchâtel. 1842.
- Synopsis des Échinides fossiles (1858)
- Aus Sahara und Atlas (Leipzig, 1865)
- Der Gebirgsbau der Alpen (1865)
- Die Pfahlbauten des Neuenburger Sees (1866)
- Échinologie helvétique (2 vols., Paris, 1868–1873, with Perceval de Loriol)
- Le paysage morainique (1875)

== Taxa named by Pierre Jean Édouard Desor ==
- Asterias forbesi - the Forbes Sea star.
