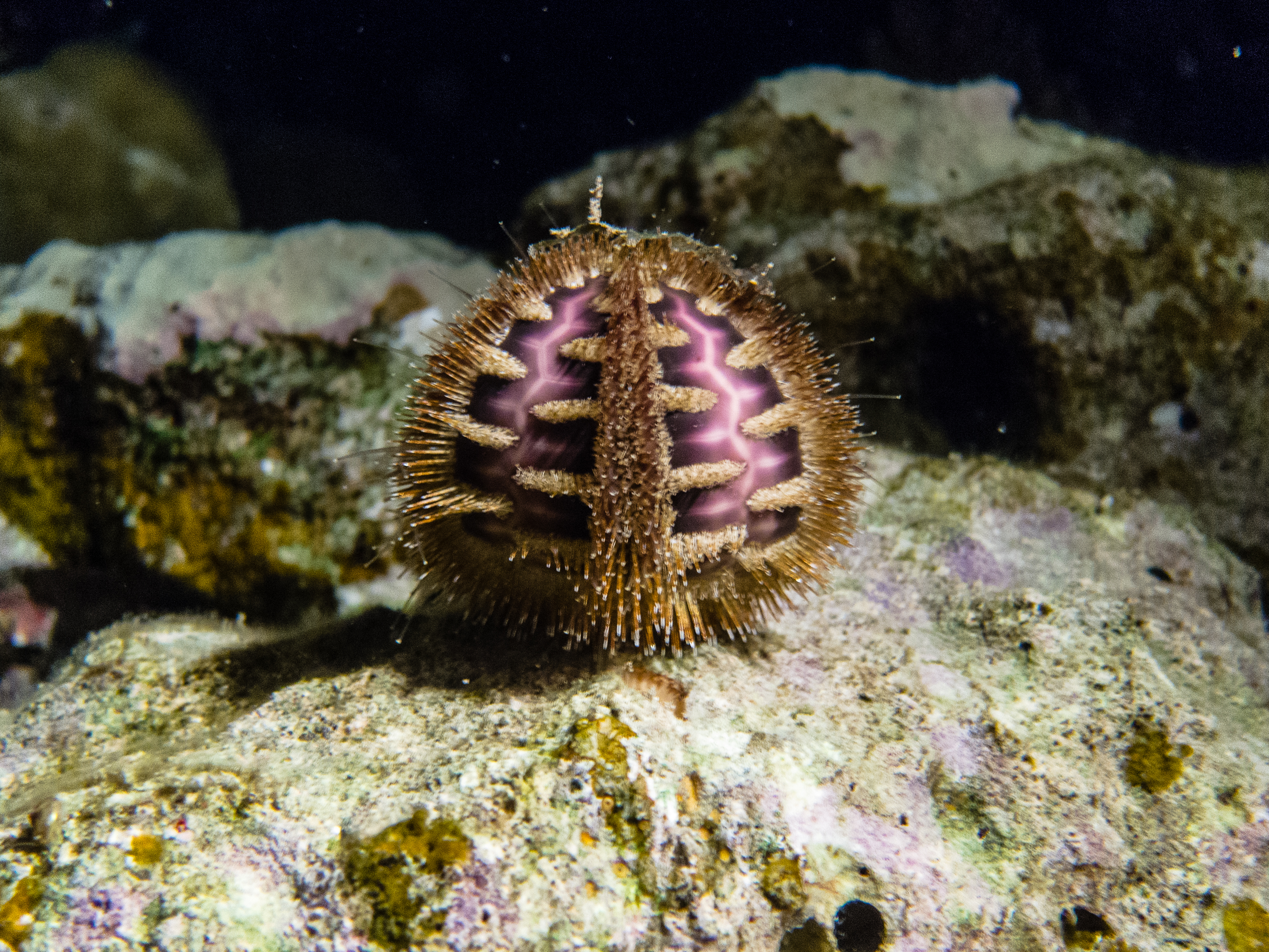

Scientific classification
- Kingdom: Animalia
- Phylum: Echinodermata
- Class: Echinoidea
- Order: Camarodonta
- Infraorder: Temnopleuridea
- Family: Temnopleuridae; A. Agassiz, 1872

= Temnopleuridae =

Family of sea urchins

Temnopleuridae is a family of sea urchins in the infraorder Temnopleuridea.

== Genera ==
- Amblypneustes L. Agassiz, 1841
- Erbechinus Jeannet, 1935
- Holopneustes L. Agassiz, 1841
- Mespilia Desor in L. Agassiz & Desor, 1846
- Microcyphus L. Agassiz in L. Agassiz & Desor, 1846
- Opechinus Desor, 1856
- Paratrema Koehler, 1927
- †Placentinechinus Borghi & Garilli, 2016
- Printechinus Koehler, 1927
- Pseudechinus Mortensen, 1903
- Salmaciella Mortensen, 1942
- Salmacis L. Agassiz, 1841
- Temnopleurus L. Agassiz, 1841
- Temnotrema A. Agassiz, 1864
