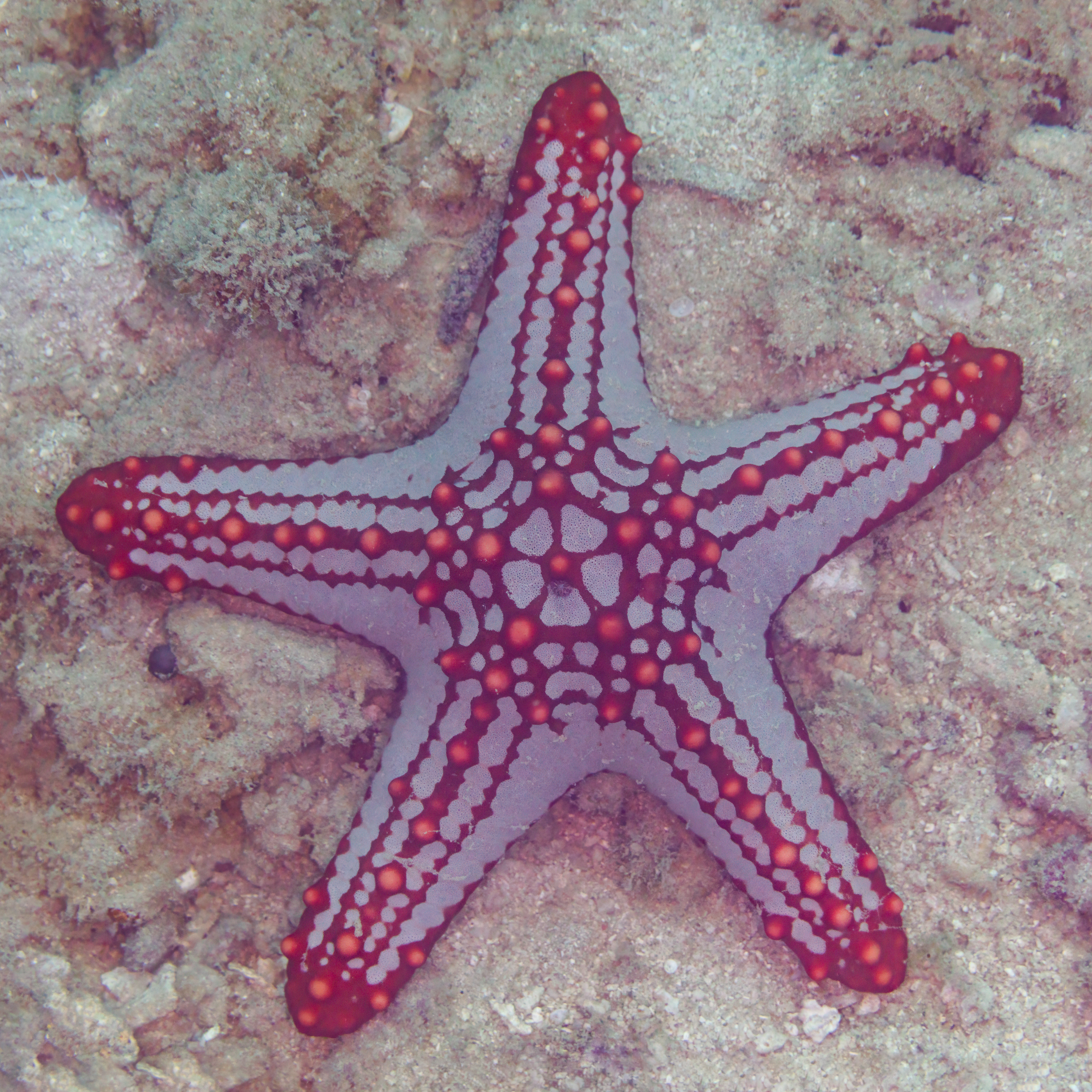

Scientific classification
- Kingdom: Animalia
- Phylum: Echinodermata
- Class: Asteroidea
- Order: Valvatida
- Family: Oreasteridae
- Genus: Protoreaster
- Species: P. lincki

Binomial name
- Protoreaster lincki (Blainville, 1834)

= Protoreaster lincki =

Species of starfish

Protoreaster lincki, the red knob sea star, red spine star, African sea star, or the African red knob sea star, is a species of starfish from the Indian Ocean.

== Description ==
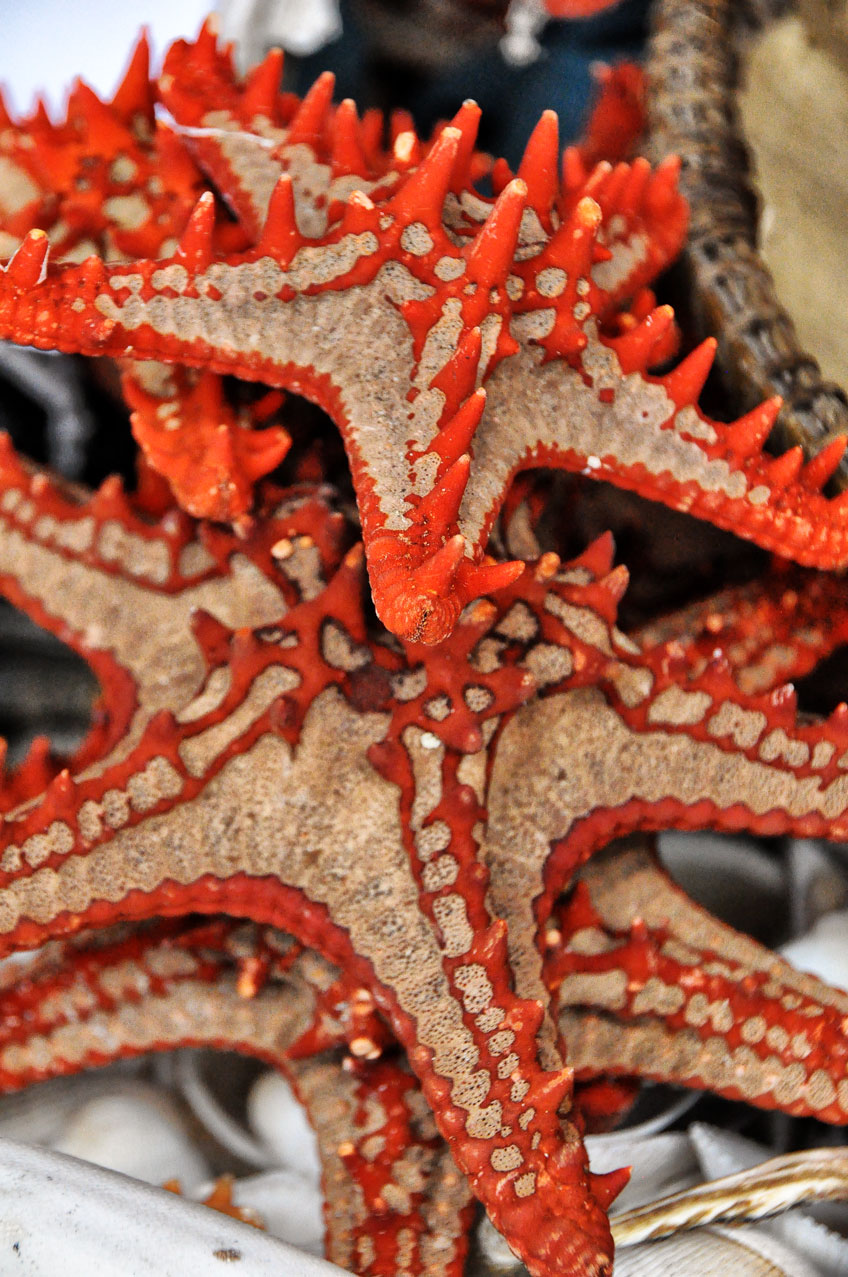
Mummified P. lincki for sale in Tanzania. Their sale contributes to the rarefaction of this species.

P. lincki grows to a maximum diameter of 12 in (30 cm). It has numerous tubercles located along its five arms. These tubercles are bright red and extend upward from the arms. It has a gray body with red stripes that connect the tubercles. This creates an appearance of a grid made of interconnecting wires.

The skeleton is composed of many calcareous ossicles and spicules. They are located inside the layer of connective tissue. This skeleton supports the large central disk.

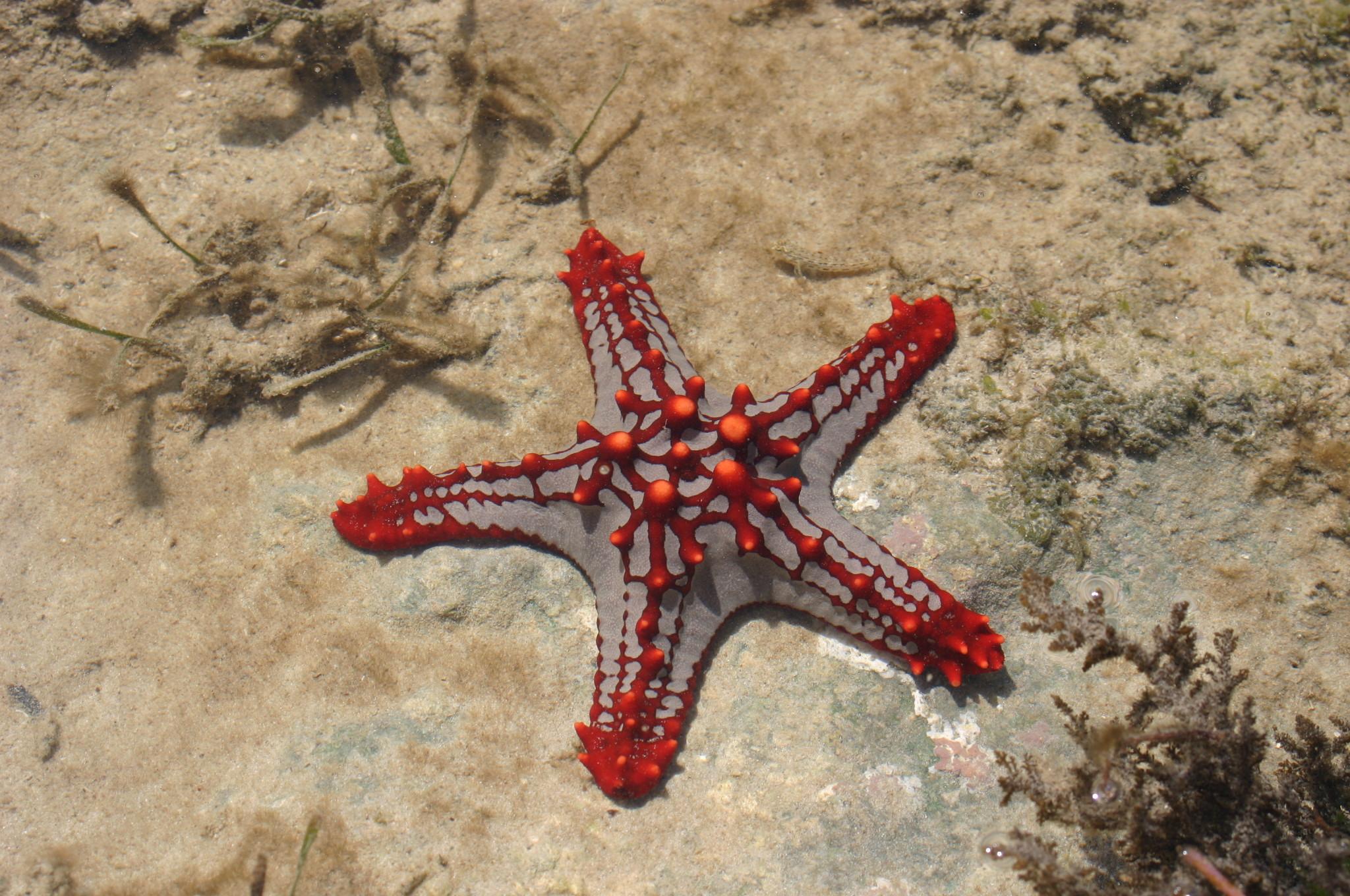
Off the coast of Kenya.

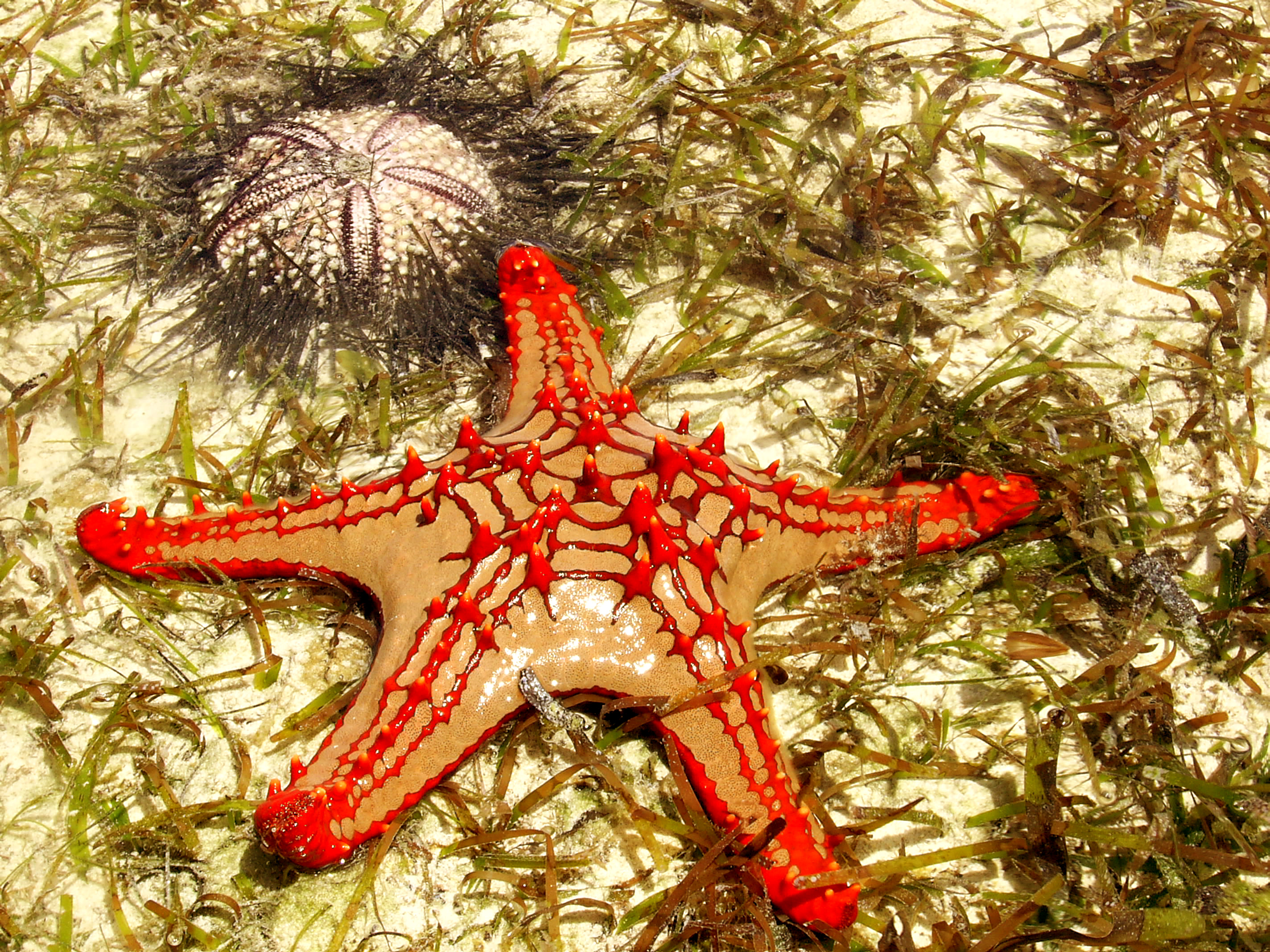
Close to a dead Astropyga radiata

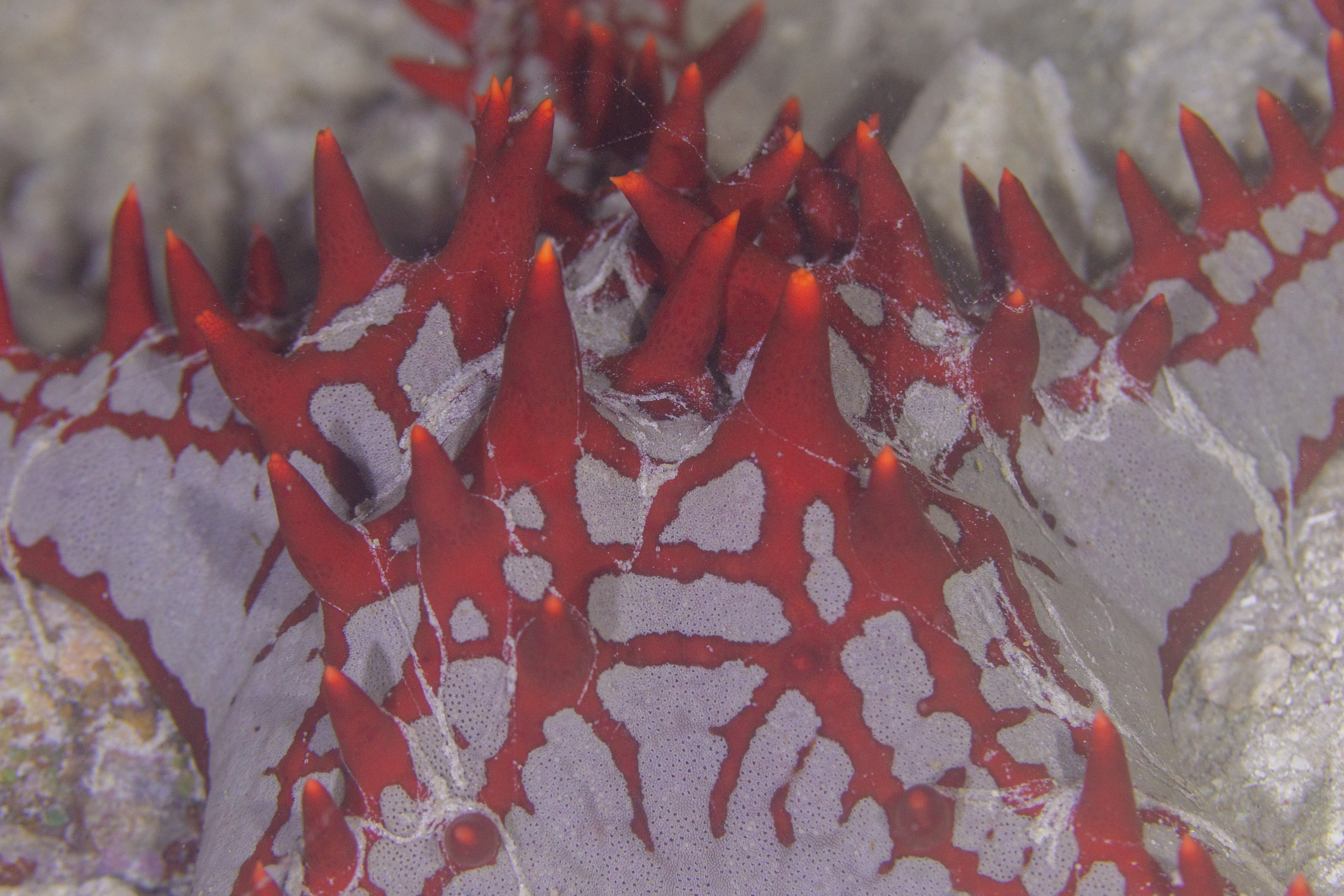
Detailview

== Distribution ==
It is distributed in the western Indian Ocean.

The red-knobbed starfish can only be found in the Indian Ocean, mostly along the African coast and Madagascar, north to India and Sri Lanka. A small population is also present in Coral Bay, Western Australia.

They prefer sandy or muddy seabeds because it is easier for them to search and forage for food. While they are most often seen in shallow tidal pools, they can live in a variety of depths, down to 100 m (330 ft) deep. Red-knobbed starfish are carnivorous animals that eat a number of sea creatures.

== Behaviour and diet ==
P. lincki is active in both daytime and nighttime. It is a popular aquarium specimen, but is considered incompatible with many other invertebrates, as it will eat soft corals, sponges, tube worms, clams, other starfish, and the like.

It is also a heavily fished species for the curios trade, which contributes to the decline of the species.

== Bibliography ==
- Ducarme, Frédéric (2022). "How to assess the absence of a species? A revision of the geographical range of the horned sea star, Protoreaster nodosus (Echinodermata; Asteroidea)". Frontiers of Biogeography. 14 (3). doi:10.21425/F5FBG56187.
