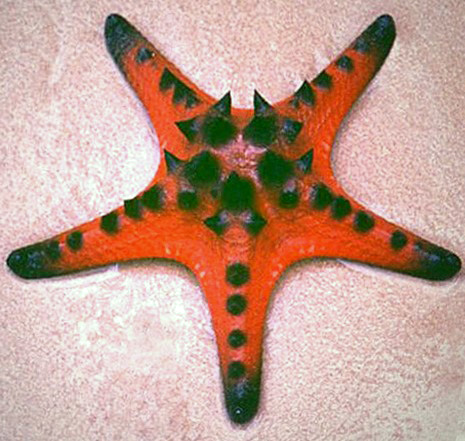

Scientific classification
- Kingdom: Animalia
- Phylum: Echinodermata
- Class: Asteroidea
- Order: Valvatida
- Family: Oreasteridae
- Genus: Protoreaster
- Species: P. nodosus

Binomial name
- Protoreaster nodosus (Linnaeus, 1758)

= Protoreaster nodosus =

Horned sea star

Species of starfish

Protoreaster nodosus, commonly known as the horned starfish or chocolate chip starfish, is a species of sea star found in the warm, shallow waters of the Indo-Pacific region. They are sometimes seen in the marine aquarium trade or dried and sold as curios.

== Description ==
Close-up of spines

P. nodosus possess rows of spines or "horns"; black conical points arranged in a single row, radially on the dorsal side, which may erode and become blunt. These dark protrusions can intimidate possible predators by looking frightening or dangerous. On the ventral side, tube feet, purple in color (or pale, transparent pink), are arranged in rows on each arm.

Most horned sea stars found are a roughly rigid five-pointed star-shape with tapering arms to the end, although there are anomalies like four or six-armed specimens; they may grow up to 30 cm (12 in) in diameter. The sea stars are usually colored in shades of red or brown, but can be light tan, resembling the color of cookie dough. This coloration, combined with the small horns on its dorsal side, give the sea star an appearance similar to a chocolate chip cookie.

== Habitat and behavior ==
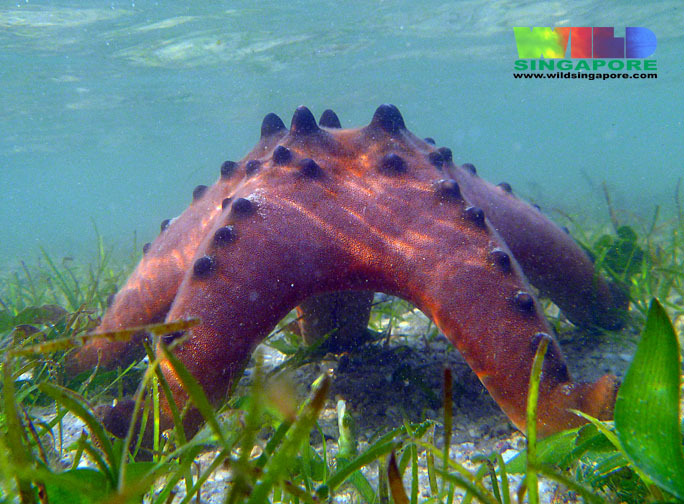
Underwater in spawning posture

Horned sea stars prefer sheltered, sandy or slightly muddy bottoms to hard substrata such as coral reefs, or areas of vegetation (like mangrove forests), and are frequently sighted conspicuously between the leaves of seagrasses on sea grass meadows or on blank stretches of coral sand. Field studies suggest the species could be restricted to the western Pacific Ocean (Thailand to Samoa and Japan to New Caledonia). In shallow water, this species can be seen intertidally, occasionally exposed to the low tide. They do not withstand rapid changes well, and usually keep themselves underwater. Many individuals of this species can be seen gathering on soft ocean bottoms. While the cause is mostly unknown, it is thought to likely increase the chance of fertilization when spawning, or is simply a suitable feeding ground.

Horned sea stars are opportunistic carnivores; adults are known to prey on most sessile life forms including hard corals and sponges in an aquarium. In this same environment, they will hunt down snails for food. An individual horned sea star has been observed eating a sea urchin in their natural habitat.

As with other tropical echinoderms, commensal animals like shrimps (of genus Periclimenes), tiny brittle stars and even juvenile filefish can be found on the surface of a horned sea star. This may be attributed to its protective nature, as the horned sea star has few predators.

== Overharvesting ==
In many tropical Asian and Pacific countries, where horned sea stars are collected for sea shell trade, overharvesting has a severe impact on the population of the echinoderms. A related species, the Atlantic Oreaster reticulatus, commonly known as Bahama sea star, is similarly a once-abundant species reduced in number due to continuous harvesting by both industry and tourists alike.

== Gallery ==
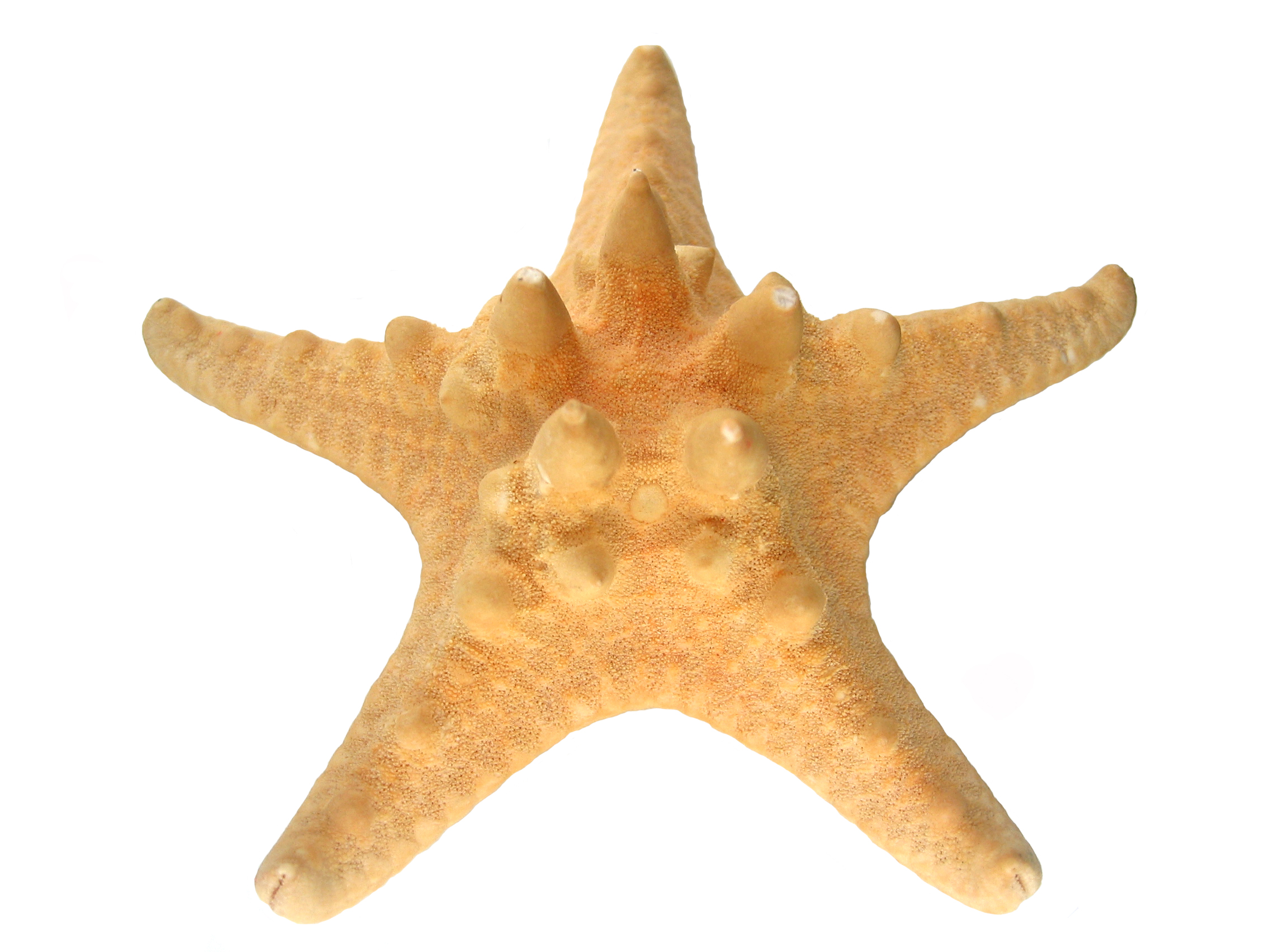
Dried specimen

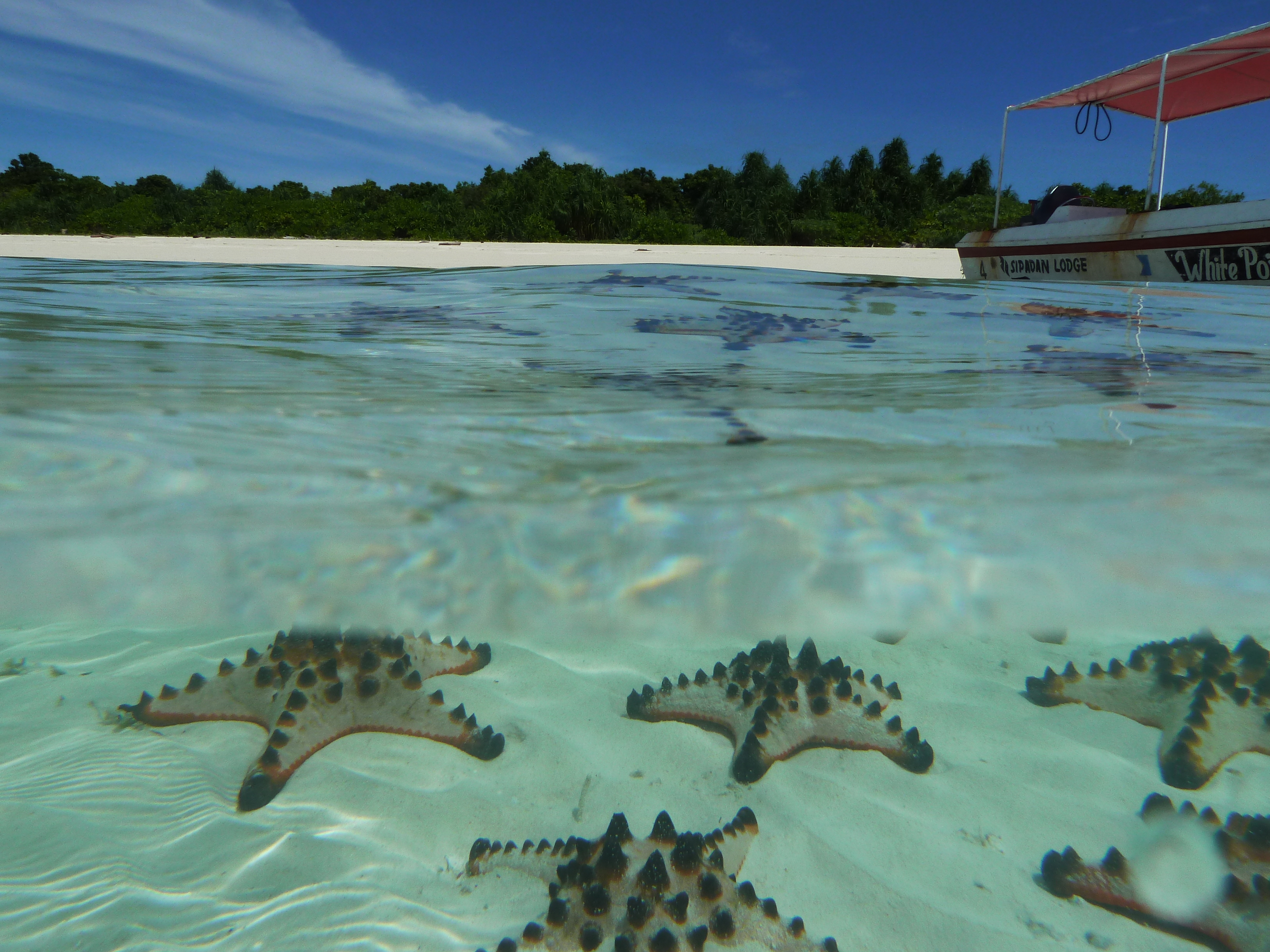
A group of knobby sea stars in Malaysia

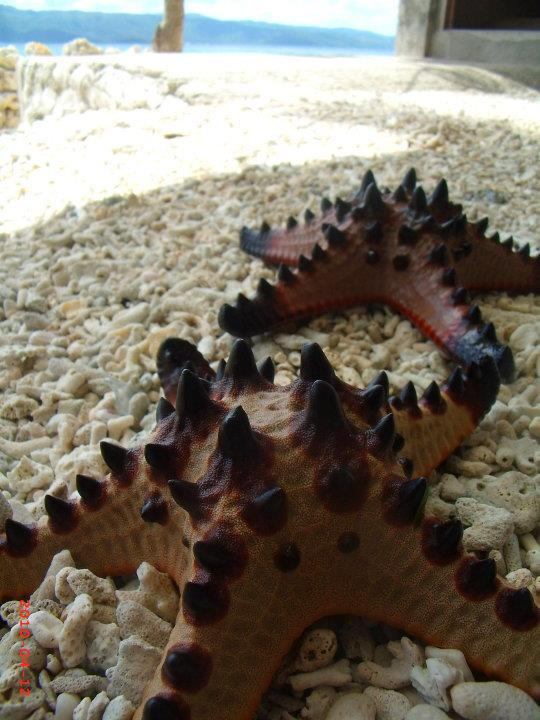
Dried sea stars for touristic trade in Philippines

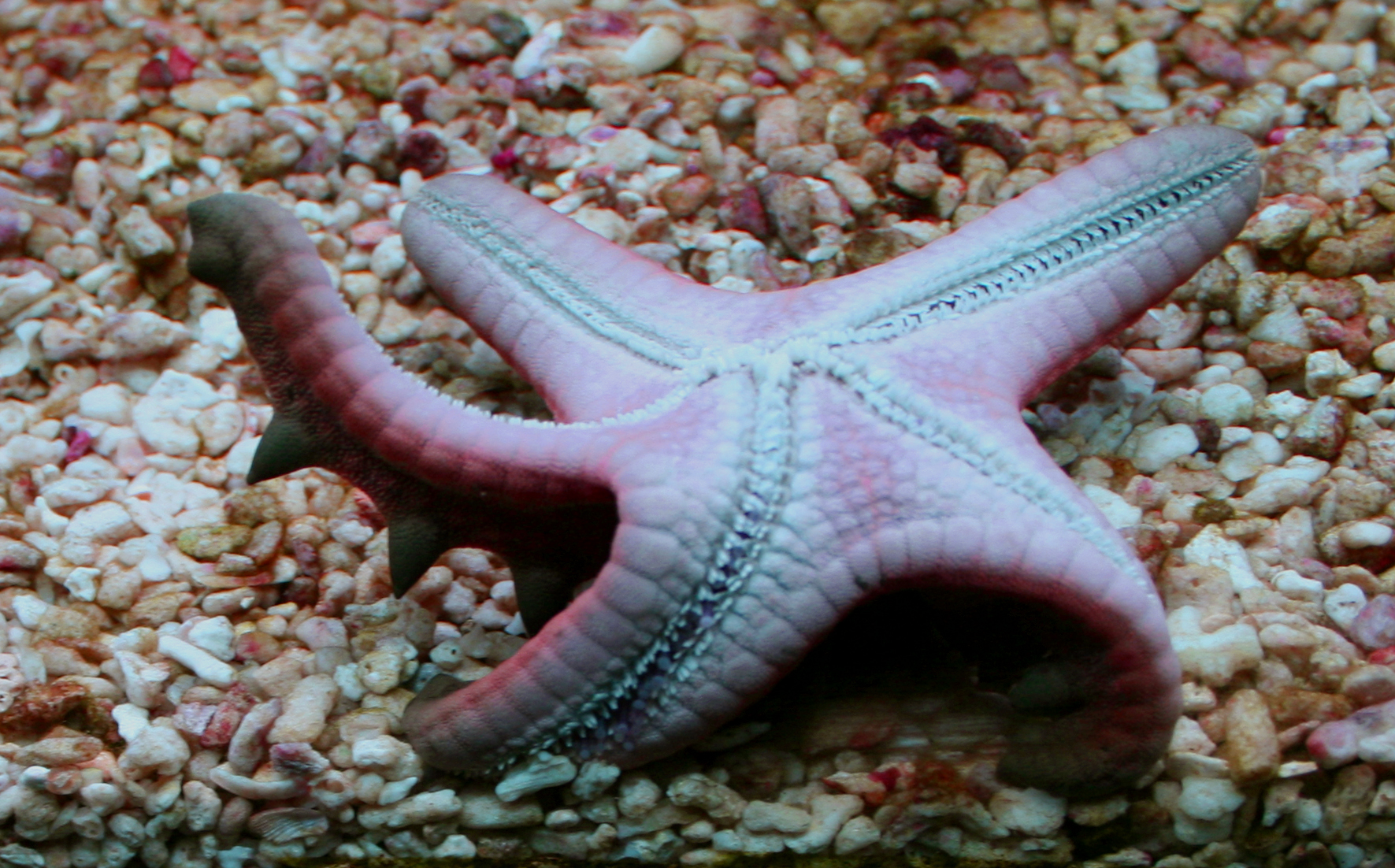
Oral face

On beach

== Bibliography ==
- Ducarme, Frédéric (2022). "How to assess the absence of a species? A revision of the geographical range of the horned sea star, Protoreaster nodosus (Echinodermata; Asteroidea)". Frontiers of Biogeography. 14 (3). doi:10.21425/F5FBG56187.
