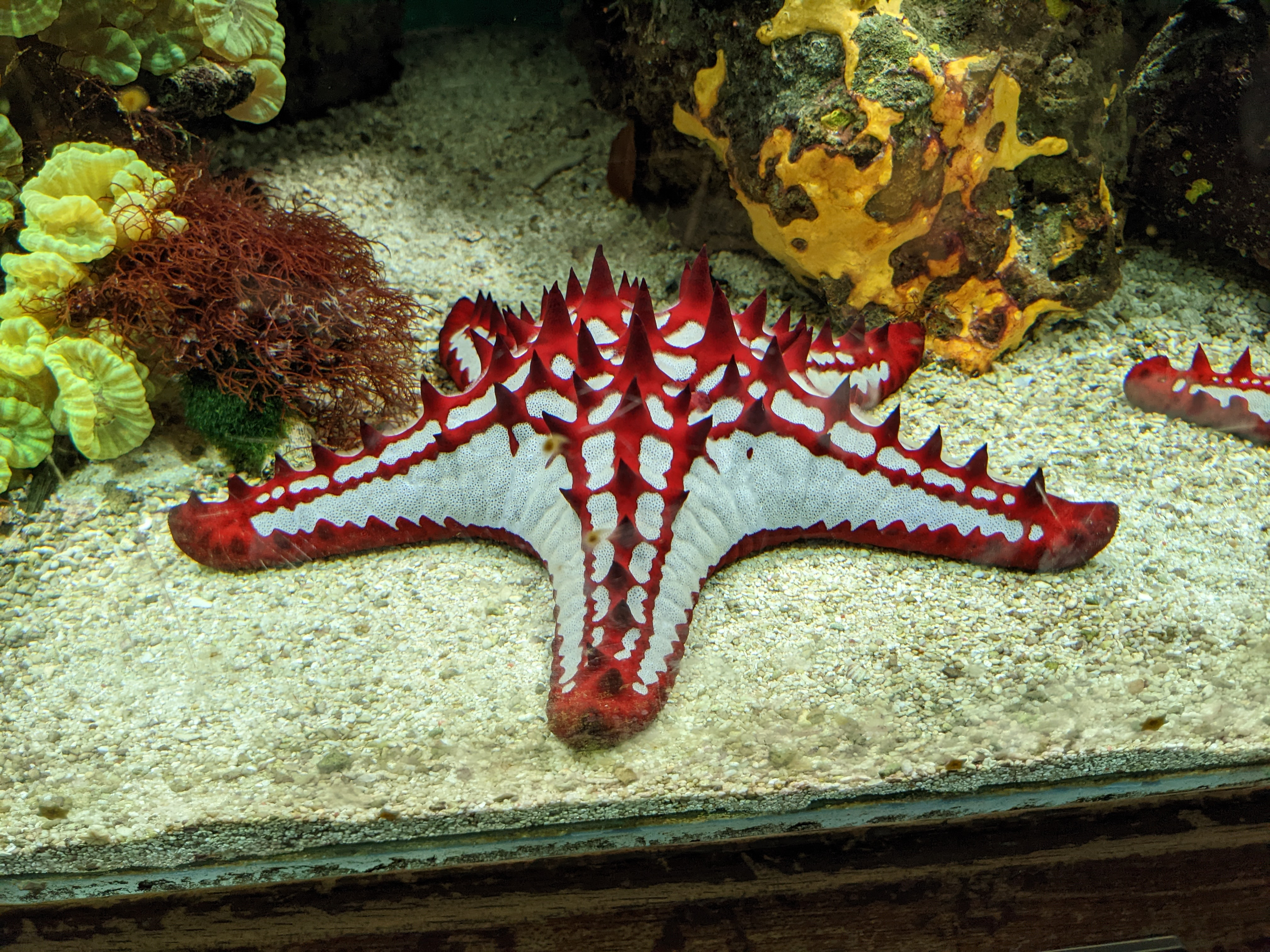
- Protoreaster linckii

Scientific classification
- Domain: Eukaryota
- Kingdom: Animalia
- Phylum: Echinodermata
- Class: Asteroidea
- Order: Valvatida
- Family: Oreasteridae
- Genus: Protoreaster; Döderlein, 1916

Species
- See text.

= Protoreaster =

Genus of starfishes

Protoreaster is a genus of sea stars in the family Oreasteridae from the Indo-Pacific. They are sometimes seen in the marine aquarium trade.

== Species ==
The following species are in the genus:

Image	Scientific name	Common name	Distribution
	Protoreaster linckii (Blainville, 1830)	Red-knobbed starfish	Indian Ocean
	Protoreaster nodosus (Linnaeus, 1758)	Chocolate chip sea star	Indian Ocean and western Pacific ocean
	Protoreaster nodulosus (Perrier, 1875)	Knobbly seastar	North Western Australia

== Bibliography ==
- Ducarme, Frédéric (2022). "How to assess the absence of a species? A revision of the geographical range of the horned sea star, Protoreaster nodosus (Echinodermata; Asteroidea)". Frontiers of Biogeography. 14 (3). doi:10.21425/F5FBG56187.
