= List of echinoderms of South Africa =

List of species that form a part of the echinoderm fauna of South Africa

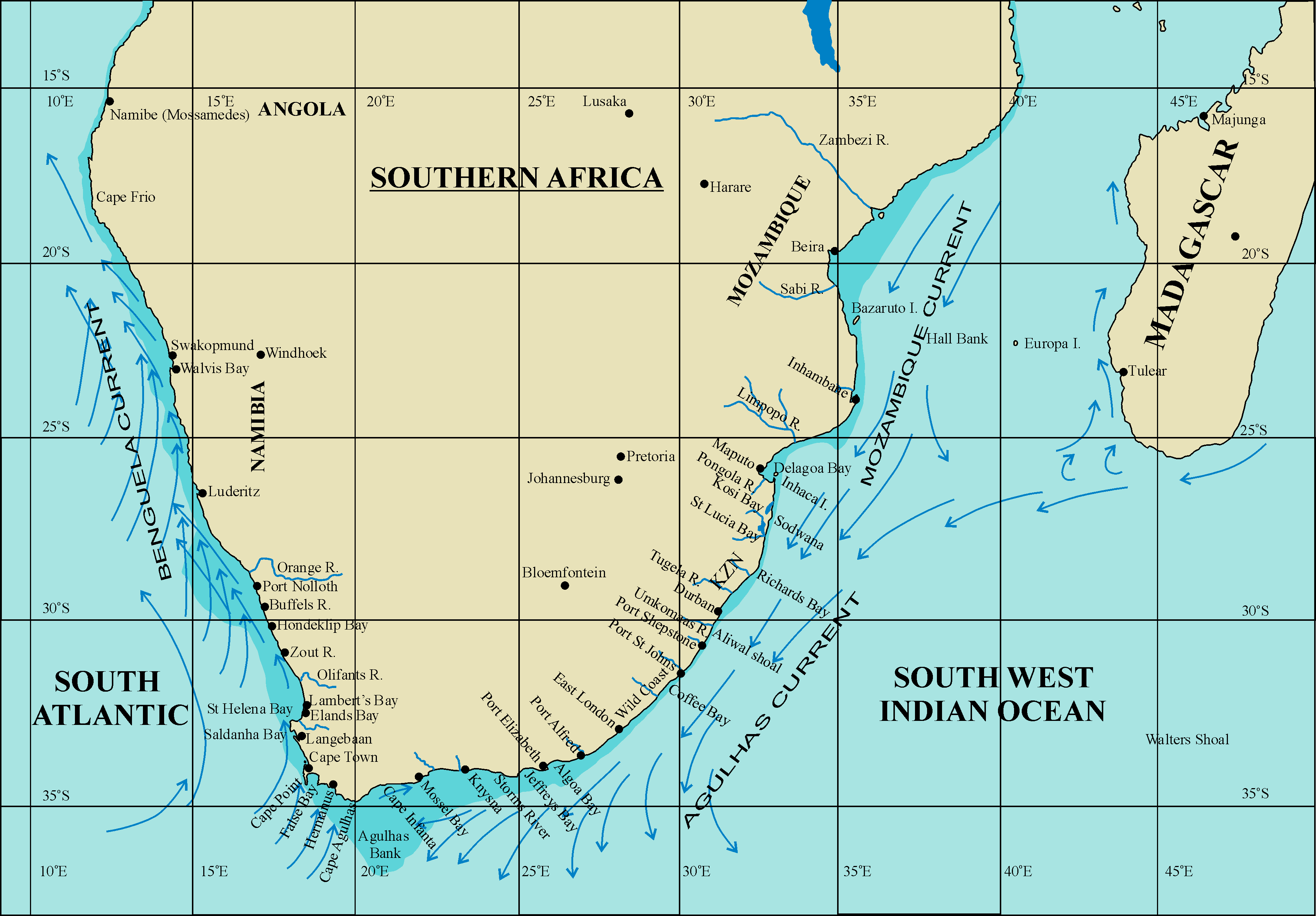
Map of the Southern African coastline showing some of the landmarks referred to in species range statements

The list of echinoderms of South Africa is a list of species that form a part of the echinoderm (Phylum Echinodermata) fauna of South Africa, and includes the starfish, feather stars, brittle stars, sea urchins and sea cucumbers. The list follows the SANBI listing on iNaturalist.

An echinoderm (/ɪˈkaɪnəˌdɜːrm, ˈɛkə-/) is any animal of the phylum Echinodermata (/ɪˌkaɪnoʊˈdɜːrmətə/), which includes starfish, brittle stars, sea urchins, sand dollars and sea cucumbers, as well as the sessile sea lilies or "stone lilies". While bilaterally symmetrical as larvae, as adults echinoderms are recognisable by their usually five-pointed radial symmetry (pentamerous symmetry), and are found on the sea bed at every ocean depth from the intertidal zone to the abyssal zone. The phylum contains about 7,600 living species, making it the second-largest group of deuterostomes after the chordates, as well as the largest marine-only phylum. The first definitive echinoderms appeared near the start of the Cambrian.

Echinoderms are important both ecologically and geologically. Ecologically, there are few other groupings so abundant in the deep sea, as well as shallower oceans. Most echinoderms are able to reproduce asexually and regenerate tissue, organs and limbs; in some cases, they can undergo complete regeneration from a single limb. Geologically, the value of echinoderms is in their ossified dermal endoskeletons, which are major contributors to many limestone formations and can provide valuable clues as to the geological environment. They were the most used species in regenerative research in the 19th and 20th centuries. Further, some scientists hold that the radiation of echinoderms was responsible for the Mesozoic Marine Revolution. (Full article...)

== Subphylum Asterozoa ==
=== Class Asteroidea ===
==== Superorder Forcipulatacea, order Forcipulatida ====
===== Family Asteriidae =====
- Coscinasterias calamaria (Gray, 1840) Many armed sea star
- Marthasterias glacialis (Linnaeus, 1758) Spiny starfish

==== Superorder Spinulosacea, order Spinulosida ====
===== Family Echinasteridae =====
- Henricia ornata (Perrier, 1869) Reticulated starfish

==== Superorder Valvatacea, order Paxillosida ====
===== Family Astropectinidae =====
- Astropecten granulatus Müller & Troschel, 1842 Grey sandstar
- Astropecten hemprichi Müller & Troschel, 1842
- Astropecten irregularis pontoporeus Sladen, 1883 Pink sandstar

==== Order Valvatida, ====
===== Family Acanthasteridae =====
- Acanthaster planci (Linnaeus, 1758) Crown of thorns starfish

===== Family Asterinidae =====
- Aquilonastra burtoni (Gray, 1840)
- Asterina stellifera (Möbius, 1859) Namibian cushion star
- Callopatiria granifera (Gray, 1847) Red starfish
- Parvulastra exigua (Lamarck, 1816) Dwarf cushion star
- Patiriella dyscrita (H.L. Clark, 1923) Granular cushion star

===== Family Goniasteridae =====
- Calliaster baccatus Sladen, 1889 Cobbled sea star, tiled sea star
- Fromia elegans H.L. Clark, 1921 Blocked starfish
- Fromia indica (Perrier, 1869)

===== Family Mithrodiidae =====
- Thromidia catalai Pope & Rowe, 1977 Fat armed star

===== Family Ophidiasteridae =====
- Austrofromia schultzei (Döderlein, 1910) Granular starfish
- Linckia guildingi Gray, 1840
- Linckia laevigata (Linnaeus, 1758) Blue star
- Linckia multifora (Lamarck, 1816)
- Narcissia spp.
- Nardoa variolata (Retzius, 1805) Button star

===== Family Oreasteridae =====
- Choriaster granulatus Lütken, 1869 Granulated star
- Culcita schmideliana (Retzius, 1805) Pincushion starfish
- Halityle regularis Fisher, 1913 Regular star
- Protoreaster lincki (Blainville, 1830) Spine tipped star
- Pentaceraster mammillatus (Audouin, 1826) Beaded starfish

===== Family Pterasteridae =====
- Euretaster cribrosus (von Martens, 1867)
- Pteraster capensis Gray, 1847 Brooding cushion star

=== Class Ophiuroidea ===
==== Order Euryalida ====
===== Family Gorgonocephalidae =====
- Astroboa nuda (Lyman, 1874) Naked basket star
- Astrocladus euryale (Retzius, 1783) Basket star

==== Superfamily Euryalidea ====
===== Family Asteroschematidae =====
- Asteroschema capensis Mortensen, 1925

===== Family Euryalidae, Subfamily Euryalinae =====
- Euryale spp.

==== Order Ophiurida, Suborder Ophiurina, Infraorder Gnathophiurina ====
===== Family Amphiuridae =====
- Amphiura (Amphiura) capensis Ljungman, 1867 Equal tailed brittlestar
- Amphioplus (Lymanella) integer (Ljungman, 1867)
- Amphipholis squamata (Delle Chiaje, 1828)
- Ophiodaphne scripta (Koehler, 1904) Pansy-shell brittlestar

===== Family Ophiactidae =====
- Ophiactis carnea Ljungman, 1867 Snake-star
- Ophiactis savignyi (Müller & Troschel, 1842)

===== Family Ophiocomidae, Subfamily Ophiocominae =====
- Ophiocoma (Breviturma) brevipes Peters, 1851
- Ophiocoma (Breviturma) dentata Müller & Troschel, 1842
- Ophiocoma (Breviturma) doederleini de Loriol, 1899
- Ophiocoma erinaceus Müller & Troschel, 1842
- Ophiocoma pica Müller & Troschel, 1842
- Ophiocoma pusilla (Brock, 1888)
- Ophiocoma scolopendrina (Lamarck, 1816)
- Ophiocoma valenciae Müller & Troschel, 1842 Snake armed brittlestar

===== Family Ophionereididae =====
- Ophionereis dubia dubia (Müller & Troschel, 1842) Striped brittlestar
- Ophionereis porrecta Lyman, 1860 Striped brittlestar

===== Family Ophiotrichidae =====
- Macrophiothrix hirsuta cheneyi (Lyman, 1862)
- Ophiocnemis marmorata (Lamarck, 1816) Hitchhiker brittlestar
- Ophiothela danae Verrill, 1869 Commensal brittlestar
- Ophiothrix (Acanthophiothrix) purpurea von Martens, 1867
- Ophiothrix (Ophiothrix) foveolata Marktanner-Turneretscher, 1887
- Ophiothrix fragilis (Abildgaard, in O.F. Müller, 1789) Hairy brittlestar
- Ophiothrix fragilis var. triglochis Müller & Troschel, 1842

==== Infraorder Ophiodermatina ====
===== Family Ophiodermatidae =====
====== Subfamily Ophiarachninae ======
- Ophiarachnella capensis (Bell, 1888) Banded brittlestar

====== Subfamily Ophiodermatinae ======
- Ophioderma wahlbergii Müller & Troschel, 1842 Serpent skinned brittlestar

== Subphylum Crinozoa ==
=== Class Crinoidea, subclass Articulata ===
==== Order Comatulida, sub-order Comatulidina ====
===== Super-family Antedonoidea, family Antedonidae, subfamily Antedoninae =====
- Annametra occidentalis (AH Clark, 1915)

===== Superfamily Comasteroidea, family Comatulidae, subfamily Comatulinae =====
- Comanthus wahlbergii (Müller, 1843) Common feather star

===== Superfamily Mariametroidea, family Mariametridae =====
- Stephanometra indica (Smith, 1876) Indicated feather star

===== Superfamily Tropiometroidea, family Tropiometridae =====
- Tropiometra carinata (Lamarck, 1816) Elegant feather star

== Subphylum Echinozoa ==
=== Class Echinoidea, subclass Cidaroidea ===
==== Order Cidaroida ====
===== Superfamily Cidaridea, family Cidaridae, subfamily Cidarinae =====
- Eucidaris metularia (Lamarck, 1816)
- Phyllacanthus imperialis (Lamarck, 1816)

===== Subfamily Stylocidarinae =====
- Prionocidaris pistillaris (Lamarck, 1816) Rough pencil urchin

=== Subclass Euechinoidea, infraclass Acroechinoidea ===
==== Order Diadematoida ====
===== Family Diadematidae =====
- Astropyga radiata (Leske, 1778)
- Diadema savignyi (Audouin, 1829) Needle urchin
- Diadema setosum (Leske, 1778) Needle urchin
- Echinothrix calamaris (Pallas, 1774) Banded urchin

=== Infraclass Carinacea ===
==== Superorder Echinacea, order Arbacioida ====
===== Family Arbaciidae =====
- Tetrapygus niger (Molina, 1782) Black urchin

==== Order Camarodonta, infraorder Echinidea ====
===== Family Echinidae =====
- Echinus gilchristi Bell, 1904 Deep water urchin

===== Family Parechinidae =====
- Parechinus angulosus (Leske, 1778) Cape urchin

===== Superfamily Odontophora, family Echinometridae =====
- Colobocentrotus (Podophora) atratus (Linnaeus, 1758)
- Echinometra mathaei (Blainville, 1825) Oval urchin
- Echinostrephus molaris (Blainville, 1825) Tuft urchin
- Heterocentrotus mamillatus (Linnaeus, 1758) Slate pencil urchin

===== Family Toxopneustidae =====
- Toxopneustes pileolus (Lamarck, 1816) Flower urchin
- Tripneustes gratilla (Linnaeus, 1758) Short-spined urchin

==== Infraorder Temnopleuridea ====
===== Family Temnopleuridae =====
- Salmacis bicolor L. Agassiz in L. Agassiz & Desor, 1846 Bicoloured urchin

==== Order Stomopneustoida ====
===== Family Stomopneustidae =====
- Stomopneustes variolaris (Lamarck, 1816) Pot-hole urchin

=== Infraclass Irregularia ===
==== Superorder Atelostomata, order Spatangoida, suborder Brissidina ====
===== Superfamily Spatangidea, family Loveniidae, subfamily Echinocardiinae =====
- Echinocardium cordatum (Pennant, 1777) Heart urchin
- Lovenia elongata (Gray, 1845)

===== Family Maretiidae =====
- Spatagobrissus mirabilis H.L. Clark, 1923 Heart urchin

==== Superorder Neognathostomata, order Clypeasteroida, suborder Scutellina, infraorder Scutelliformes ====
===== Superfamily Scutellidea, family Astriclypeidae =====
- Echinodiscus auritus Leske, 1778 Pansy shell
- Echinodiscus bisperforatus Leske, 1778 Pansy shell

==== Infraorder Laganiformes ====
===== Family Echinocyamidae =====
- Echinocyamus sp.

==== Order Echinolampadoida ====
===== Family Echinolampadidae =====
- Echinolampas crassa (Bell, 1880) Lamp urchin

=== Class Holothuroidea ===
==== Order Apodida ====
===== Family Chiridotidae =====
- Taeniogyrus dayi Cherbonnier, 1952

===== Family Synaptidae =====
- Leptosynapta knysnaensis (Cherbonnier, 1952)
- Synapta maculata (Chamisso & Eysenhardt, 1821) Snake sea cucumber

==== Order Aspidochirotida ====
===== Family Holothuriidae =====
- Bohadschia subrubra (Quoy & Gaimard, 1834)
- Holothuria (Halodeima) atra Jaeger, 1833
- Holothuria (Mertensiothuria) leucospilota (Brandt, 1835) Tapering sea cucumber
- Holothuria (Metriatyla) scabra Jaeger, 1833
- Holothuria (Microthele) nobilis (Selenka, 1867) Noble sea cucumber
- Holothuria (Selenkothuria) parva Krauss in Lampert, 1885 Banana sea cucumber
- Holothuria (Semperothuria) cinerascens (Brandt, 1835) Tufted sea cucumber

===== Family Stichopodidae =====
- Neostichopus grammatus (H.L. Clark, 1923) Warty sea cucumber
- Stichopus chloronotus Brandt, 1835
- Thelenota ananas (Jaeger, 1833) Pineapple sea cucumber

==== Order Dendrochirotida ====
===== Family Cucumariidae =====
- Aslia spyridophora (H.L. Clark, 1923) Grey sea cucumber syn. Cucumaria spyridophora, Pentacucumis spyridophora
- Pentacta doliolum (Pallas, 1766) Cask sea cucumber, mauve sea cucumber
- Pseudocnella insolens (Théel, 1886) Red-chested sea cucumber syn. Cucumaria insolens Théel, 1886
- Pseudocnella sykion (Lampert, 1885) Black sea cucumber syn. Cucumaria sykion (Lampert, 1885)
- Roweia stephensoni (John, 1939) Stephenson's sea cucumber syn. Cucumaria stephensoni John, 1939
- Roweia frauenfeldi frauenfeldi (Ludwig, 1882) Horseshoe sea cucumber syn. Cucumaria frauenfeldi Ludwig, 1882
- Trachasina crucifera (Semper, 1869) syn. Trachythyone crucifera (Semper, 1869)

===== Family Psolidae =====
- Psolus griffithsi Thandar, 2009

===== Family Phyllophoridae =====
- Stolus buccalis (Stimpson, 1855) syn. Thyone sacellus (Selenka)
- Thyone aurea (Quoy & Gaimard, 1834) Golden sea cucumber
