= Red starfish =

Red starfish (or red sea star) is a common name for several starfish and may refer to:

- Callopatiria granifera, native to southern African coasts
- Echinaster sepositus, native to the Mediterranean and eastern Atlantic
- Fromia indica, native to the Indian Ocean and western Pacific and common in the aquarium trade
- Fromia milleporella, native to the Indian Ocean and western Pacific and common in the aquarium trade
