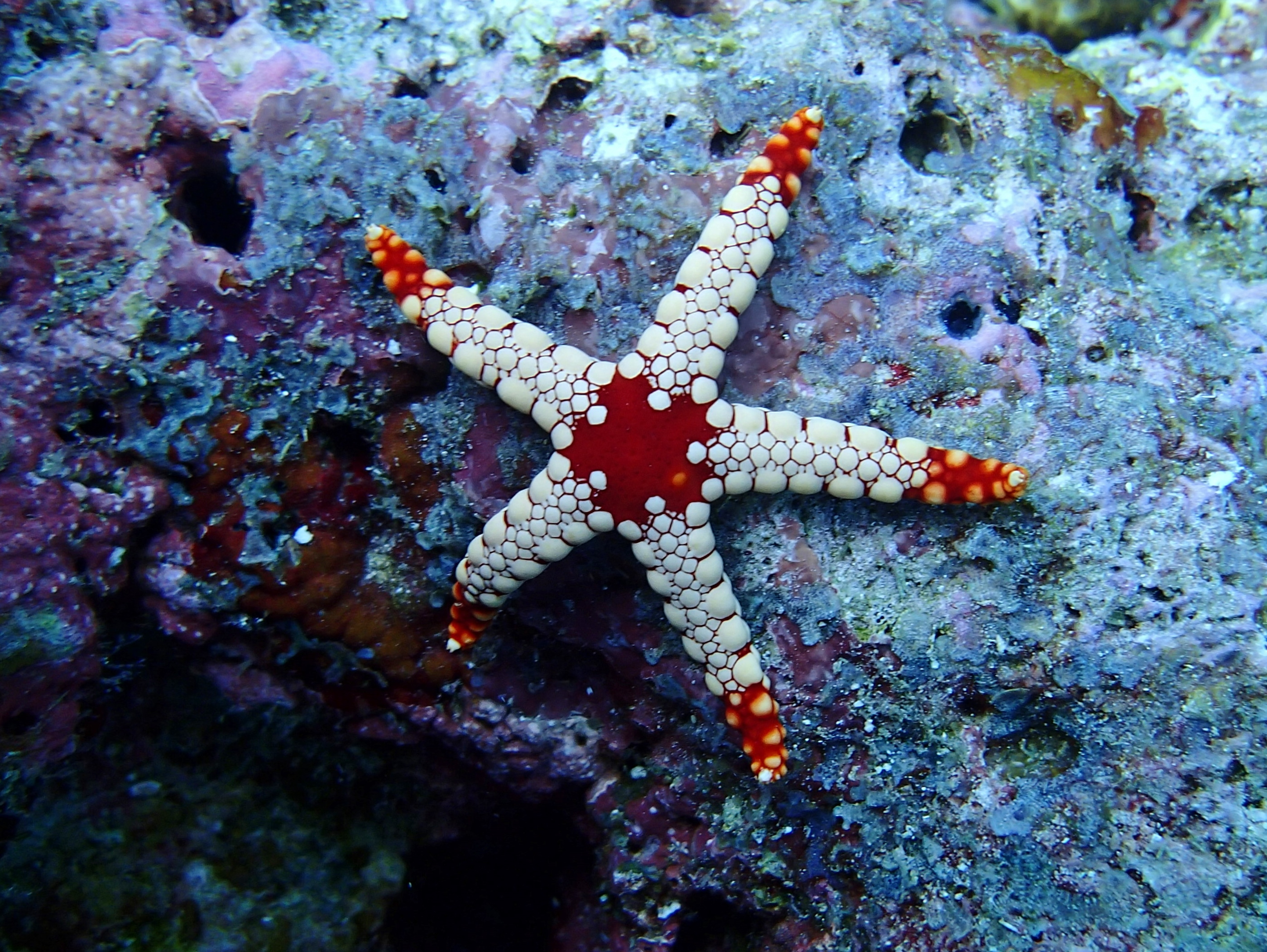

Scientific classification
- Kingdom: Animalia
- Phylum: Echinodermata
- Class: Asteroidea
- Order: Valvatida
- Family: Goniasteridae
- Genus: Fromia
- Species: F. nodosa

Binomial name
- Fromia nodosa A.M. Clark, 1967

= Fromia nodosa =

Species of starfish

Fromia nodosa, commonly called elegant sea star, is a species of marine starfish belonging to the family Goniasteridae.

== Description ==
The elegant sea star has five triangular arms radiating around an apparent central disc. its coloration is reddish, sometimes blueish to orange, and more or less densely covered with large, embossed creamy rounded plates, which are slightly angular at their top and whose size decreases towards the end of the arms. These plates leave a normally open pentagonal area on the central disc, but they also can sometimes completely cover it. Adult animals measure a maximum of 10 cm in diameter. This species is sometimes very difficult to differentiate from closely related species such as Fromia monilis or Fromia heffernani: F. monilis has no relief plates and F. heffernani has more rounded plates which line the outside of the arms and also the geographic distribution differs.

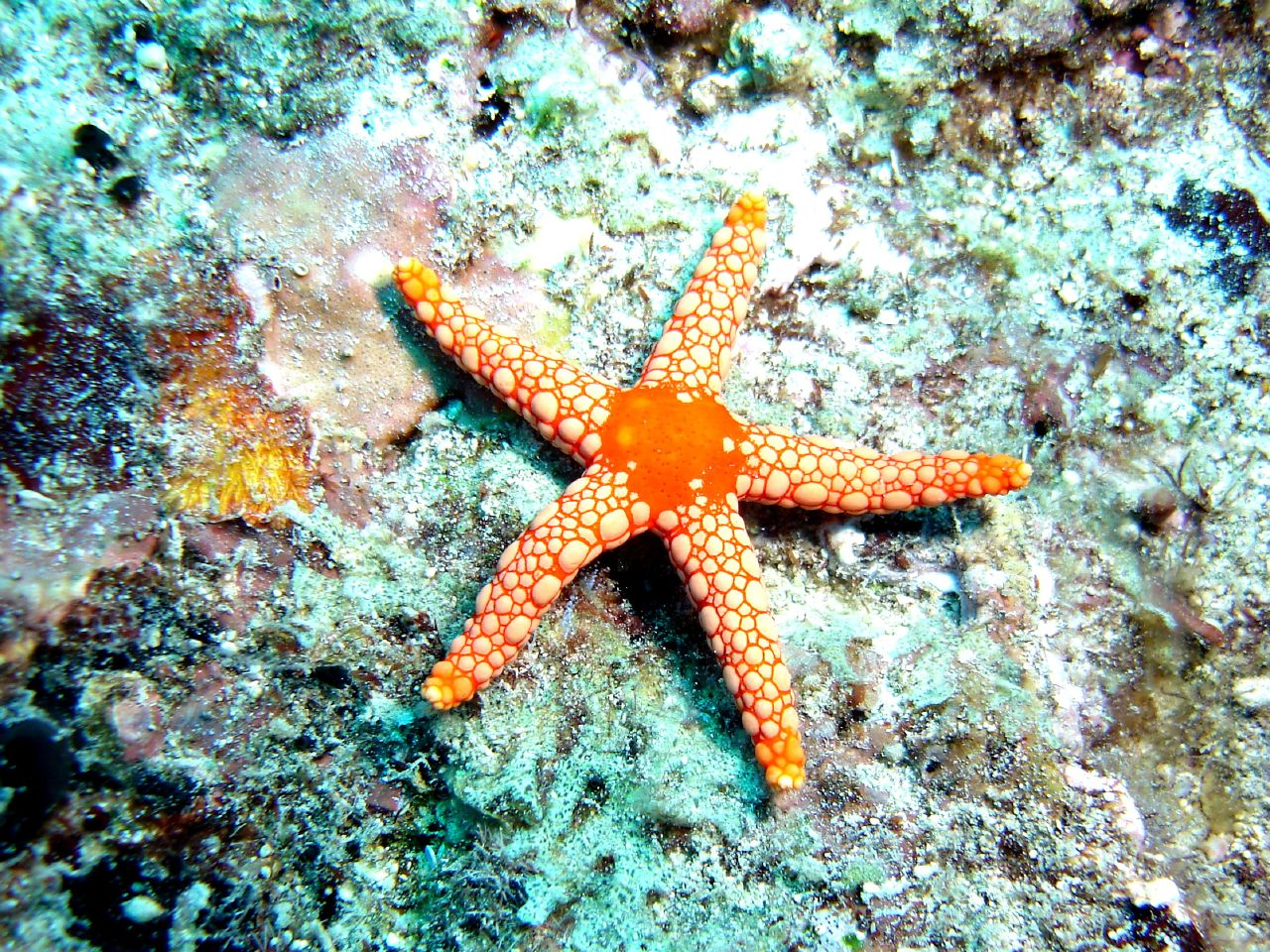
In Mauritius.

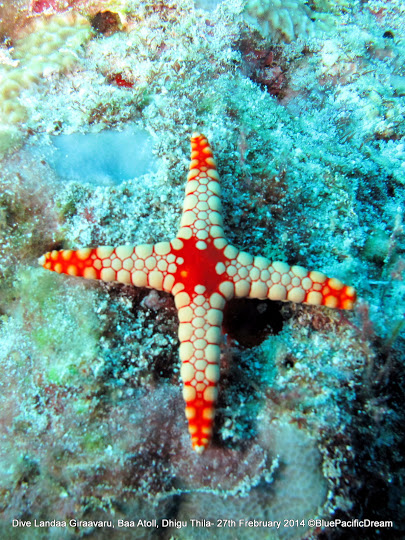
In Maldives.

== Distribution and habitat ==
The elegant sea star is present in the tropical waters of the Indian Ocean, from Seychelles to Maldives, where it is relatively common. It can be observed from surface to 35 m depth.

== Biology ==
This starfish has a nocturnal activity and feeds mainly on bivalve molluscs, corals, detritus and microalgae. To ingest its food, it needs as all other sea stars to externalize its stomach, this action is also called devagination, and has to make an external digestion.
