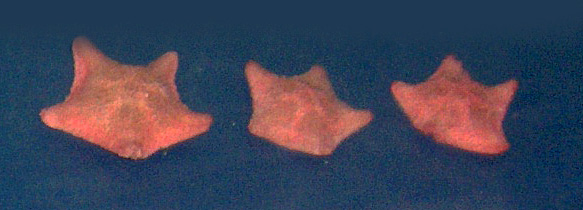
- Asterina gibbosa

Scientific classification
- Kingdom: Animalia
- Phylum: Echinodermata
- Class: Asteroidea
- Order: Valvatida
- Family: Asterinidae
- Genus: Asterina; Nardo, 1834

Type species
- Asterina gibbosa (Pennant, 1777)

= Asterina (echinoderm) =

Genus of echinoderms

Asterina is a genus of asteroideans in the family Asterinidae.

The species occurring in Australian waters are considered to not be congeneric with the type species A. gibbosa (Pennant, 1777) by Rowe and Gates (1995), and will possibly be assigned to another genus or a new genus. Rowe and Gates (1995) also suggested that Asterina should be restricted to Atlantic waters.

== Species ==
- Asterina fimbriata Perrier, 1875
- Asterina gibbosa (Pennant, 1777)
- Asterina gracilispina Clark, 1923
- Asterina hoensonae O'Loughlin, 2009
- Asterina krausii Gray, 1840
- Asterina lorioli Kœhler, 1910
- Asterina martinbarriosi López-Márquez, Acevedo, Manjón-Cabeza, García-Jiménez, Templado & Machordom, 2018
- Asterina pancerii (Gasco, 1876)
- Asterina phylactica Emson & Crump, 1979
- Asterina pusilla Perrier, 1875
- Asterina pygmaea Verrill, 1878
- Asterina squamata Perrier, 1875
- Asterina stellaris Perrier, 1875
- Asterina stellifera (Möbius, 1859)
  - Asterina stellifera obtusa Leipoldt, 1895
- Asterina vicentae López-Márquez, Acevedo, Manjón-Cabeza, García-Jiménez, Templado & Machordom, 2018
