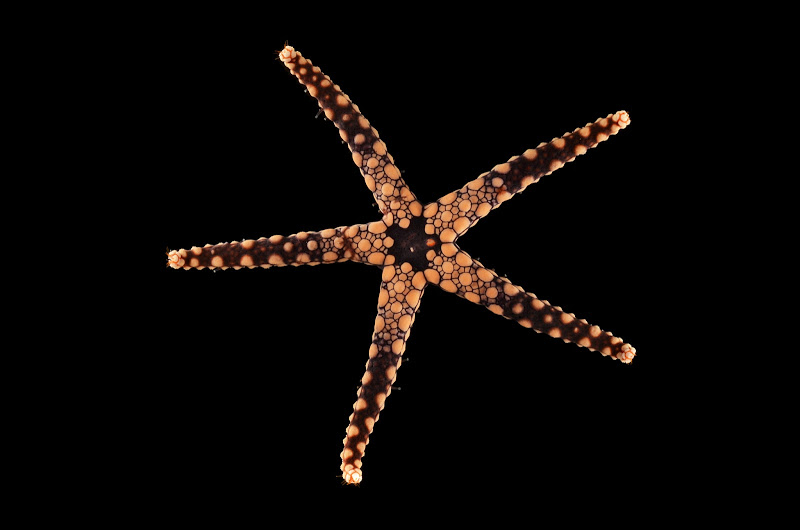
- Fromia heffernani from Papua New Guinea

Scientific classification
- Kingdom: Animalia
- Phylum: Echinodermata
- Class: Asteroidea
- Order: Valvatida
- Family: Goniasteridae
- Genus: Fromia
- Species: F. heffernani

Binomial name
- Fromia heffernani (Livingstone, 1931)

Synonyms
- Celerina heffernani (Livingstone, 1931); Ferdina heffernanii Livingstone, 1931

= Fromia heffernani =

Species of starfish

Fromia heffernani, known commonly as Hefferman's starfish, is a species of marine echinoderms in the family Ophidiasteridae.

Fromia heffernani is widespread throughout the tropical waters of the Indo-Pacific area.

This starfish can be distinguished from Fromia monilis by a unique range of short spikes lying on both side of the arms groove.
