= Fromia pacifica =

Scientific classification
- Kingdom: Animalia
- Phylum: Echinodermata
- Class: Asteroidea
- Order: Valvatida
- Family: Goniasteridae
- Genus: Fromia
- Species: F. pacifica

Binomial name
- Fromia pacifica H.L. Clark, 1921

Species of starfish

Fromia pacifica is a species of starfish in the genus Fromia. It is in the family Goniasteridae. This species is uncommon, It’s most often found at night on lagoon pinnacles.
