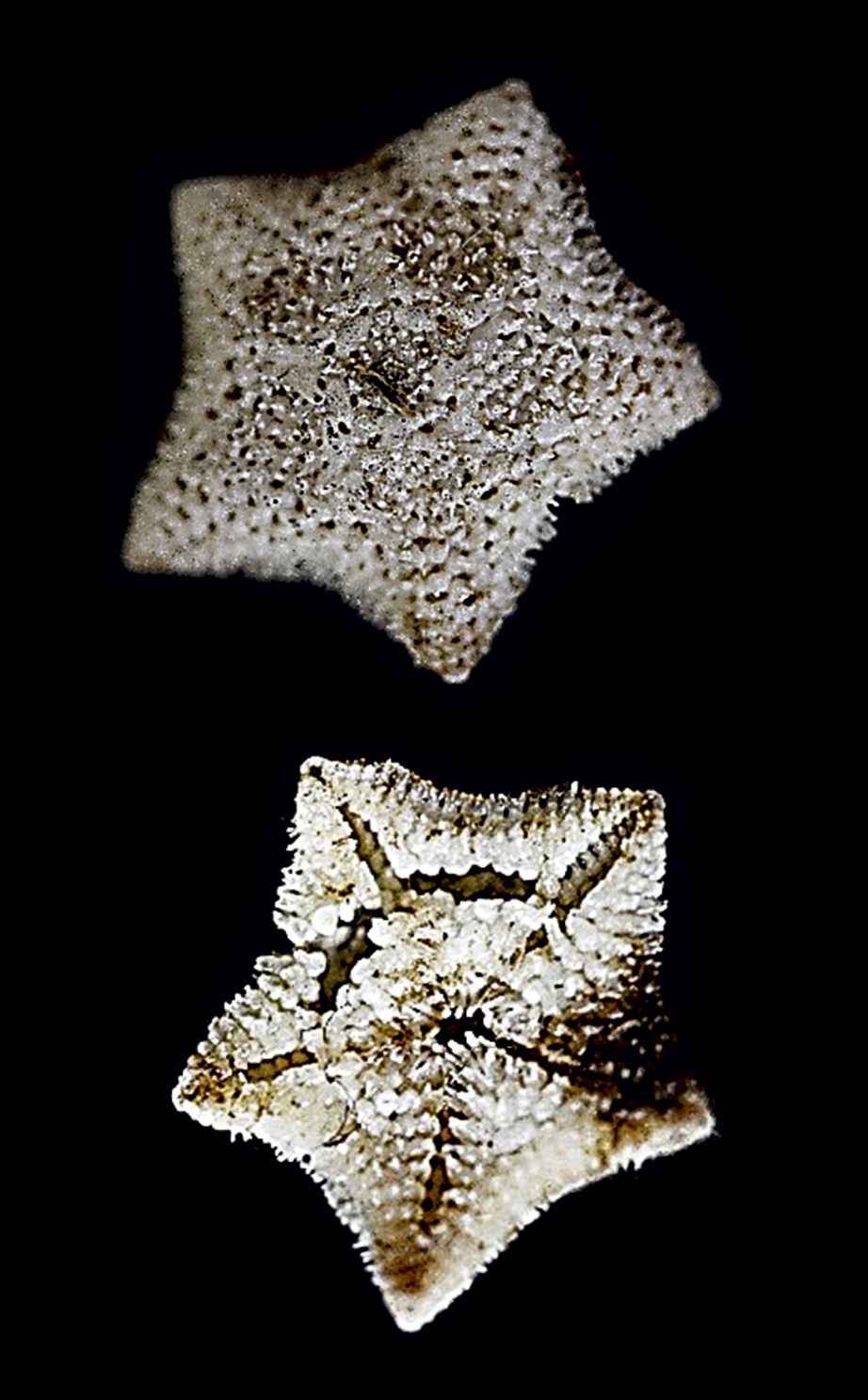

Scientific classification
- Kingdom: Animalia
- Phylum: Echinodermata
- Class: Asteroidea
- Order: Valvatida
- Family: Asterinidae
- Genus: Asterina
- Species: A. pancerii

Binomial name
- Asterina pancerii (Gasco, 1876)

Synonyms
- Asteriscus pancerii Gasco, 1876

= Asterina pancerii =

Species of starfish

Asterina pancerii, commonly known as the seagrass asterina, is a species of starfish in the family Asterinidae. It is native to shallow parts of the Mediterranean Sea where it is usually found in seagrass meadows.

== Description ==
Asterina pancerii is a very small starfish, seldom exceeding 1 cm (0.4 in) in diameter. It is pentagonal with five short, broad arms scarcely differentiated from the disc. The somewhat inflated aboral (upper) surface is covered by a mosaic of tiled plates each bearing a small tuft of three to eight regularly spaced crystalline spines. The marginal plates are fine, some bearing pedicellariae, and the tips of the arms have long, slender sensory tube feet and inconspicuous eyespots. The aboral surface is a radially symmetric star-shape of red, pink, purple and white plates; the oral (under) surface is a plain colour matching the main colour of the aboral surface.

== Distribution and habitat ==
Asterina pancerii is endemic to the Mediterranean Sea. It is most common on the Mediterranean coasts of Spain, France and Italy, but has also been reported from the coasts of Tunisia, Libya, Malta, Greece, Crete and Turkey. Some of these populations in the eastern Mediterranean may turn out to be a new species when genetic testing is done. Asterina pancerii appears to be a rare species, but this may be because it is seldom noticed because of its small size and unobtrusive behaviour. It usually occurs in seagrass meadows, particularly Posidonia oceanica. Although most frequently seen at depths between 3 and 9 m (10 and 30 ft), it sometimes occurs in deeper meadows at down to 40 m (130 ft).

== Ecology ==
Asterina pancerii is probably a predator, feeding on microorganisms on the surface of the seagrass blades. It is a sequential hermaphrodite, starting life as a female and later becoming a male. The eggs are deposited on the substrate where, after being fertilised, they are brooded by the female. They undergo direct development, with no planktonic larval phase, and crawl away from the female when sufficiently large.
