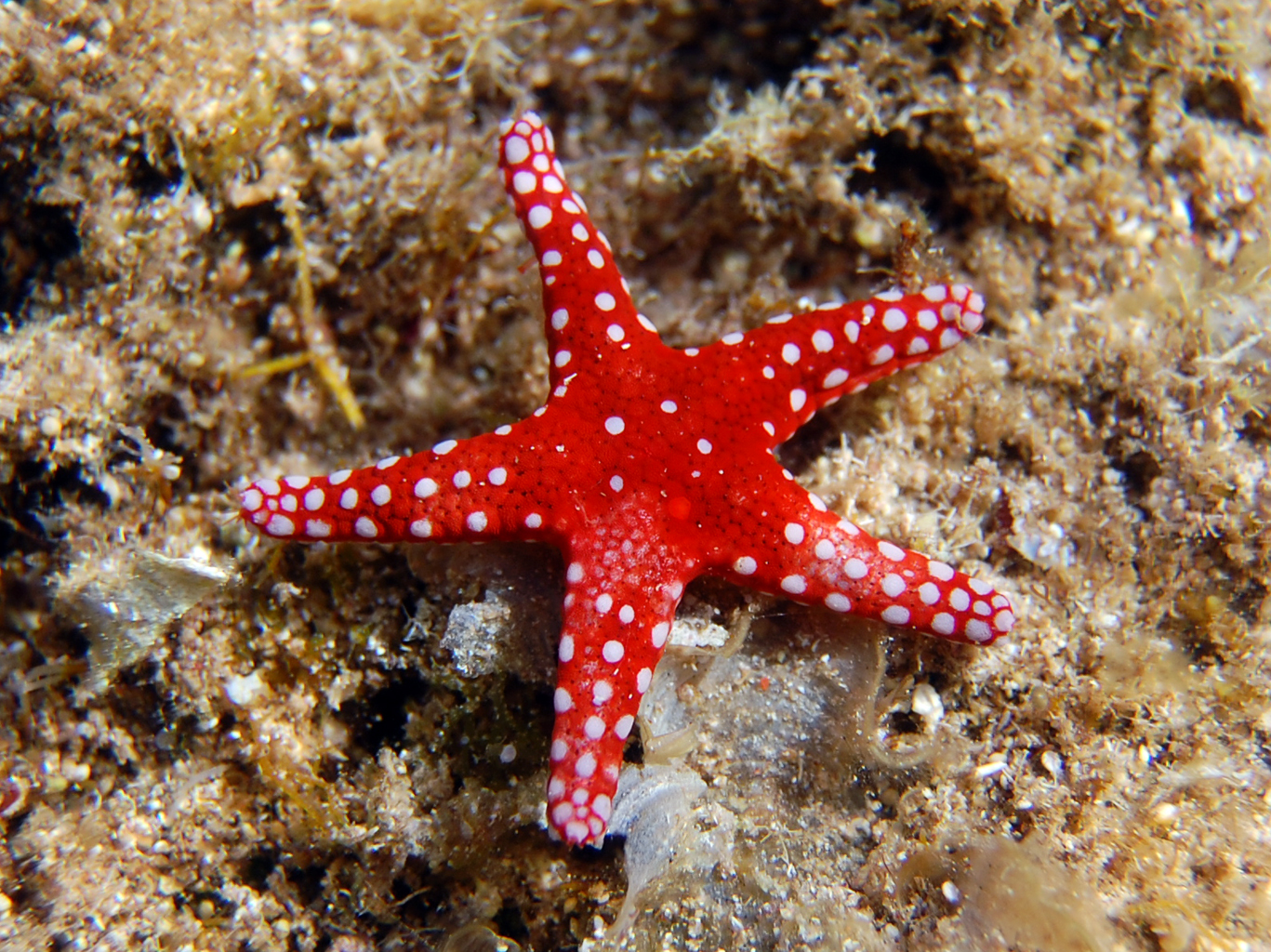

Scientific classification
- Kingdom: Animalia
- Phylum: Echinodermata
- Class: Asteroidea
- Order: Valvatida
- Family: Goniasteridae
- Genus: Fromia
- Species: F. ghardaqana

Binomial name
- Fromia ghardaqana Mortensen, 1938

Synonyms
- Scytaster milleporellus Müller & Troschel, 1842

= Fromia ghardaqana =

Species of starfish

Fromia ghardaqana, common name Ghardaqa sea star, is a species of marine starfish in the family Goniasteridae.

== Distribution ==
It has been found between 33.7 and 40.1 longitude and 15.3 to 28.6 latitude.

== Habitat ==
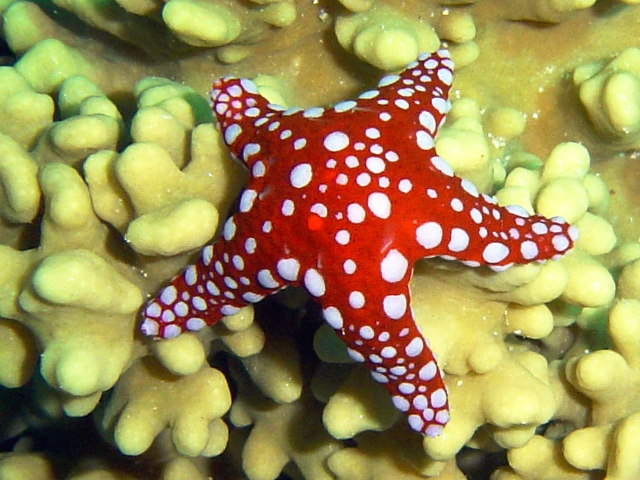

Specimens have been collected from ocean depths between 5 metres (16 ft) and 15 metres (49 ft). It lives in 28.593 °C (83.467 °F) water.
