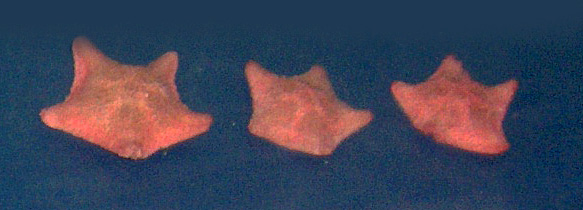

Scientific classification
- Kingdom: Animalia
- Phylum: Echinodermata
- Class: Asteroidea
- Order: Valvatida
- Family: Asterinidae
- Genus: Asterina
- Species: A. gibbosa

Binomial name
- Asterina gibbosa (Pennant, 1777)

Synonyms
- Asterias exigua Delle Chiaje, 1825; Asterias gibbosa Pennant, 1777; Asterias membranacea Risso, 1826; Asterias minuta Gmelin, 1788; Asterias papyracea Konrad, 1814; Asterias pulchella de Blainville, 1834; Asterias umbilicata Konrad, 1814; Asterias verruculata Retzius, 1805; Asterina crassispina H.L. Clark, 1928; Asterina minuta Nardo, 1834; Asteriscus arrecifensis Greeff, 1872; Asteriscus ciliatus Lorenz, 1860; Asteriscus gibbosa Fischer, 1869; Asteriscus pulchellus Perrier, 1869; Asteriscus verruculatus (Retzius, 1805)

= Asterina gibbosa =

Species of starfish

Asterina gibbosa, commonly known as the starlet cushion star, is a species of starfish in the family Asterinidae. It is native to the northeastern Atlantic Ocean and the Mediterranean Sea.

== Description ==
Asterina gibbosa is a pentagonal starfish with short blunt arms and an inflated appearance. The aboral (upper) surface is clothed in groups of short, blunt spines. This starfish grows to a diameter of about 5 centimetres (2.0 in) and may be brown, green or orange. It is sometimes blotched with colour and individuals from deeper sea locations tend to be paler in colour. It can be distinguished from the closely related Asterina phylactica by the fact that it has two small spines on each of the plates surrounding its mouth, A. phylactica having no spines on these plates and having a plain olive-green aboral surface with a brown central star. A. gibbosa, at 5 centimetres (2.0 in) is considerably bigger than A. phylactica which seldom exceeds 15 mm (0.6 in). At one time the two were believed to be the same species but it was realised in 1979 that besides the differences in appearance, the two occupied different ecological niches and had different reproductive strategies.

== Biology ==
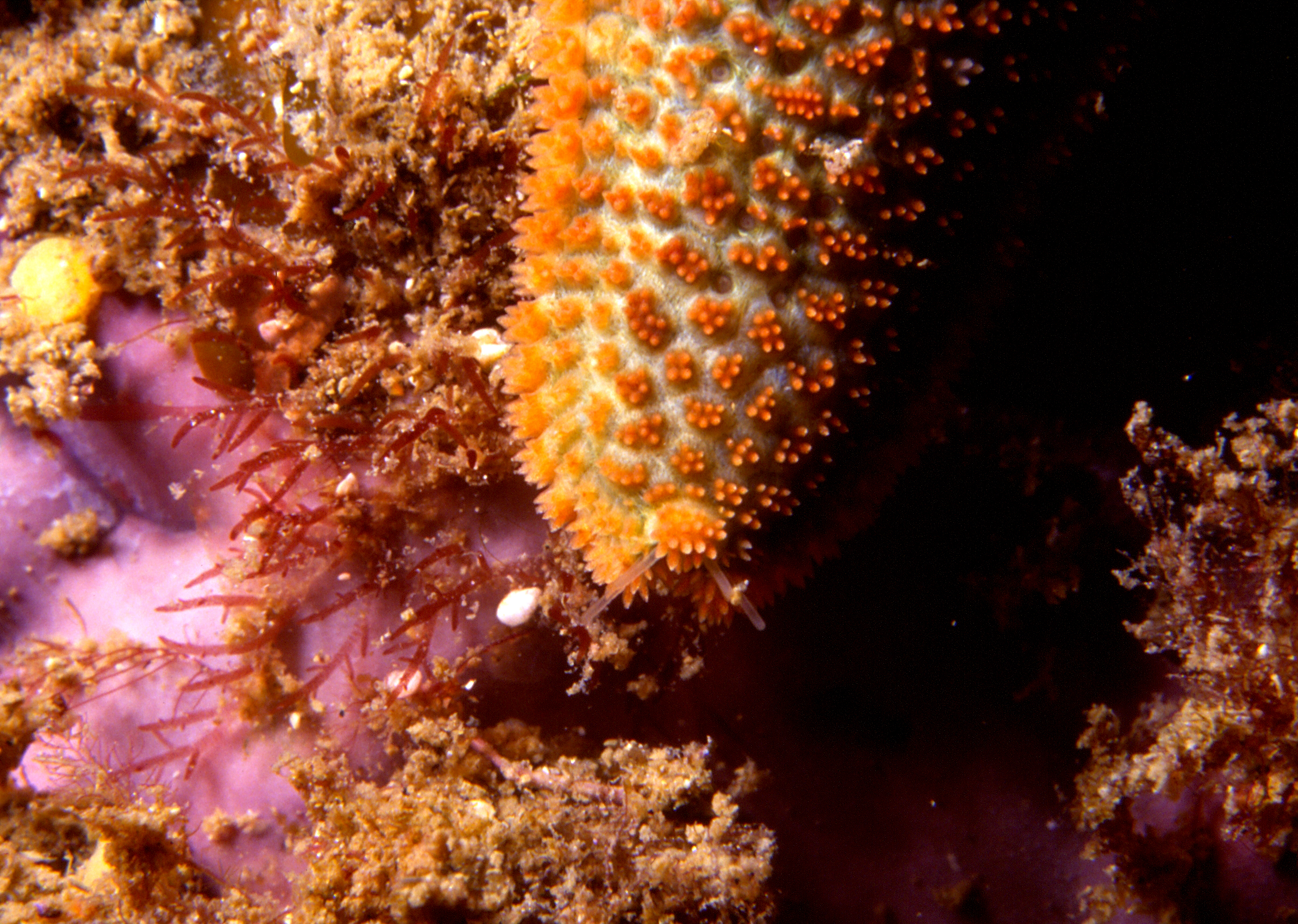
Tip of arm showing eyespot

Asterina gibbosa is mainly nocturnal, spending the day underneath boulders, overhangs or in caves, or hidden away under algae in rock pools. It is an opportunistic scavenger but the bulk of its diet comes from the film of bacteria and diatoms that exist on the surface of rocks. It feeds by everting its stomach (turning it inside out) against the surface of the rock and secreting enzymes which digest the film. Other foods found in its stomach included decaying toothed wrack (Fucus serratus), periwinkle faeces and bits of dead molluscs such as mussels (Mytilus edulis), oysters (Ostrea edulis) and periwinkles (Littorina littorea), but 95% of the stomachs contained no large particles indicating the importance in its diet of microscopic organisms.

Asterina gibbosa is a protandric hermaphrodite. This means that it is born a male and later changes sex and becomes a female. Researchers found that at Plymouth, United Kingdom, the sex change happens when it has an arm length somewhere between 9 and 16 millimetres (0.35 and 0.63 in). Other researchers at Naples, Italy found that Mediterranean populations did not have such a clearcut change of sex. In the first year cohort, with arms averaging 11 millimetres (0.43 in), about 80% were male. In the second year batch, with arms averaging 17 millimetres (0.67 in), about 30% were male. By the third year, with 25 millimetres (0.98 in) arms, males were very scarce, but in even larger individuals of unknown age, about 15% were male. Asterina gibbosa may live for six years or more.

The eggs of Asterina gibbosa are laid in a mass and glued to the substrate by their jelly-like coating. Each developing embryo feeds on its egg yolk and hatches directly into a brachiolaria larva, without the intervening mobile planktonic phase of most starfish larvae. The larva has a pair of asymmetric arms which gradually lengthen, and an adhesive disc with which it cements itself to the seabed. It then undergoes metamorphosis, its arms are reabsorbed and tube feet develop and take on the role of anchoring it to the seabed. Later the mouth of the juvenile starfish develops and it is able to start feeding.

== Distribution and habitat ==
Asterina gibbosa is found in the northeastern Atlantic Ocean and the Mediterranean Sea. Its range extends from England, Scotland, Ireland and the southern North Sea southwards to the Mediterranean Sea, Morocco, Tunisia, the Azores, Cape Verde Islands, the Canary Islands and Madeira. It is found from the lower shore down to a depth of about 125 metres (410 ft) in pools, on rocks, under boulders and overhangs.
