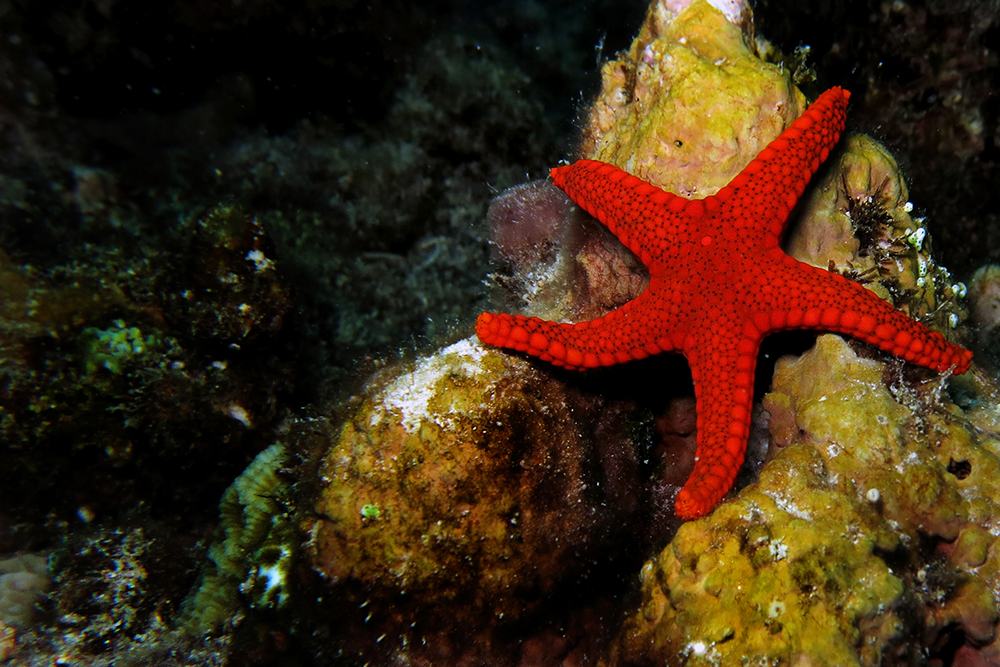

Scientific classification
- Kingdom: Animalia
- Phylum: Echinodermata
- Class: Asteroidea
- Order: Valvatida
- Family: Goniasteridae
- Genus: Fromia
- Species: F. hemiopla

Binomial name
- Fromia hemiopla Fisher, 1913

= Fromia hemiopla =

Species of starfish

Fromia hemiopla, common name armoured sea star, is a species of marine starfish belonging to the family Goniasteridae.
