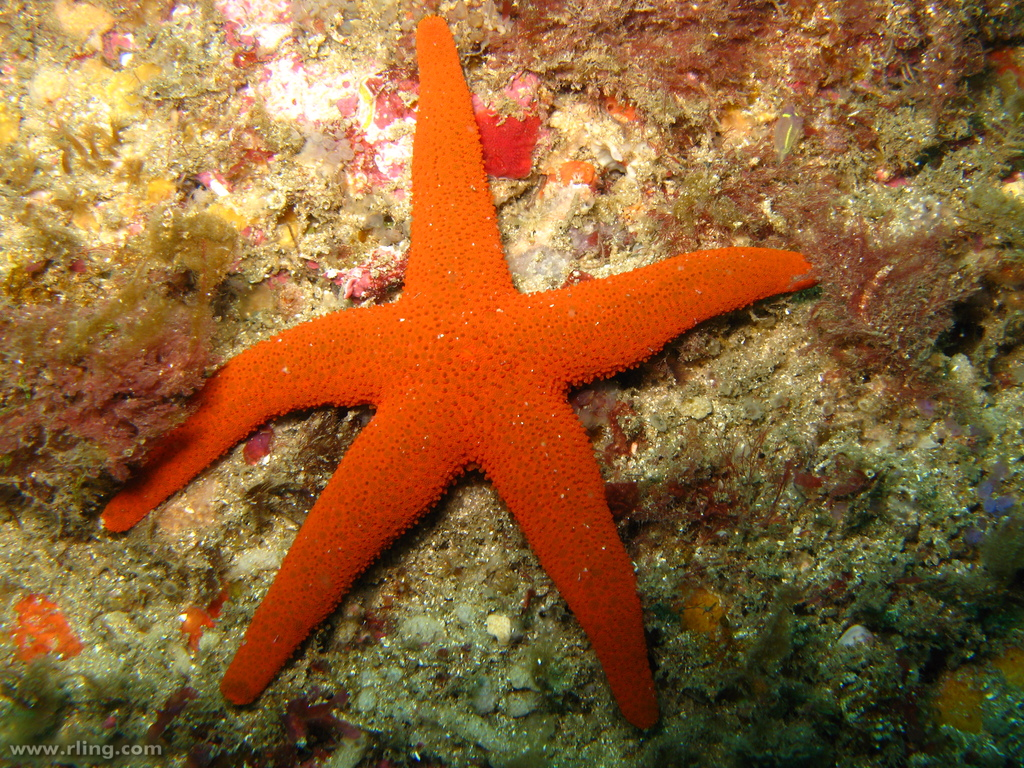
- Austrofromia polypora at Inscription Pt, Botany Bay, NSW

Scientific classification
- Domain: Eukaryota
- Kingdom: Animalia
- Phylum: Echinodermata
- Class: Asteroidea
- Order: Valvatida
- Family: Goniasteridae
- Genus: Fromia
- Species: F. polypora

Binomial name
- Fromia polypora H.L. Clark, 1916

Synonyms
- Austrofromia polypora (H.L. Clark, 1916)

= Fromia polypora =

Species of starfish

Fromia polypora, commonly called many-pored sea star or many-spotted seastar, is a species of marine starfish belonging to the family Goniasteridae.

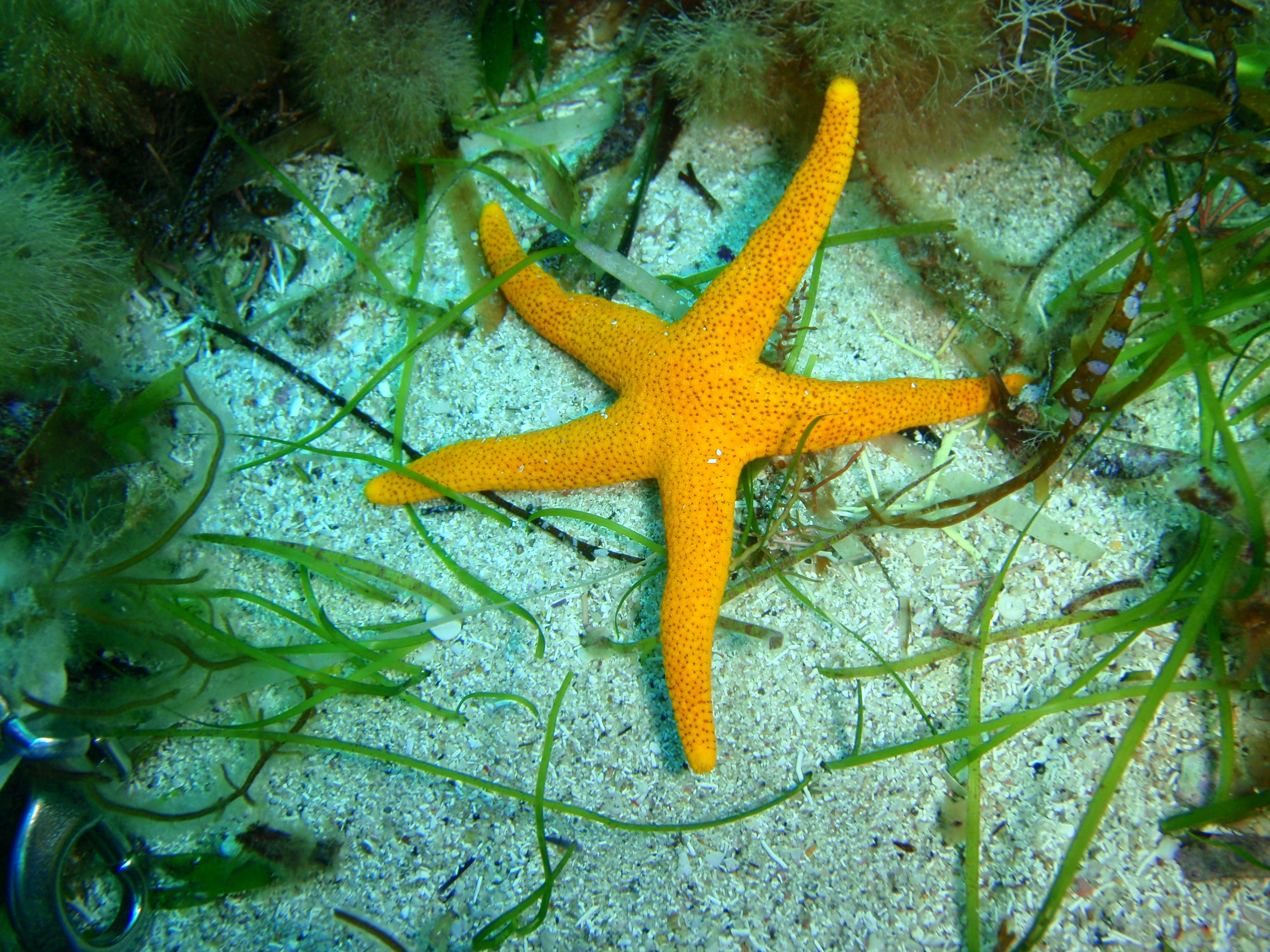

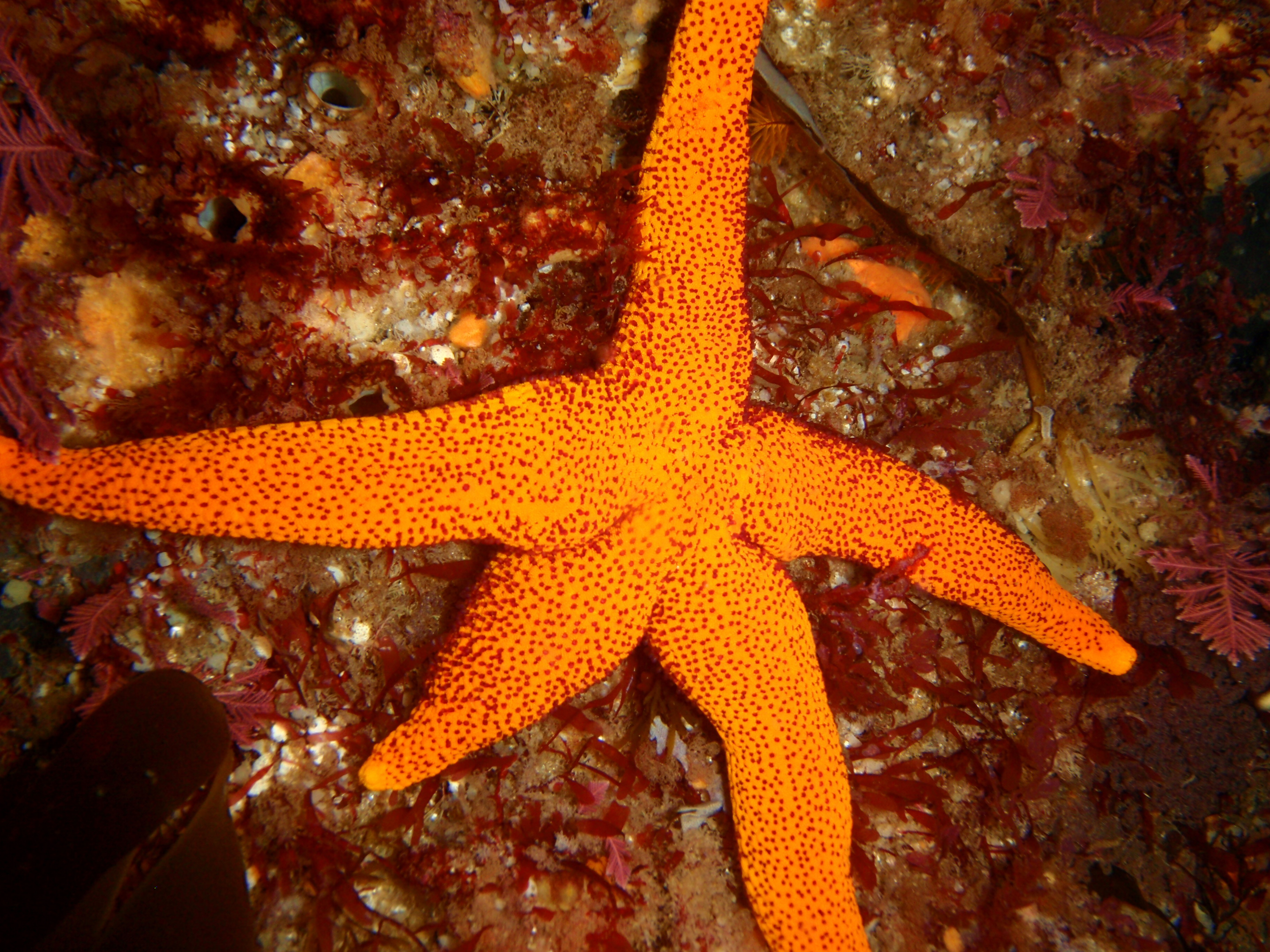

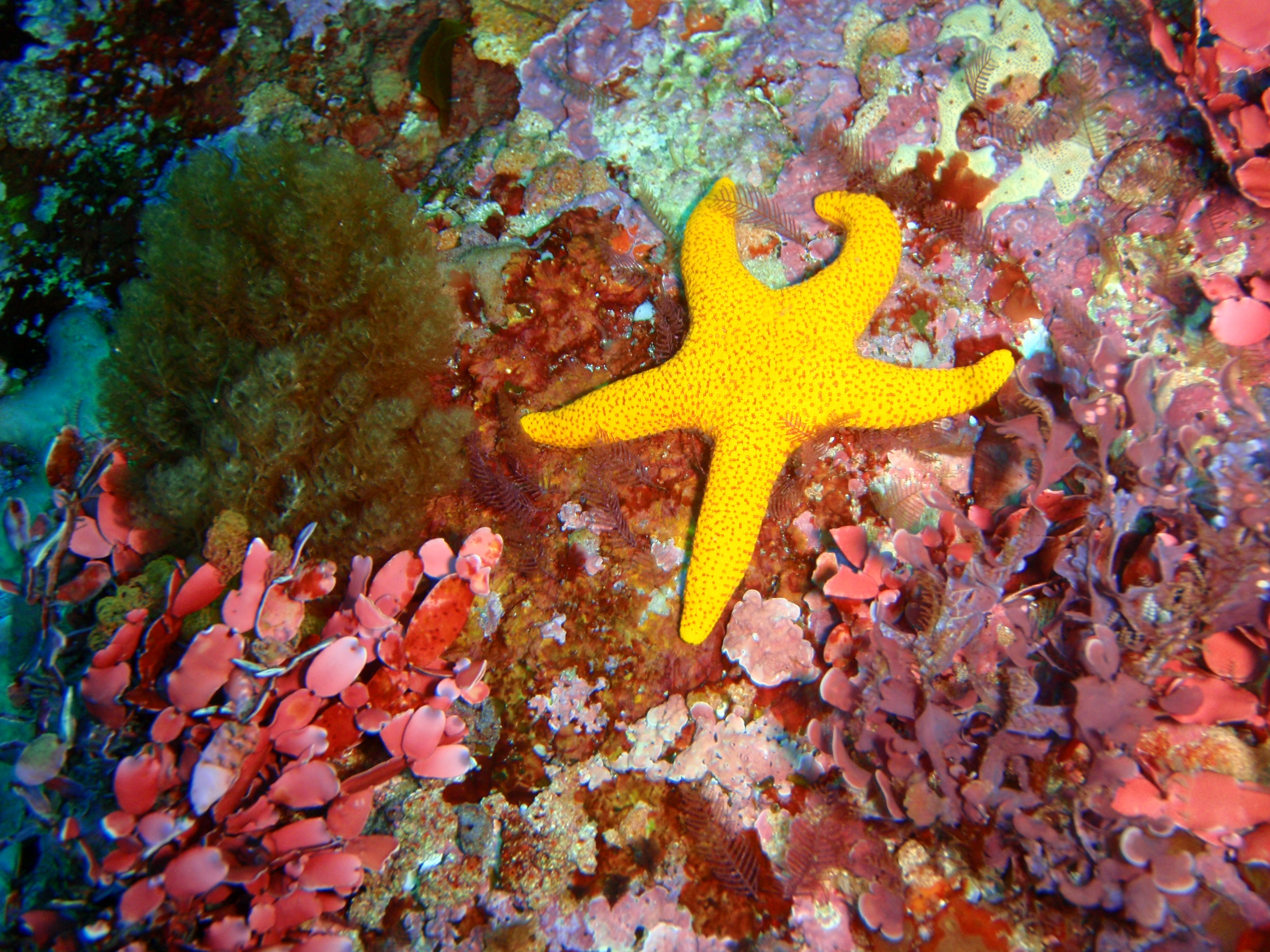

== Distribution ==
It has been found at latitudes of between 23.5 and -29.1 degrees, and longitudes of between 151.93 and 167.99 degrees.

== Ecology ==
It has been found at depths of 3 metres (9.8 ft) to 16 metres (52 ft).
