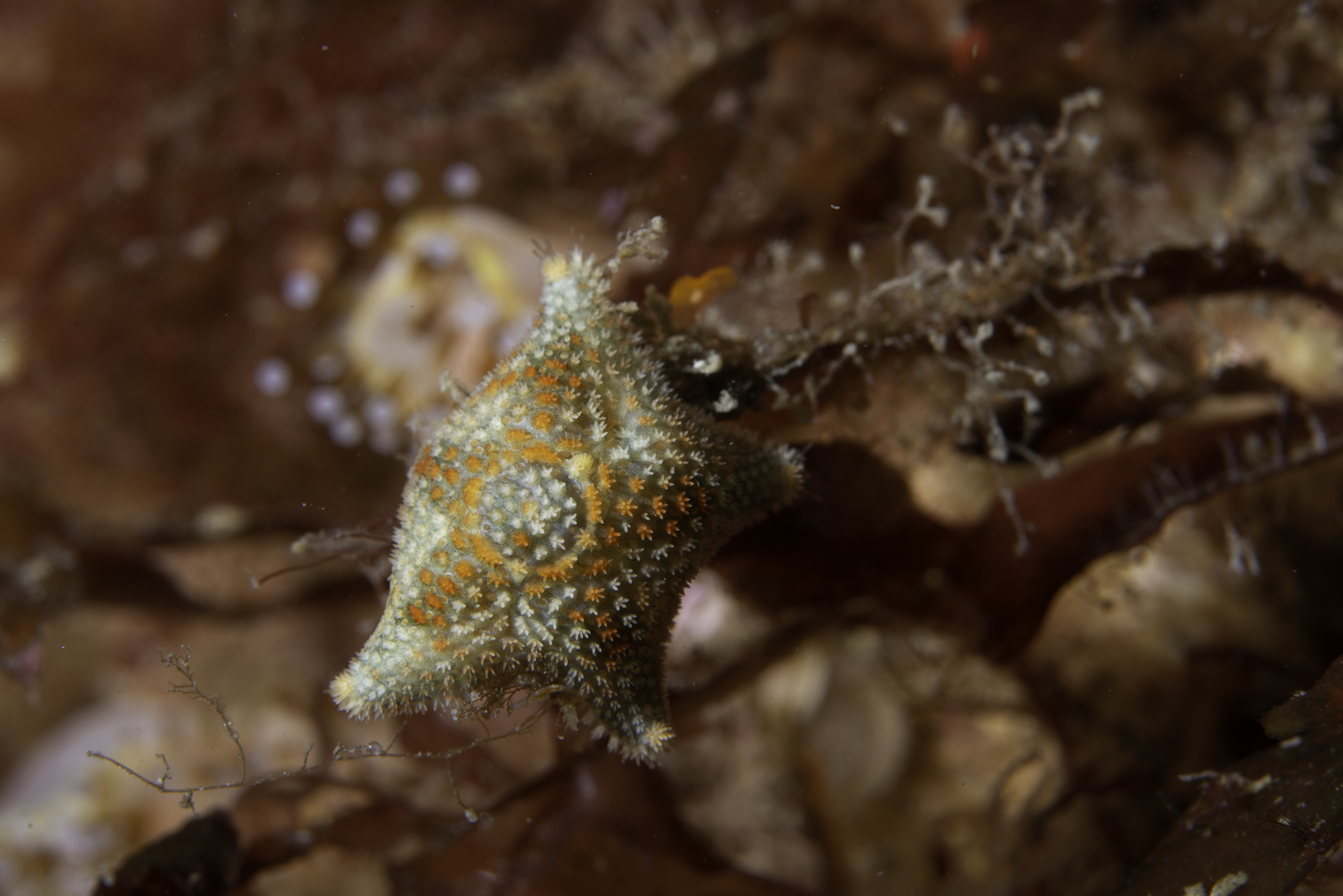

Scientific classification
- Kingdom: Animalia
- Phylum: Echinodermata
- Class: Asteroidea
- Order: Valvatida
- Family: Asterinidae
- Genus: Asterina
- Species: A. phylactica

Binomial name
- Asterina phylactica (Emson and Crump, 1979)

= Asterina phylactica =

Species of starfish

Asterina phylactica is a species of sea star. It can be found in geographically widespread sites around the British Isles and in the Mediterranean Sea. It has five arms, is about 1.5 cm across and is of a green colour with central brown markings. The species was formally described in 1979 and is very similar to Asterina gibbosa.

== Description ==
Asterina phylactica is a pentagonal starfish with short blunt arms and a flattened shape. It grows to a diameter of about 15 mm (0.6 in) and is olive-green with a central brown star-shaped marking, a pale underside, and a clear cut edge between the upper and lower surfaces. It can be distinguished from the closely related Asterina gibbosa by the fact that it has fewer plates surrounding its mouth, its smaller size and its characteristic colouring. At one time the two were believed to be the same species but it was realised in 1979 that besides the differences in appearance, the two occupied different ecological niches and had different reproductive methods.

== Distribution and habitat ==
Asterina phylactica is native to the northwestern Atlantic, the Mediterranean and Adriatic Seas. Around the British Isles, Asterina phylactica is found around the south-west coasts but also occurs on the west coasts of Scotland and north-west Ireland. In Wales, the typical habitat for this species is rock pools on exposed coasts with much encrusting coralline algae. It is a tolerant species and able to adapt to a range of different salinities and temperatures.

== Biology ==
Asterina phylactica feeds on the film of bacteria and diatoms that exists on the surface of rocks. To do this it everts its stomach and presses it against the rock before secreting digestive enzymes. In their first year, individuals of Asterina phylactica are all males but in the following year they become hermaphrodite and produce both sperm and eggs. The breeding season is late spring and several individuals come together in a group. Sperm is liberated into the sea and the eggs are fertilised. The developing embryos are retained under the starfish where they are brooded for about three weeks. The eggs have direct development and metamorphose into juvenile starfish which crawl out from under their mother and disperse. The lifespan is probably about two years as females normally die after they have brooded their young.
