= Asterina hoensonae =

Scientific classification
- Kingdom: Animalia
- Phylum: Echinodermata
- Class: Asteroidea
- Order: Valvatida
- Family: Asterinidae
- Genus: Asterina
- Species: A. hoensonae

Binomial name
- Asterina hoensonae O'Loughlin, 2009

Species of starfish

Asterina hoensonae is a species of pentagonal starfish in the family Asterinidae. The holotype was collected at Cape Agulhas, South Africa.

== Etymology ==
The specific epithet "hoensonae" refers to Elizabeth Hoenson of the South Africa Museum who "went to considerable lengths to make available essential loans for this work".
