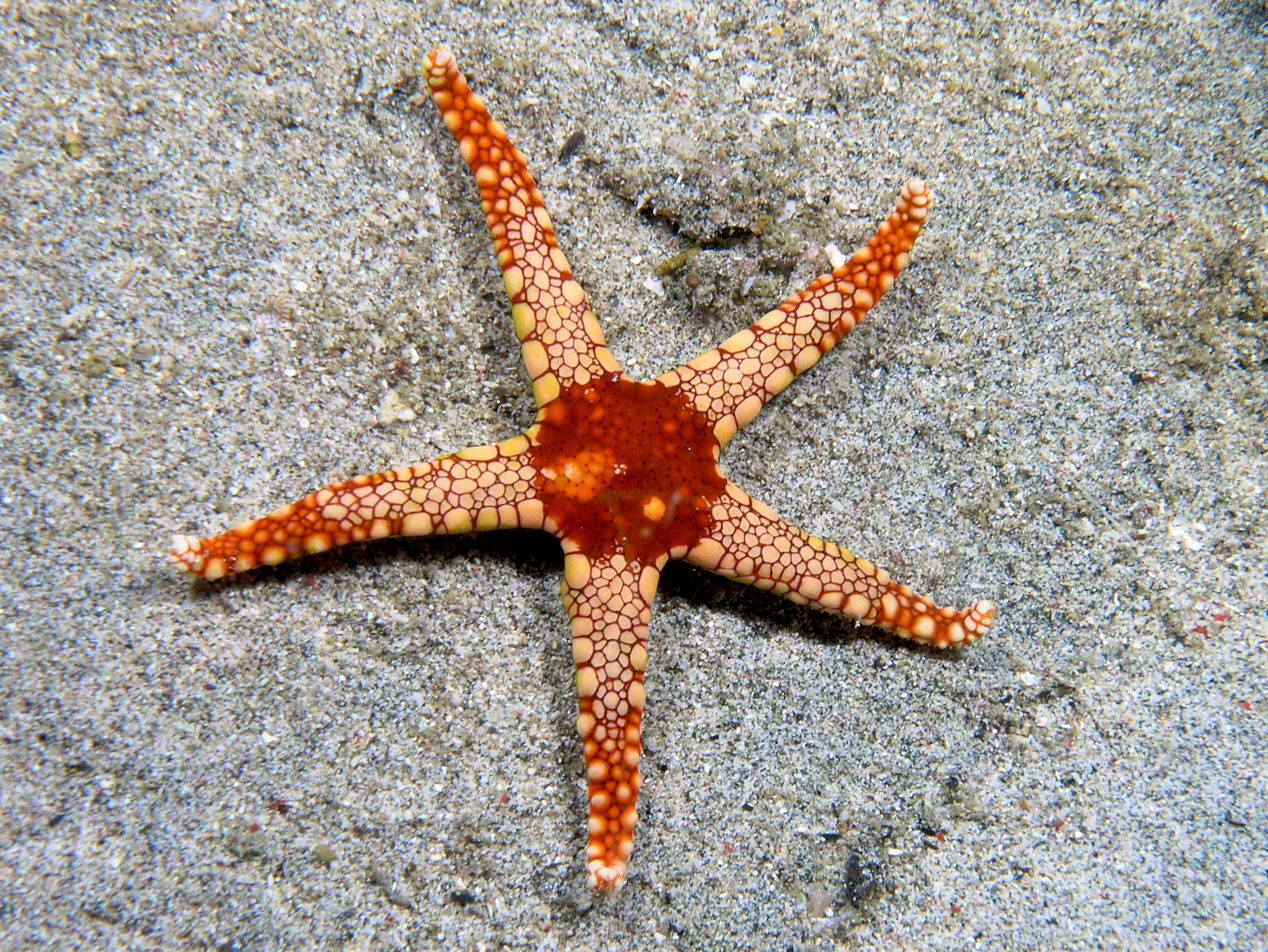
- Fromia monilis in Borneo

Scientific classification
- Kingdom: Animalia
- Phylum: Echinodermata
- Class: Asteroidea
- Order: Valvatida
- Family: Goniasteridae
- Genus: Fromia; Gray, 1840

Type species
- Fromia milleporella (Lamarck, 1816)

Synonyms
- Austrofromia H.L. Clark, 1921; Celerina A.M. Clark, 1967

= Fromia =

Genus of starfishes

Fromia is a genus of starfish belonging to the family Goniasteridae.

== Description ==
These species are tropical sea stars, with 5 arms but sometimes up to 7. Some species like Fromia monilis or Fromia nodosa can be very difficult to identify, as they look like each other a lot, and even like unrelated species as those of the genus Paraferdinia.

== Species ==
Image	Scientific name	Distribution
	Fromia armata Koehler, 1910	Indian Ocean
	Fromia balanse Perrier, 1875	Pacific Ocean
	Fromia baruna Mah, 2025	Indonesia
	Fromia bathybia Mah, 2026	New Caledonia (deep)
	Fromia elegans H.L. Clark, 1921	Pacific Ocean
	Fromia eusticha Fisher, 1913	Pacific Ocean
	Fromia ghardaqana Mortensen, 1938	Red Sea
	Fromia hadracantha H.L. Clark, 1921	Pacific Ocean
	Fromia heffernani (Livingstone, 1931)	Pacific Ocean
	Fromia hemiopla Fisher, 1913	Indonesia
	Fromia indica (Perrier, 1869)	Indo-Pacific
	Fromia labeosa Arai & Fujita, 2021	Southern Japan (deep)
	Fromia milleporella (Lamarck, 1816)	Indo-Pacific
	Fromia monilis (Perrier, 1869)	Pacific Ocean
	Fromia nodosa A.M. Clark, 1967	Indian ocean
	Fromia pacifica H.L. Clark, 1921	Pacific Ocean
	Fromia polypora H.L. Clark, 1916	Southern Australia
	Fromia schultzei Döderlein, 1910	South Africa
	Fromia subtilis (Lutken, 1871)	
	Fromia ui Mah in Mah et al. 2026	North-west Australia

== Bibliography ==
- Christopher Mah, "Overview of the Ferdina-like Goniasteridae (Echinodermata: Asteroidea) including a new subfamily, three new genera and fourteen new species", Zootaxa, vol. 4271, 2017
- Sprung, Julian y Delbeek, J.Charles- The Reef Aquarium. Volume two - Ricordea Publishing
- Debelius, Helmut y Baensch, Hans A - Atlas Marino - Mergus
- Gosliner, Beherens y Williams. Coral Reef Animals of the Indo-Pacific. Sea Challenger
- Debelius, Helmut. Guía de especies del arrecife Pacífico-Asiático. M&G Difusión. 2001
- Lieske, Ewald & Myers, Robert. Coral Reef Guide: Red Sea. HarperCollins Publishers. 2004.
