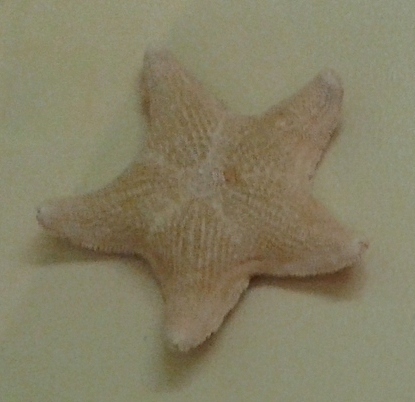

Scientific classification
- Kingdom: Animalia
- Phylum: Echinodermata
- Class: Asteroidea
- Order: Valvatida
- Family: Asterinidae
- Genus: Asterina
- Species: A. stellifera

Binomial name
- Asterina stellifera Möbius, 1859

Synonyms
- Asterina luderitziana; Asteriscus brasiliensis; Asteriscus minutus; Asteriscus stellifer; Enoplopatiria marginata; Enoplopatiria siderea; Enoplopatiria stellifera; Patiria stellifera

= Asterina stellifera =

Species of starfish (sea star)

Asterina stellifera is one of thirty species of small bat star in the genus Asterina. It is mainly found on the east coast of South America, ranging from Cabo Frio, Brazil to Mar del Plata, Argentina. In the past decades, their numbers have depleted and are currently abundant only in the southern limit of its former range. Due to this decline, it is on Brazil’s endangered species list. It has a slow growth rate and relatively long lifespan. A. stellifera is an omnivorous generalist predator, and modifies the abundance of other invertebrates and algae in subtidal marine communities.

== Anatomy ==
This type of sea star grows five arms and can reach up to 80.0 millimetres (3.15 in) in length, though most stay around 50 millimetres (2.0 in). The size is found to vary with depth, larger sea stars are found deeper while smaller ones are usually found in shallow waters. The can be found in a variety of colors, mainly white and brownish, but also can be an orange-red color. All sea stars have tube feet that are controlled by hydraulic pressure. They can be found arranged in grooves along the arms. Tube feet are used to move around, they can attach to all different surfaces, feeding by passing food along the arms and to the mouth which is located at the center of the organism and for respiration. Sea stars do not have gills or lungs for respiration, they rely on their tube feet and papules, or skin gills, to take oxygen out of the surrounding water and move it into their bodies.

== Reproduction ==
Asterina stellifera has a defined annual and synchronous reproductive cycle. This cycle is affected by seawater temperature and day-length, they increase chances of fertilization by controlling gametogenesis (a process in which one cell splits to form four more cells). Reproduction is also regulated by planktonic food supply. A. stellifera can reproduce asexually by breaking apart into smaller parts and regrowing the missing limb. This explains why Asterina can be found living with less than five arms. Asterian sea stars also reproduce through dispersal of eggs. At the beginning of reproduction, many starfish belonging to the asteroid species form aggregations, nothing has been researched for A. stellifera but it can be assumed they would also mate like this. It is known that other Asterina species deposit up to 1000 eggs in a specific location in the process of reproduction. They mainly deposit underneath large rocks or corals. Scientists have also found that several males will surround one female during reproduction. From this, we can infer that A. stellifera would do this, but it has not yet been researched fully.

== Ecology ==
Asterina stellifera feeds on macroalgae, bryozoans, tunicates, polyps, and biofilm as well as different types of kelp.

Asterina stellifera is one of the few asteroid species found in the rocky coast of the South Atlantic Ocean. They stay in the coastal zones near rocky outcroppings and most can be found around 6–8 metres (20–26 ft) down.

The accelerating development of Mar del Plata shoreline for industry, agriculture, and tourism during the last decade is degrading coastal ecosystems by habitat disturbance and pollution. On top of that, the recent arrival of two invasive species into the sea stars last remaining habitat, the kelp Undaria pinnatifida and the sea slug Pleurobranchaea maculata add potential threats. The kelp competes for space, not only the space of A. stellifera but also that of its prey. P. maculata has a large overlap of prey with A. stellifera, decreasing the amount available for the sea star.

== Research ==
A study was performed to model individual growth and explore the relationship of changes in local abundance with variation in environmental factors and the reproductive status of individuals. They studied the relationship between male and female organ wet weights with seawater temperature, salinity, monthly mean precipitation, and day-length. It was found that seawater temperature and day-length appear to influence the rapid increase of gonads and it was also found that gamete release failure is not the cause of the scarcity of new sea stars.

Asterina stellifera was also used to explore the structure of the mucous granules in the tube feet of sea stars. It was found that A. stellifera mucous granules had a rounded profile, which is an indication that they have an ellipsoidal shape in three dimensions. They were also organized in a regular hexagonal array, indicating that there could be some kind of binding material giving the bundle the shape of a hexagonal rod. This was different than what had been previously discovered, electron microscopic studies of various tissues containing mucus-secreting cells all showed a lack of an organized structure.
