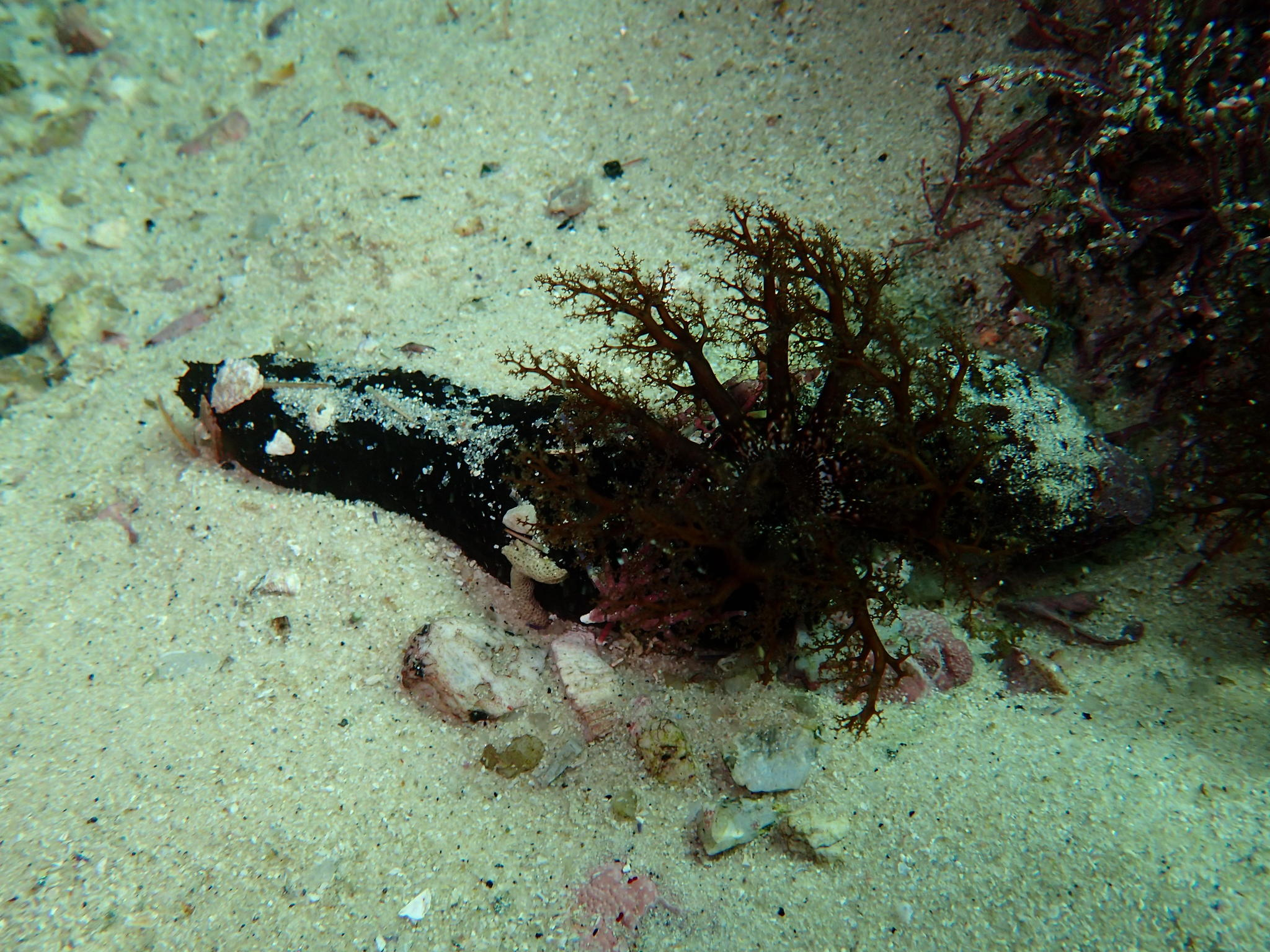
- Roweia stephensoni

Scientific classification
- Kingdom: Animalia
- Phylum: Echinodermata
- Class: Holothuroidea
- Order: Dendrochirotida
- Family: Cucumariidae
- Genus: Roweia; Thandar, 1985

= Roweia =

Genus of sea cucumbers

Roweia is a genus of holothurian echinoderms belonging to the family Cucumariidae.

The species of this genus are found in Southern Africa and Southeastern Asia.

Species:

- Roweia frauenfeldi (Ludwig, 1882)
- Roweia stephensoni (John, 1939)
