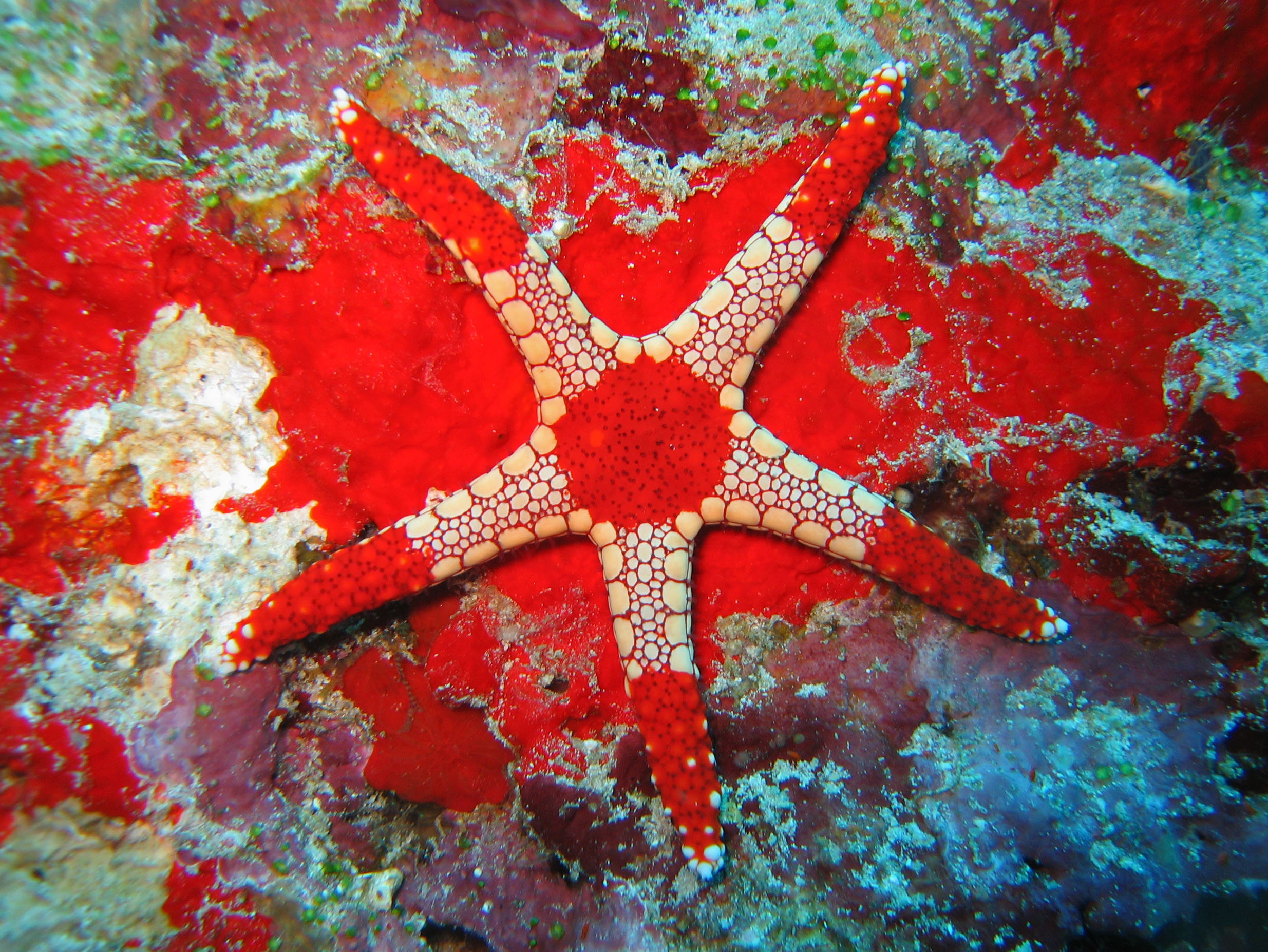
- Fromia monilis in Borneo

Scientific classification
- Kingdom: Animalia
- Phylum: Echinodermata
- Class: Asteroidea
- Order: Valvatida
- Family: Goniasteridae
- Genus: Fromia
- Species: F. monilis

Binomial name
- Fromia monilis (Perrier, 1869)

Synonyms
- Fromia ghardaqana Tortonese, 1979; Fromia japonica Perrier, 1881; Fromia major Koehler, 1895; Linckia milleporella von Martens, 1866; Scytaster monilis Perrier, 1869

= Fromia monilis =

Species of starfish

Fromia monilis, common name necklace starfish or tiled starfish, is a species of starfish belonging to the family Goniasteridae.

== Description ==
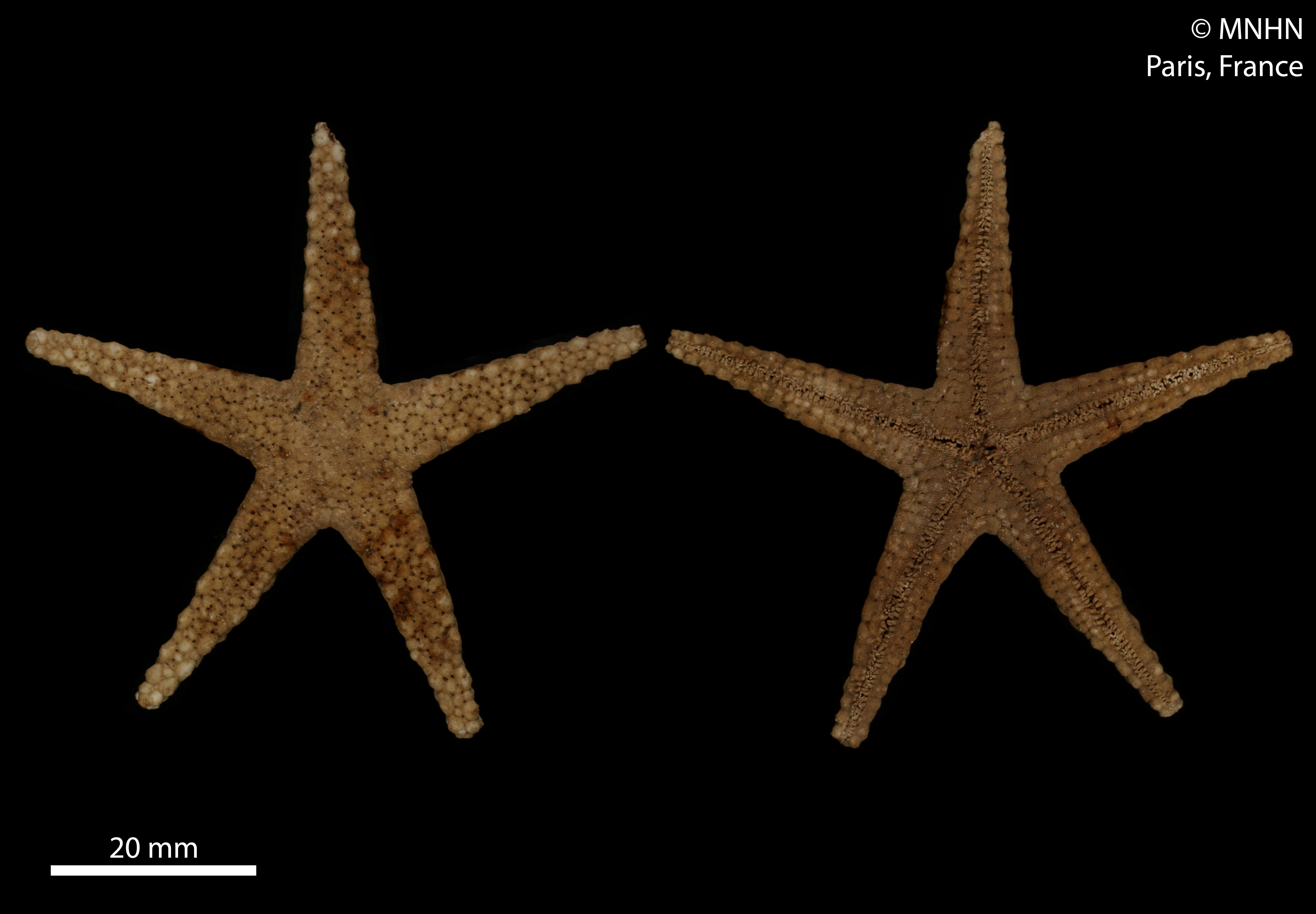
Dried Holotype from MNHN.

Fromia monilis can reach a diameter of about 30 centimetres (12 in). Tips of the arms and the disc center of this starfish are bright red, while the remaining parts are paler, forming large plates.

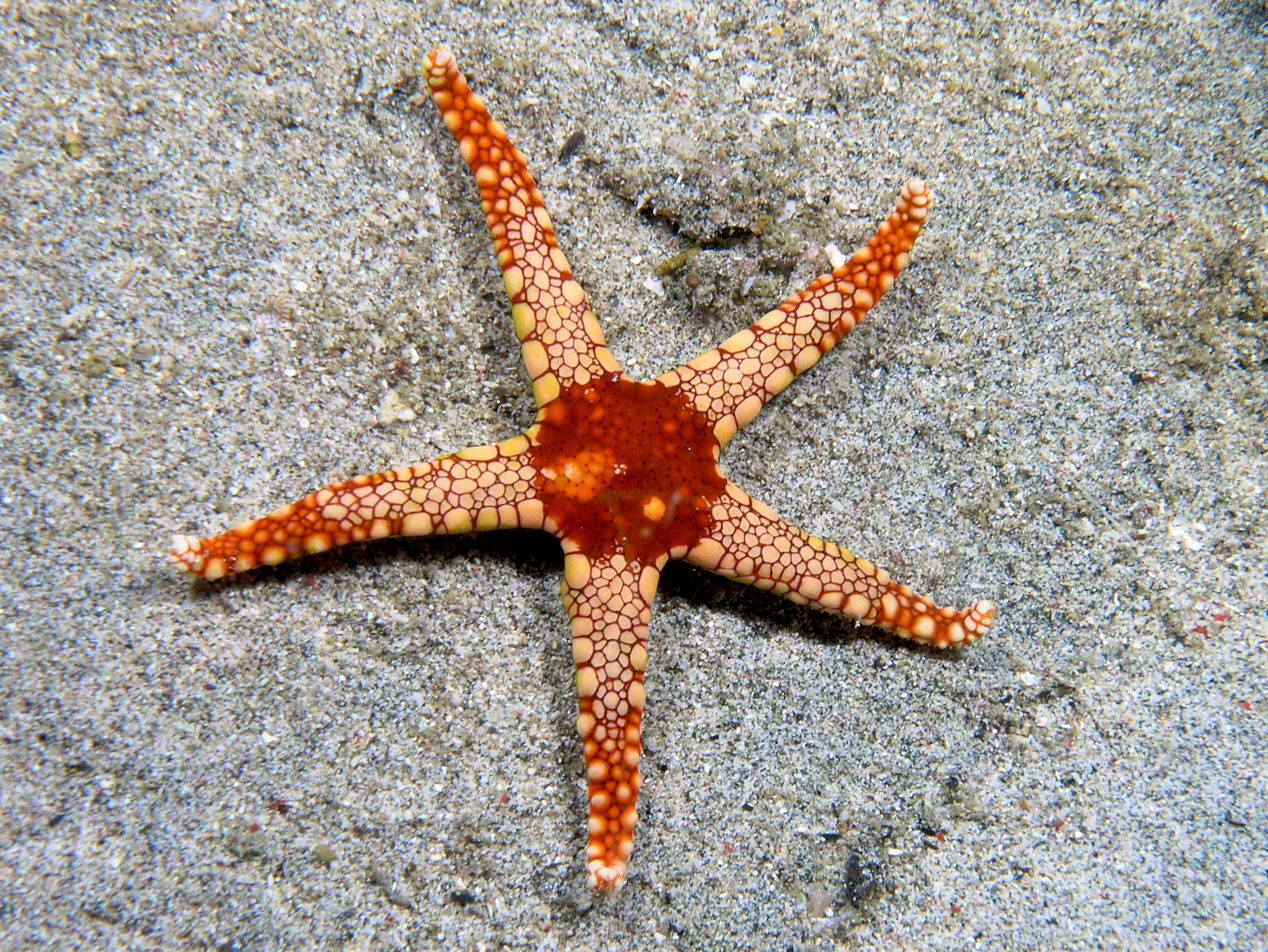

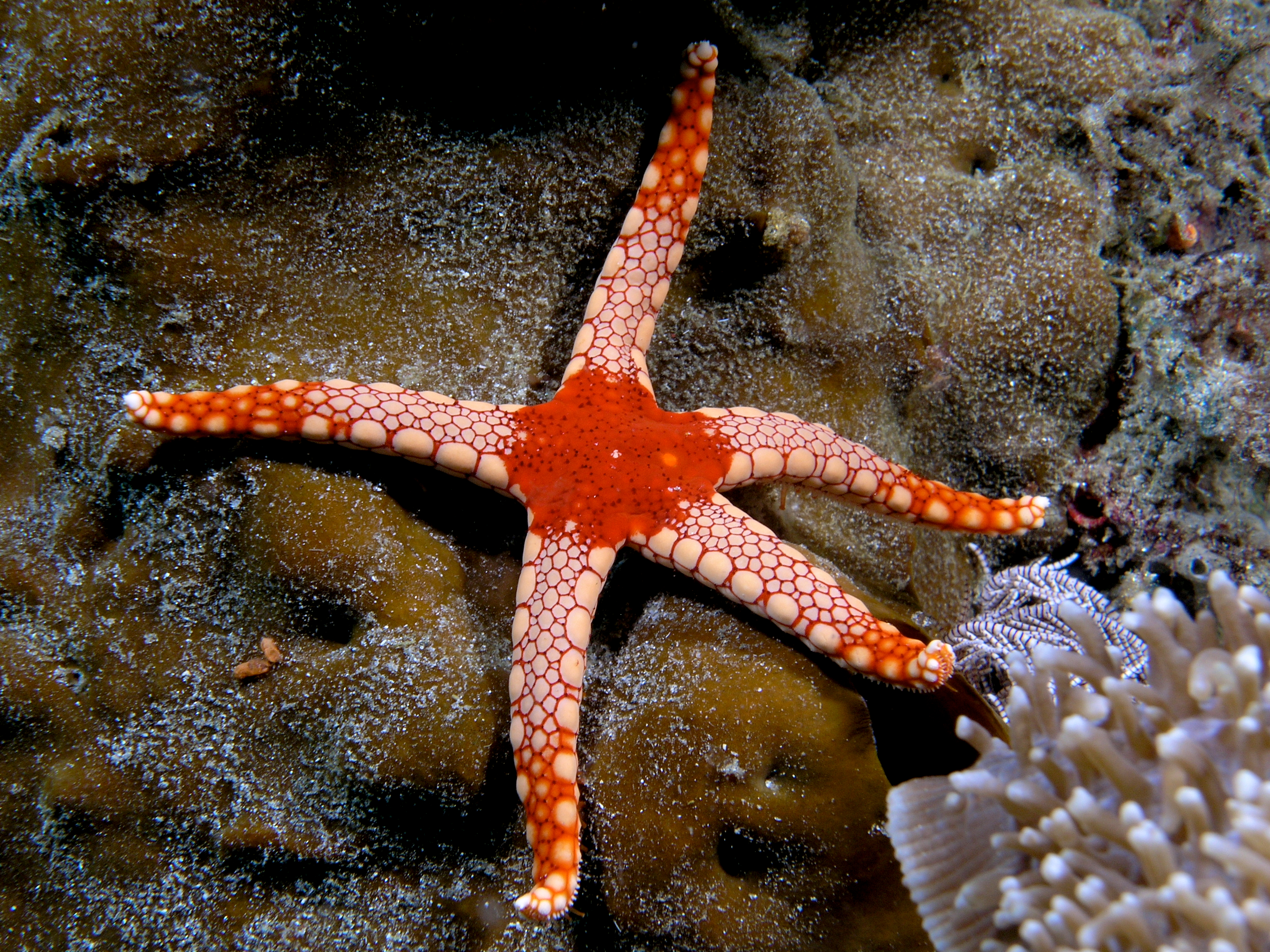
In Timor.

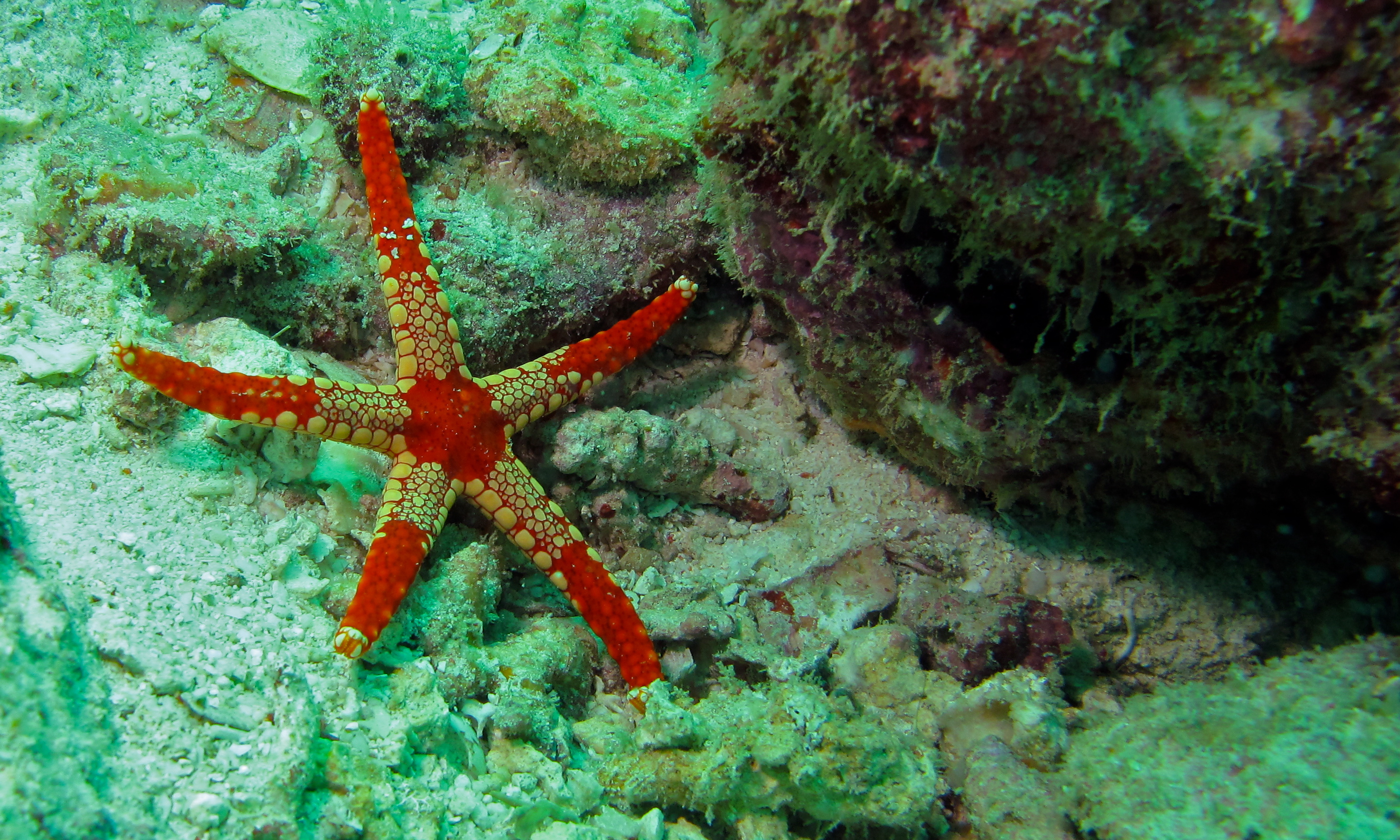
Fromia monilis (Sabah, Malaisia)

The appearance of this sea star can be highly variable (colors, plates, presence of plates on the central disc, armpits...), and its identification using picture can be difficult, as many other species (like Fromia nodosa) can have a very similar aspect.

== Distribution ==
This species can be found in the Indian Ocean and Western Pacific, from the Andaman Islands up to Australia and Japan.

== Ecology ==
It feeds on encrusting sponges, detritus or small invertebrates.

== Nutrition and management of the aquarium ==
The species is also considered in reef aquariums. It feeds on the surface of the stones in thin layers of algae, so it can live only in an old well-ripened aquarium. If the algae are not growing fast enough, supplemental feeding is usually unsuccessful, and this starfish dies of starvation.
