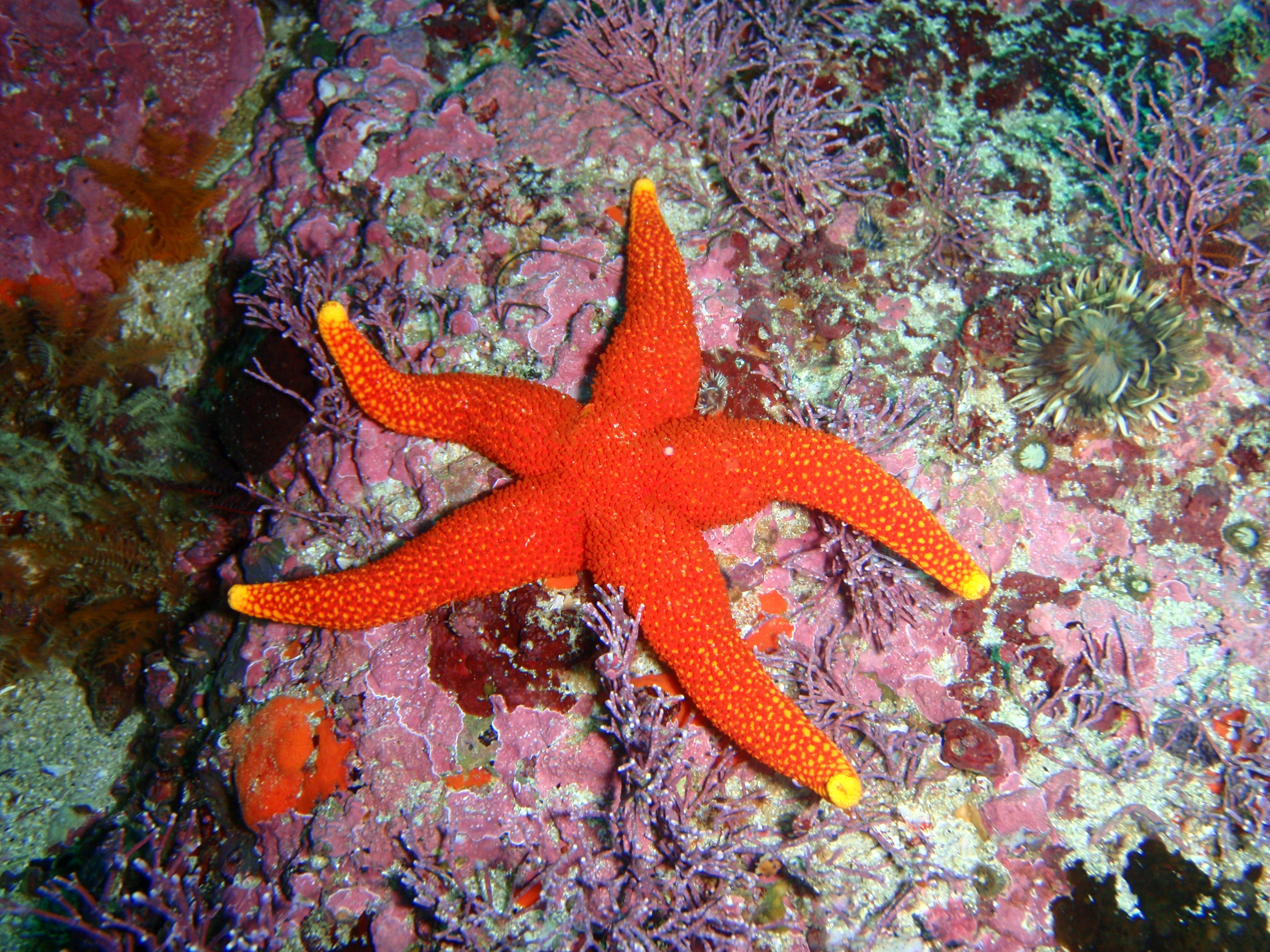

Scientific classification
- Kingdom: Animalia
- Phylum: Echinodermata
- Class: Asteroidea
- Order: Valvatida
- Family: Goniasteridae
- Genus: Fromia
- Species: F. schultzei

Binomial name
- Fromia schultzei Döderlein, 1910

Synonyms
- Austrofromia schultzei (Döderlein, 1910)

= Fromia schultzei =

Species of starfish

Fromia schultzei, commonly known as the granular starfish, is a species of starfish belonging to the family Goniasteridae. It is found on the coasts of South Africa.

== Description ==
This large starfish normally has five arms. It is often about 100 mm (4 in) in diameter, while arms of 14 mm (1 in). The arms are broad at the base tapering gradually to a rounded, upturned tip. The surface is covered with little bumps, giving the starfish a granular appearance. The colour is dark orange, red or purplish. There are few spines in the adambulacral areas, and those there are regularly arranged, helping to distinguish this species from Nardoa tuberculata, which is also found in South African waters.
