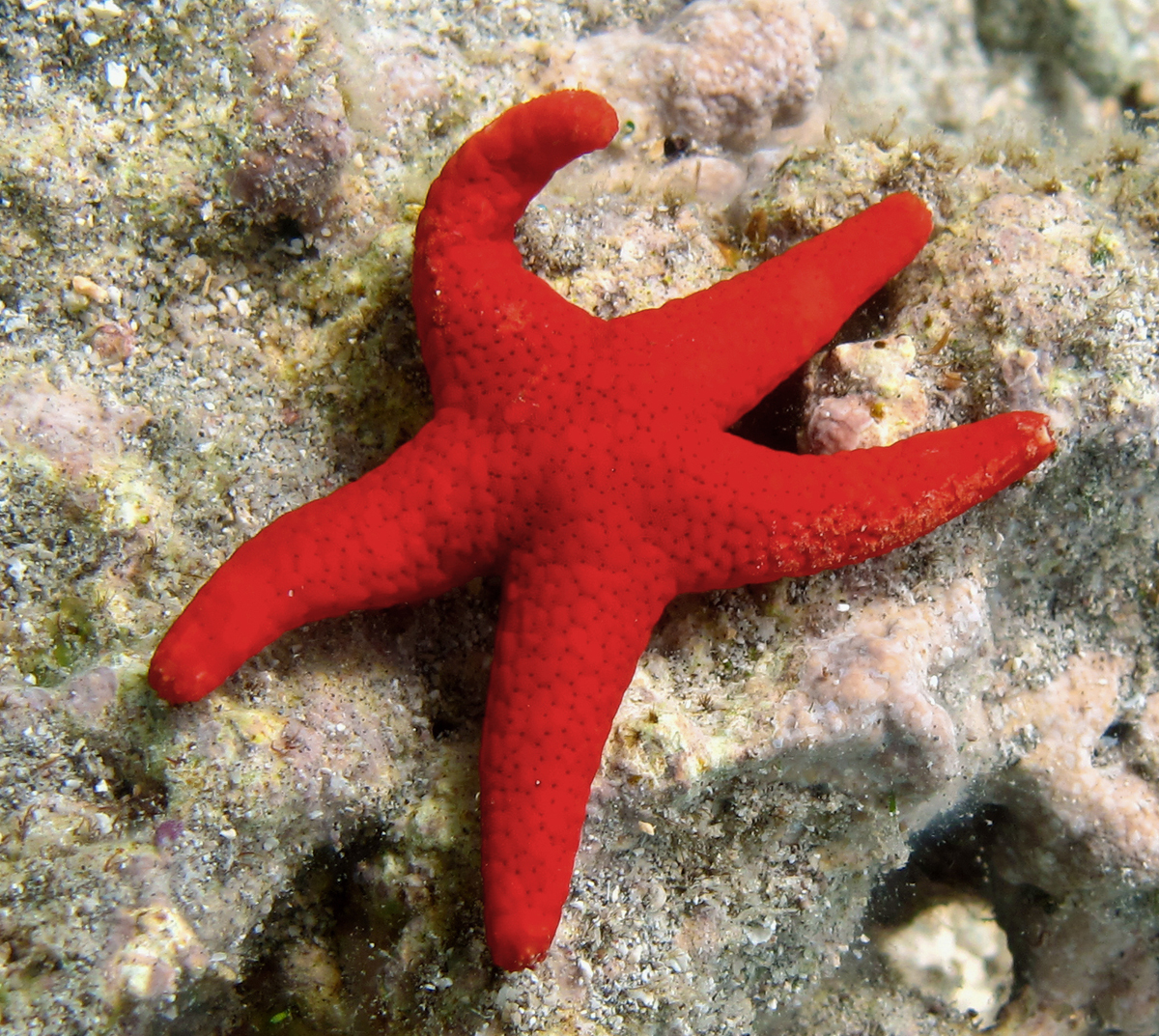

Scientific classification
- Kingdom: Animalia
- Phylum: Echinodermata
- Class: Asteroidea
- Order: Valvatida
- Family: Goniasteridae
- Genus: Fromia
- Species: F. milleporella

Binomial name
- Fromia milleporella (Lamarck, 1816)

Synonyms
- Asterias milleporella Lamarck, 1816; Fromia pistoria Muller and Troschel, 1842; Linckia milleporella Müller and Troschel, 1842; Linckia pistoria Muller and Troschel, 1842; Scytaster milleporellus Michelin, 1845; Scytaster pistorius Müller and Troschel, 1842

= Fromia milleporella =

Species of echinoderm

Fromia milleporella, common name red starfish or black spotted starfish, is a species of starfish belonging to the family Goniasteridae.

== Description ==
Fromia milleporella can reach a diameter of about 15 centimetres (5.9 in). Red seastars may have various shades of red.

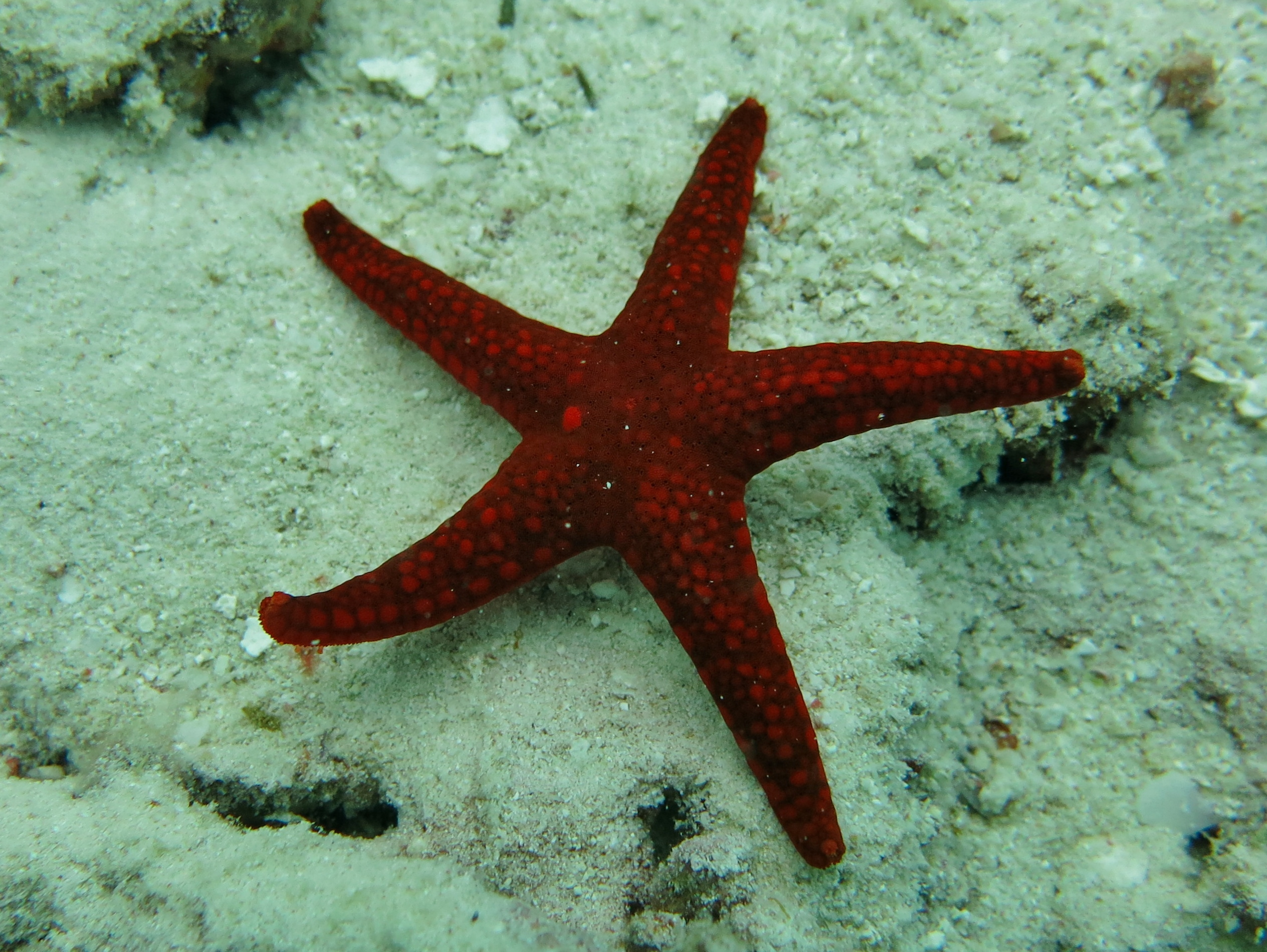
Fromia milleporella

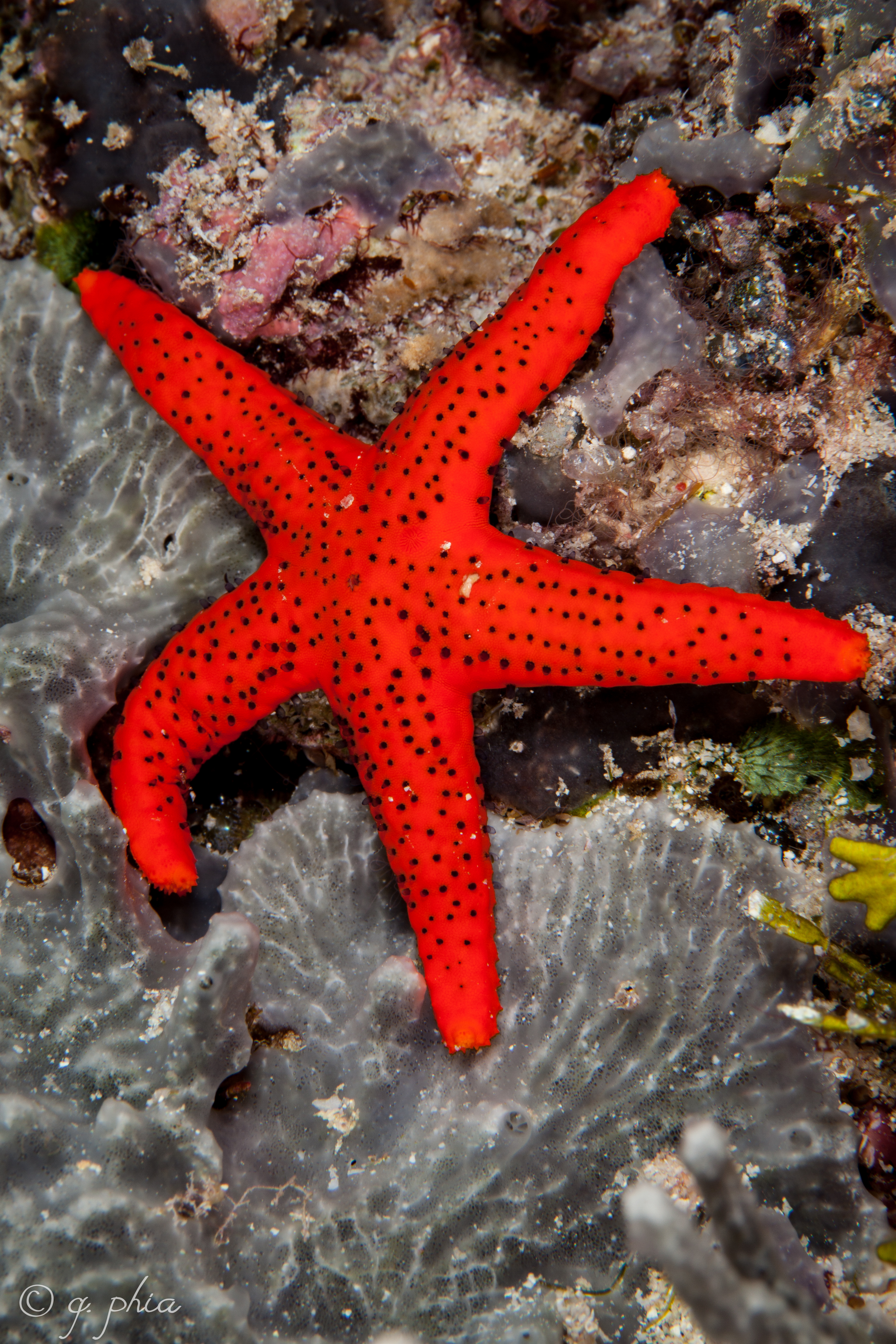
Fromia milleporella at Wakatobi National Park, 2018

== Distribution ==
This species can be found in the Indo-West Pacific starting as far south as Madagascar and to as far north as the Red Sea, as well as the Maldives area, Sri Lanka, Bay of Bengal, East Indies, north Australia, Philippines, China, south Japan and the South Pacific.

== Habitat ==
It lives at depths of 0 – 73 m.

== Nutrition and management of the aquarium ==
The species is also considered in reef aquariums. It feeds on a thin layers of algae, and so it can live only in an old well-established aquarium. Little can be done to supplement its diet. The red seastar is known to be very intolerant of sudden changes in water chemistry.
