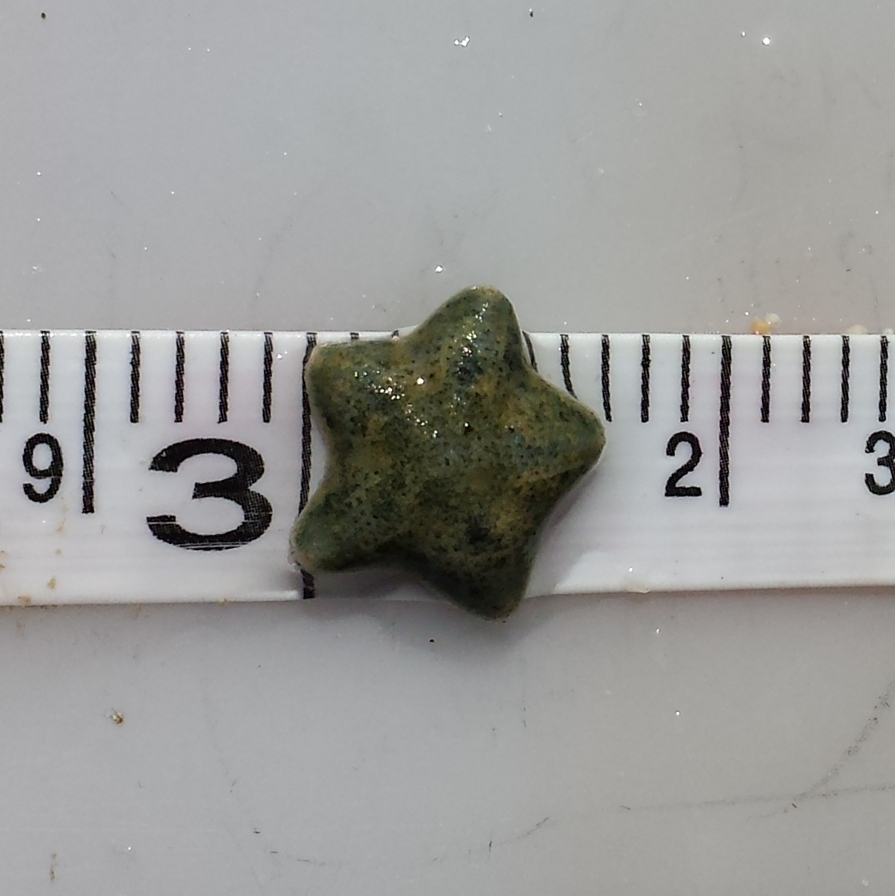
- Cryptasterina hystera

Scientific classification
- Domain: Eukaryota
- Kingdom: Animalia
- Phylum: Echinodermata
- Class: Asteroidea
- Order: Valvatida
- Family: Asterinidae
- Genus: Cryptasterina
- Species: C. hystera

Binomial name
- Cryptasterina hystera Dartnall & Byrne, 2003

= Cryptasterina hystera =

Species of starfish

Cryptasterina hystera is a species of starfish. It is found in a limited region of the coast of Australia and is very similar in appearance to Cryptasterina pentagona. The two appear to have diverged from a common ancestral line a few thousand years ago.

== Distribution ==
Cryptasterina hystera is native to a small number of locations on the coasts of Australia at the southern end of the range of Cryptasterina pentagona. It occurs around the shores and islands of Statue Bay (23°15′S; 150°45′E), in south east Queensland, and is typically found under rocks and among mangroves in the upper intertidal zone.

== Biology ==
Cryptasterina hystera is a hermaphrodite; the gonads can produce both sperm and eggs and are known as ovotestes. Fertilization of the eggs take place when sperm liberated by another starfish is drawn into the gonad through the gonoduct. The eggs are few in number and have large yolks and are retained inside the starfish which is viviparous. The brachiolaria larvae that develop inside the gonads "swim" in the fluid there and are eventually released into the sea through the gonopore as juvenile starfish.

Members of the family Asterinidae appear prone to rapid change in their reproductive life cycle and Cryptasterina hystera is one of several species that has recently diverged from its ancestral line. It has recently been recognised as a separate species from Cryptasterina pentagona, a morphologically similar species but with a different native range and a different method of reproduction.

In a research study, embryos were removed from the gonads of Cryptasterina hystera and reared in the laboratory. It was found that the larvae developed normally and exhibited similar behaviour to that of the larvae of free-spawning starfish. After about sixteen days they sank to the bottom and underwent metamorphosis into juveniles in a normal manner.
