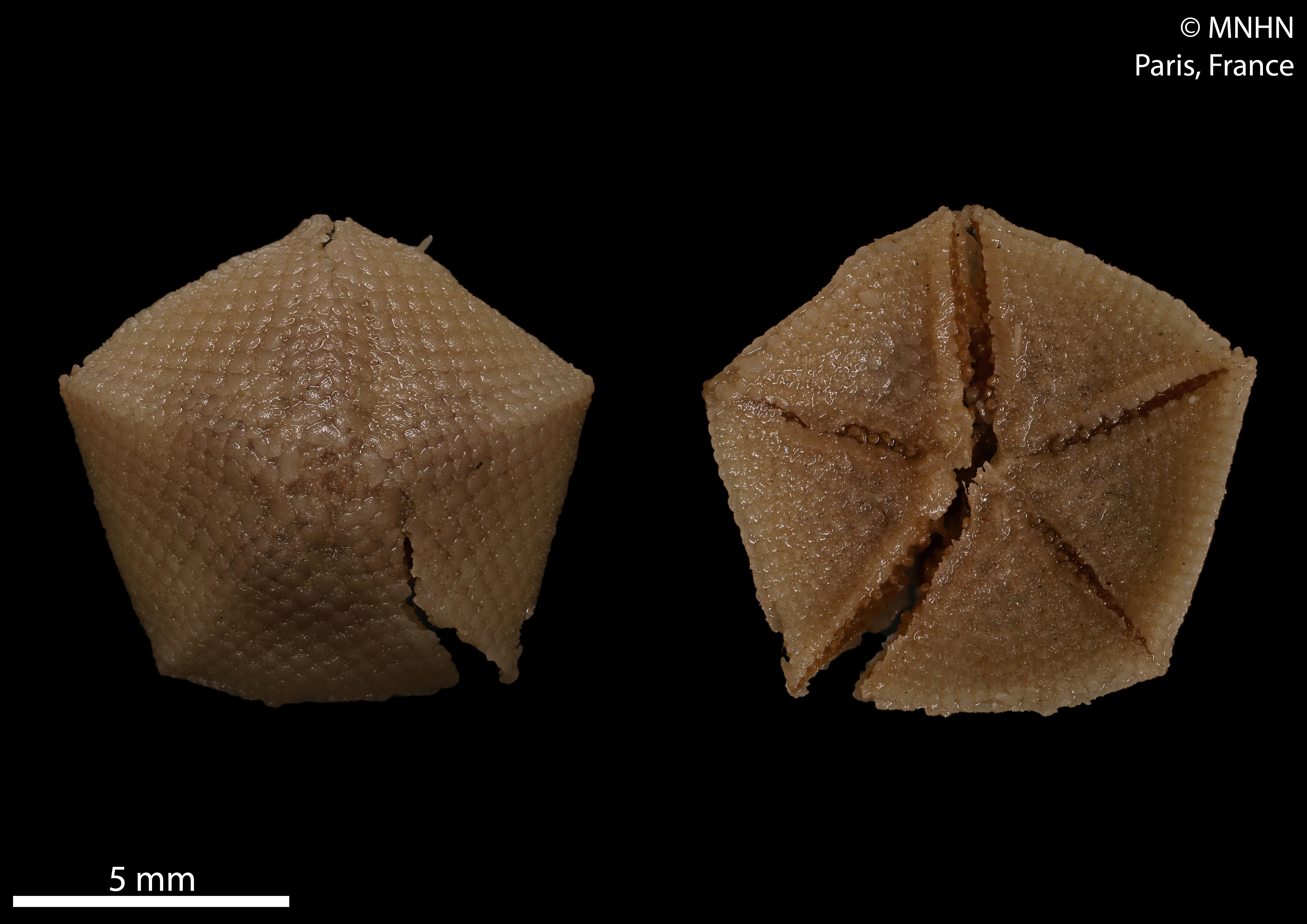

Scientific classification
- Kingdom: Animalia
- Phylum: Echinodermata
- Class: Asteroidea
- Order: Valvatida
- Family: Asterinidae
- Genus: Stegnaster
- Species: S. wesseli

Binomial name
- Stegnaster wesseli Perrier, 1875

= Stegnaster wesseli =

Species of starfish

Stegnaster wesseli is a sea star of the family Echinasteridae, found around the Bahamas and in the Caribbean, from Florida to the Yucatan including the Gulf of Mexico.
