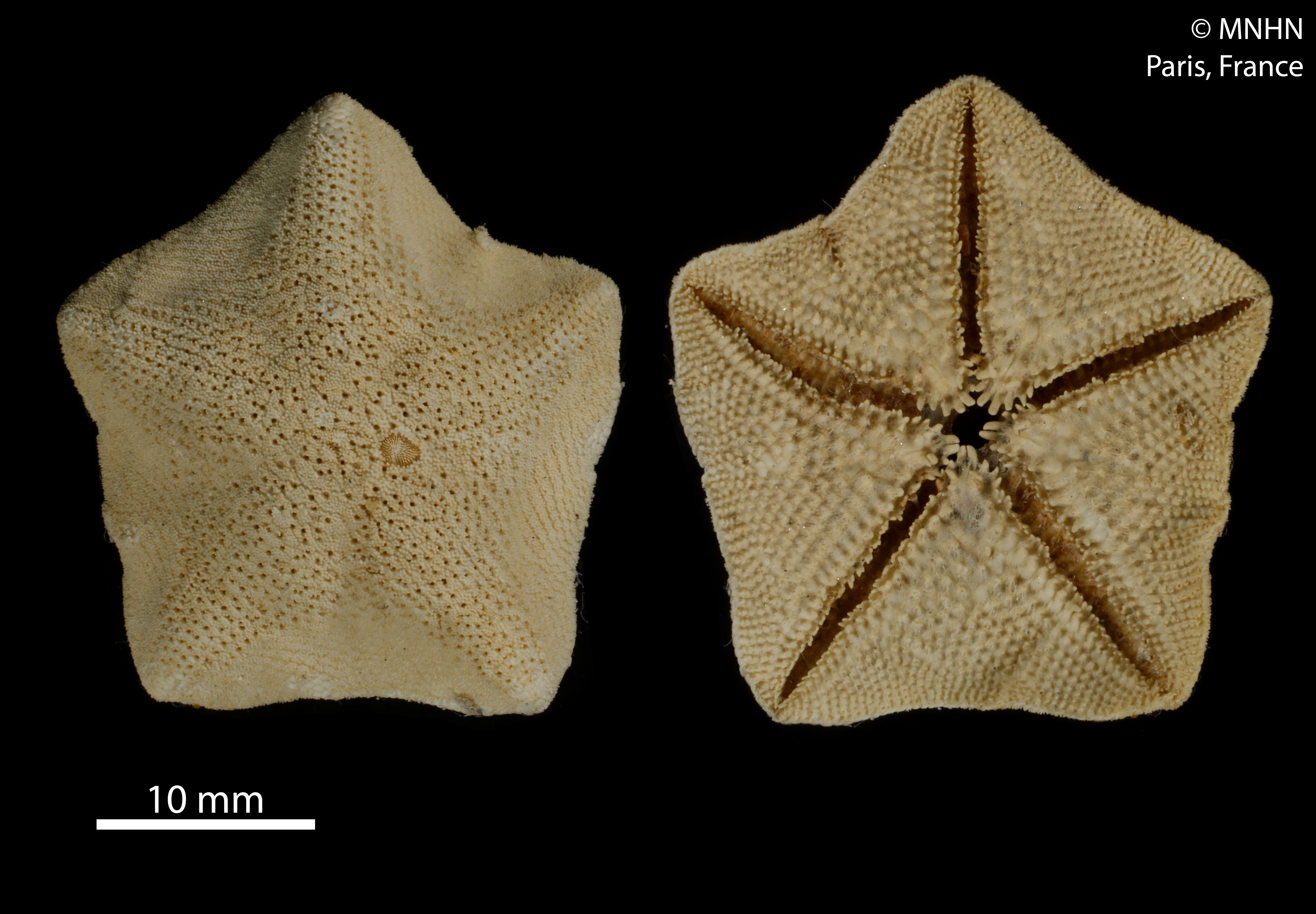

Scientific classification
- Kingdom: Animalia
- Phylum: Echinodermata
- Class: Asteroidea
- Order: Valvatida
- Family: Asterinidae
- Genus: Cryptasterina
- Species: C. pentagona

Binomial name
- Cryptasterina pentagona (Müller & Troschel, 1842)

Synonyms
- Patiriella pseudoexigua Dartnall, 1971

= Cryptasterina pentagona =

Species of starfish

Cryptasterina pentagona is a species of starfish in the family Asterinidae. It is found in shallow waters in north eastern Australia. Its life cycle includes the release of large-yolked eggs and the development of planktonic larvae which is in contrast to the very similar Cryptasterina hystera which is viviparous. The two appear to have diverged from a common ancestral line only a few thousand years ago.

== Description ==
As its name suggests, Cryptasterina pentagona is pentagonal, with five short rays with rounded tips. The body is covered by an integument and the plates (ossicles) are arranged in a longitudinal series along the rays. There are papulae in a row along the edge of the rays and scattered over the aboral (upper) surface, which is covered by spiky granulations. There are no pedicellariae. The oral (lower) surface is flat while the aboral surface forms a low dome.

== Distribution and habitat ==
Cryptasterina pentagona is native to the tropical Indo-Pacific regions of Indonesia, the Philippines, the Solomon Islands, Taiwan, Japan and the northeast coast of Queensland, Australia. It occurs in the littoral and shallow neritic zone. Its range in Australia extends from Mission Beach to Airlie Beach. It has been reported further south than Airlie Beach, but this may have been a misidentification where it was mistaken for its close relation Cryptasterina hystera. This, although morphologically very similar, has been shown to be a separate species by examination of molecular data. In Australia, Cryptasterina pentagona can be found on the shore of the upper intertidal zone under rocks.

== Biology ==
The sexes are separate in Cryptasterina pentagona, and it has the typical life cycle of a broadcast spawner. This involves the release by the female of buoyant, golden, yolky eggs, which are fertilised externally, and the development of brachiolaria larvae. At first these rise to the surface but as they further develop, they sink to the seabed. Here they explore the surface with their rays before deciding on a suitable spot for metamorphosis. Now about nine days old, they attach themselves to the substrate with an adhesive disc. After a complex rearrangement of tissues during metamorphosis, they detach themselves and crawl away as miniature, five-rayed starfish. These new juveniles have two pairs of tube feet on each ray and are an amber colour, indicating that they still have yolk reserves on which to feed. Their mouths do not open for a further three weeks and by that time they have used up the maternal food reserves and the colour has gone.
