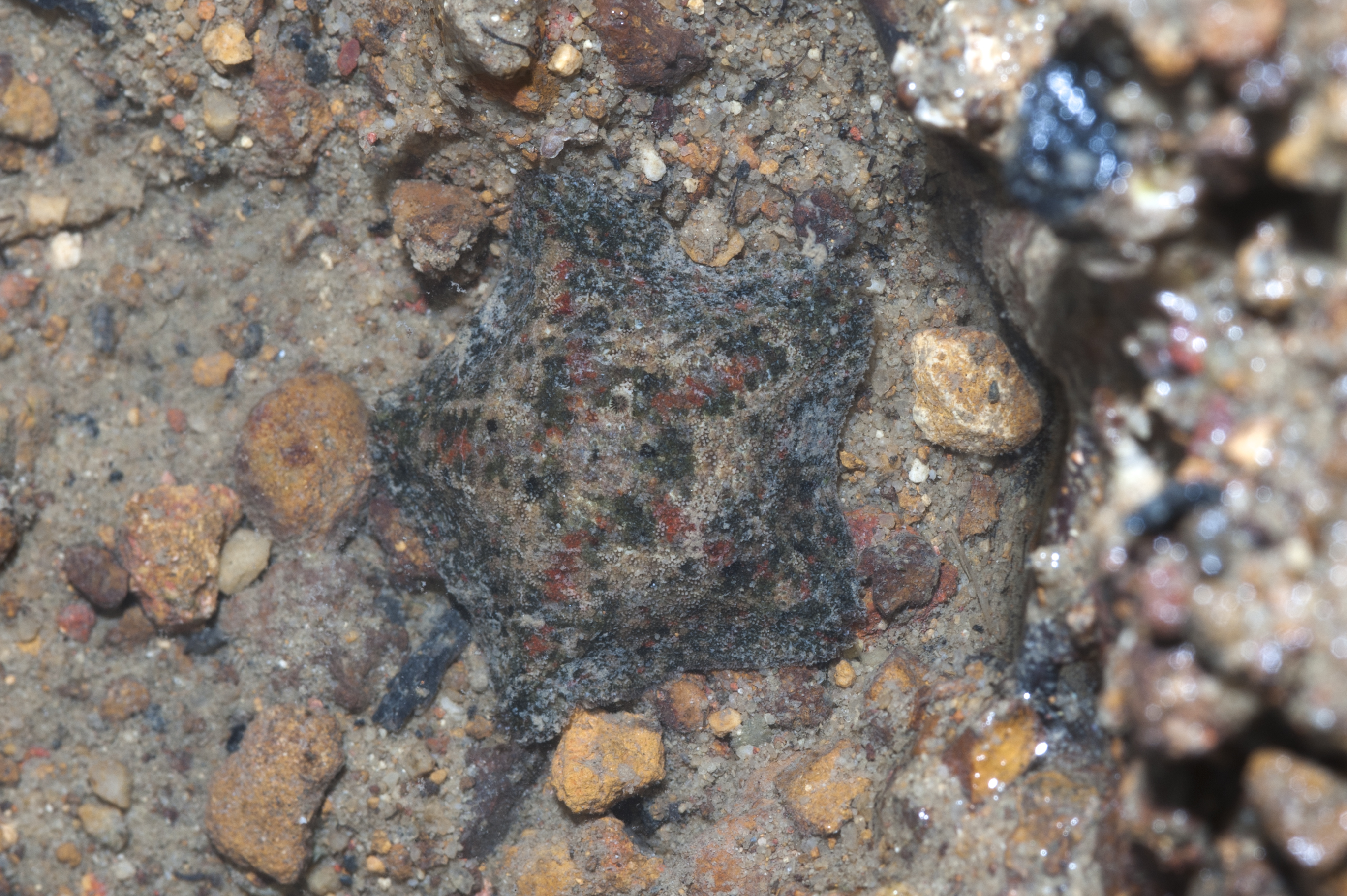
- Cryptasterina sp.

Scientific classification
- Kingdom: Animalia
- Phylum: Echinodermata
- Class: Asteroidea
- Order: Valvatida
- Family: Asterinidae
- Genus: Cryptasterina; Dartnall, Byrne, Collins & Hart, 2003

= Cryptasterina =

Genus of star fish

Cryptasterina is a genus of starfish belonging to the family Asterinidae. They occur in the Indian and Western Pacific Oceans in the littoral and shallow sublittoral zone.

== Description ==
Cryptasterina are small sea stars, with the radius between 12 and 17 mm (0.47 and 0.67 in). The genus shows both viviparity and oviparity. The latter is the ancestral mode of reproduction.

== Species ==
There are three species:

- Cryptasterina hystera Dartnall & Byrne, 2003 in Dartnall, Byrne, Collins & Hart, 2003
- Cryptasterina pacifica (Hayashi, 1977)
- Cryptasterina pentagona (Muller & Troschel, 1840)
