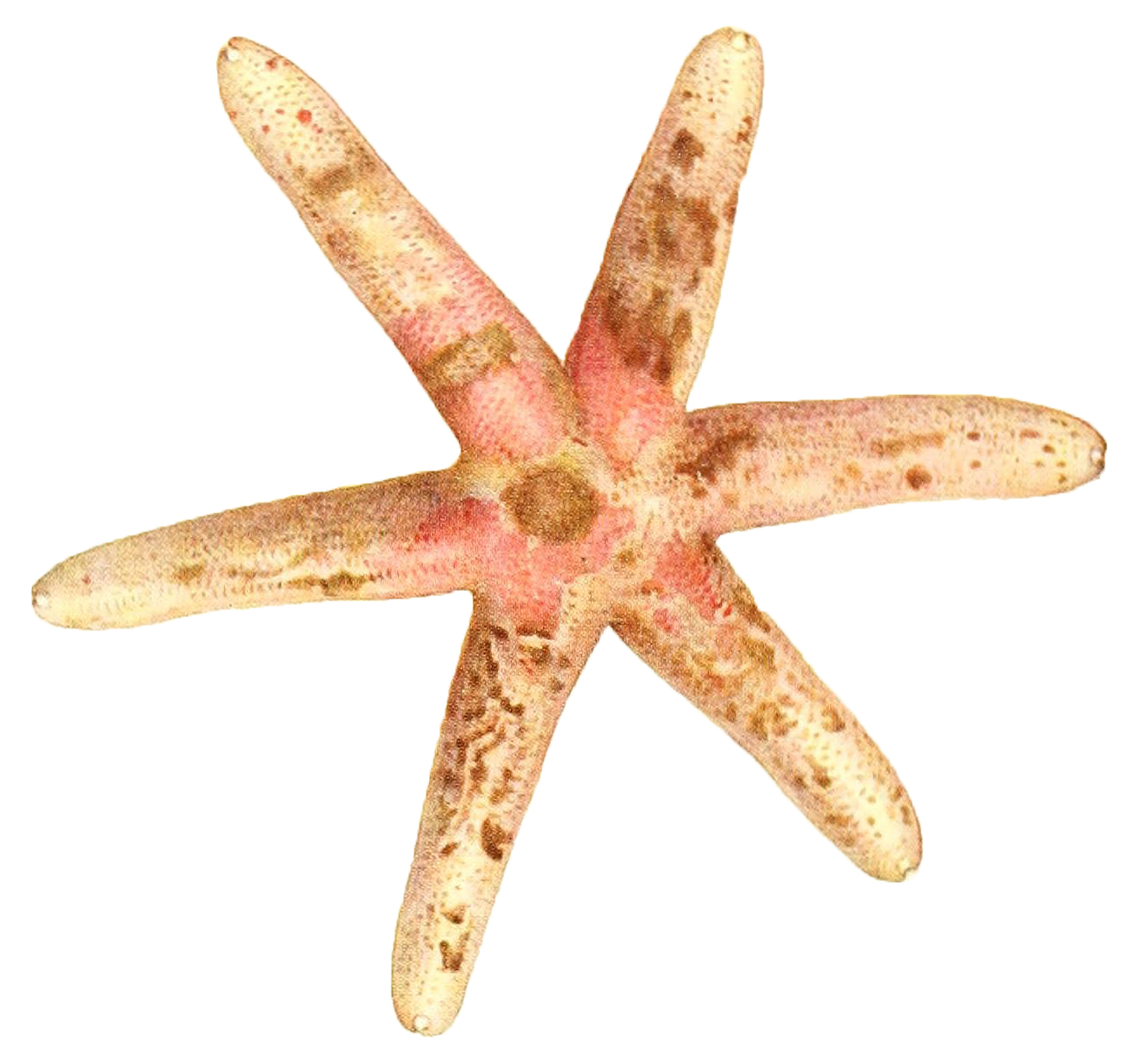

Scientific classification
- Kingdom: Animalia
- Phylum: Echinodermata
- Class: Asteroidea
- Order: Valvatida
- Family: Asterinidae
- Genus: Nepanthia
- Species: N. belcheri

Binomial name
- Nepanthia belcheri (Perrier, 1875)

Synonyms
- Asterina belcheri Perrier, 1875; Asterina brevis Perrier, 1875; Echinaster heteractis (H.L. Clark, 1909); Henricia heteractis H.L. Clark, 1909; Henricides heteractis (H.L. Clark, 1909); Nepanthia brevis (Perrier, 1875); Nepanthia joubini Koehler, 1908; Nepanthia magnispina H.L. Clark, 1938; Nepanthia polyplax Doderlein, 1926; Nepanthia suffarcinata Sladen, 1889; Nepanthia variabilis H.L. Clark, 1938; Patiria crassa Bell, 1884

= Nepanthia belcheri =

Species of starfish

Nepanthia belcheri is a species of starfish in the family Asterinidae. It is found in shallow water in Southeast Asia and northeastern Australia. It is an unusual species in that it can reproduce sexually or can split in two by fission to form two new individuals. As a result, it has varying numbers of arms, and Hubert Lyman Clark, writing in 1938, stated, "It is a literal truth that no two of the 56 specimens at hand, nearly all from Lord Howe Island, are exactly alike in number, size and form of arms".

== Description ==
Nepanthia belcheri is a small starfish with broad arms with rounded tips. Small specimens tend to have five arms, while larger ones have six or seven, although the number of arms can range from one or two to 10. When 12 months old, the length of an arm is typically 11 mm (0.4 in), after two years it is 18 mm (0.7 in), in the third year it reaches 23 mm (0.9 in) and in the fourth 27 mm (1.1 in). N. belcheri is a muddy brown colour.

== Distribution ==
Nepanthia belcheri is native to the Pacific coast of Australia from the Low Islands in Queensland to Port Jackson in New South Wales. It also occurs in Southeast Asia and is found under boulders and rubble where conditions are muddy, from the intertidal zone down to a depth of about 45 m (150 ft).

== Biology ==
Nepanthia belcheri is a hermaphrodite and can reproduce both sexually and asexually. The gonads generally produce oocytes, but in some, no spermatogenic material is present, so they function as ovaries, while others produce sperm and function as testes. Sexual reproduction takes place in October and November. The eggs have large yolk sacs so the larvae are probably lechithotrophic, living on the nutrients already present in the eggs. Reproducing sexually allows the species to disperse to new locations in a way it could not do if it relied entirely on asexual reproduction. The lifespan is at least four years.

During its second and third years, when it is actively growing and its arm length is either about 15 or 22 mm, N. belcheri can reproduce by fragmentation. A furrow appears on the disc which gradually deepens, and the two sides of the starfish pull away from each other. The disc is torn into two portions and over time, new arms grow on each section. As a result, the new individuals are asymmetric and often have six or seven arms of varying lengths. The original arms grow more slowly than the new ones so that, by the time the arm length reaches 27 mm, all the arms are much the same length. After fission, the gonads regress and individuals that previously had mature female gonads become masculinized, developing male-type gonads. Many larger individuals provide evidence from the varying lengths of their arms that they have divided by fission on several occasions.
