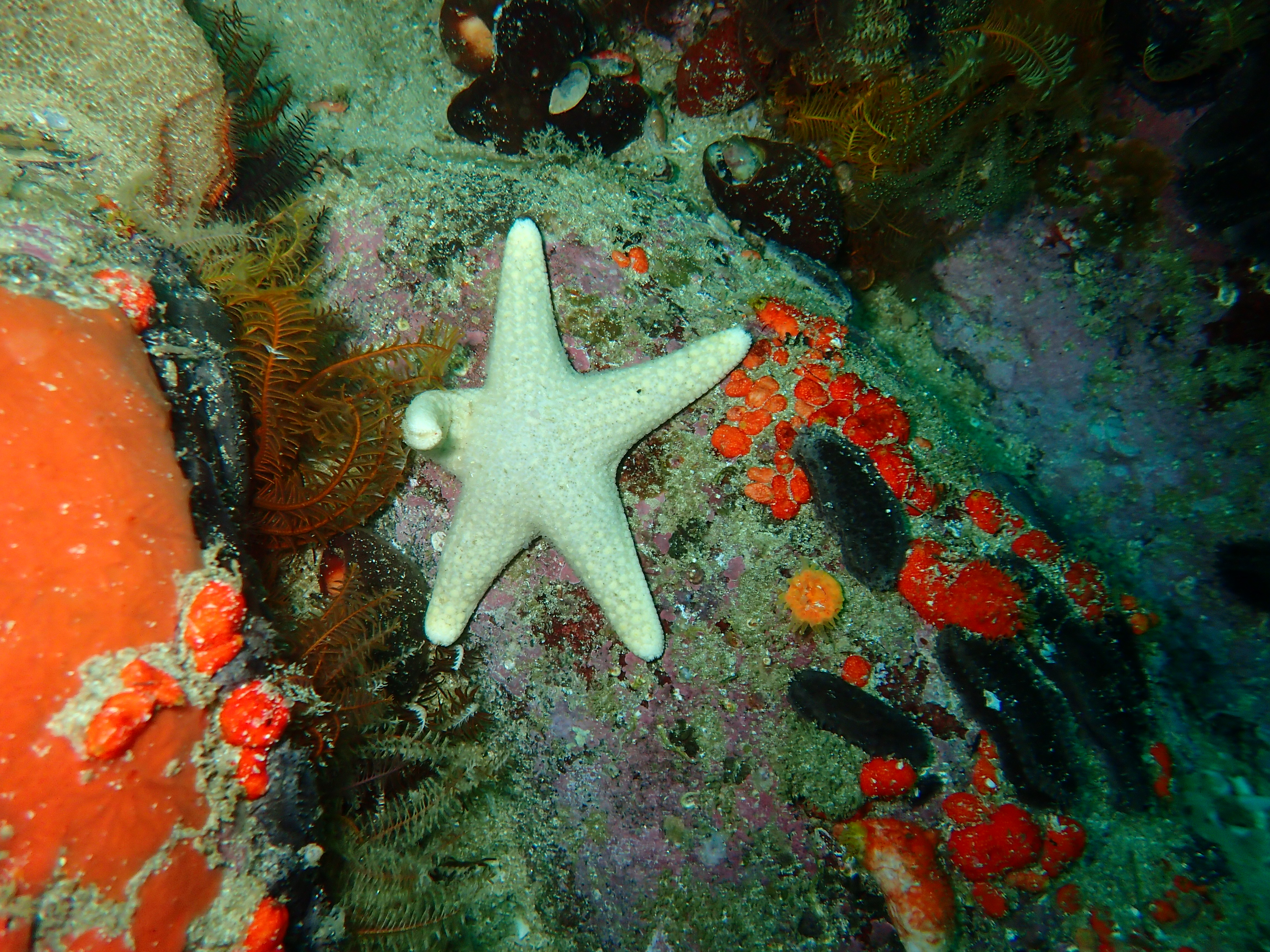
- Callopatiria formosa found at Murphy's reef, Miller's Point, Cape Peninsula

Scientific classification
- Kingdom: Animalia
- Phylum: Echinodermata
- Class: Asteroidea
- Order: Valvatida
- Family: Asterinidae
- Genus: Callopatiria
- Species: C. formosa

Binomial name
- Callopatiria formosa (Mortensen, 1933)

Synonyms
- Parasterina formosa Mortensen, 1933: Patiria formosa (Mortensen, 1933) (Subsequent combination by Clark (1956))

= Callopatiria formosa =

Grey starfish, Beautiful starfish

Species of starfish found in South Africa

Callopatiria formosa, the grey starfish or beautiful starfish, is an echinoderm in the family Asterinidae found in South Africa.

Originally described as Parasterina formosa by T. Mortensen, in Echinoderms of South Africa (Asteroidea and Ophiuroidea), 1933.
