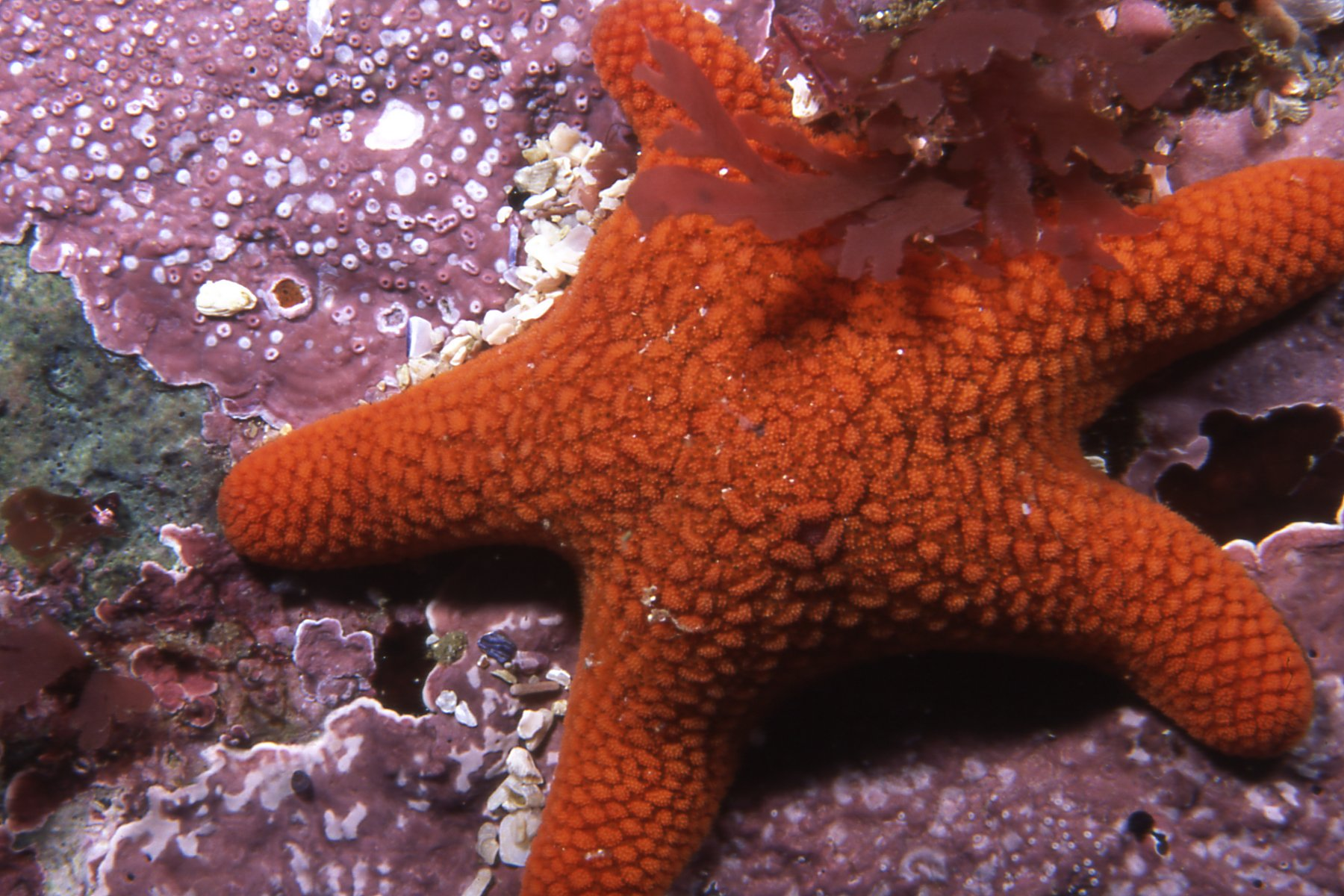
- Callopatiria granifera

Scientific classification
- Kingdom: Animalia
- Phylum: Echinodermata
- Class: Asteroidea
- Order: Valvatida
- Family: Asterinidae
- Genus: Callopatiria; Verrill, 1913

Species
- 3 species (see text)

= Callopatiria =

Genus of starfish

Callopatiria is a genus of starfish of the family Asterinidae. The genus is found in shallow waters off South Africa, down to a depth of about 82 m (269 ft).

== Characteristics ==
Members of the genus Callopatiria have five long, narrow rays, rounded on the upper surface and tapering to a rounded tip. They are medium-sized, reaching a radius of 60 mm (2.4 in) in Callopatiria granifera. The body is flat on the oral (under) surface but convex on the aboral (upper) surface. The plates on the rays are irregular and are covered by numerous glassy spinelets, finger-like on the primary plates and narrowly conical on the secondary plates. No pedicellariae are present and the papular spaces are large with numerous papulae.

== Species ==
There are three recognized species:

- Callopatiria cabrinovici O'Loughlin, 2009
- Callopatiria formosa (Mortensen, 1933)
- Callopatiria granifera (Gray, 1847)
