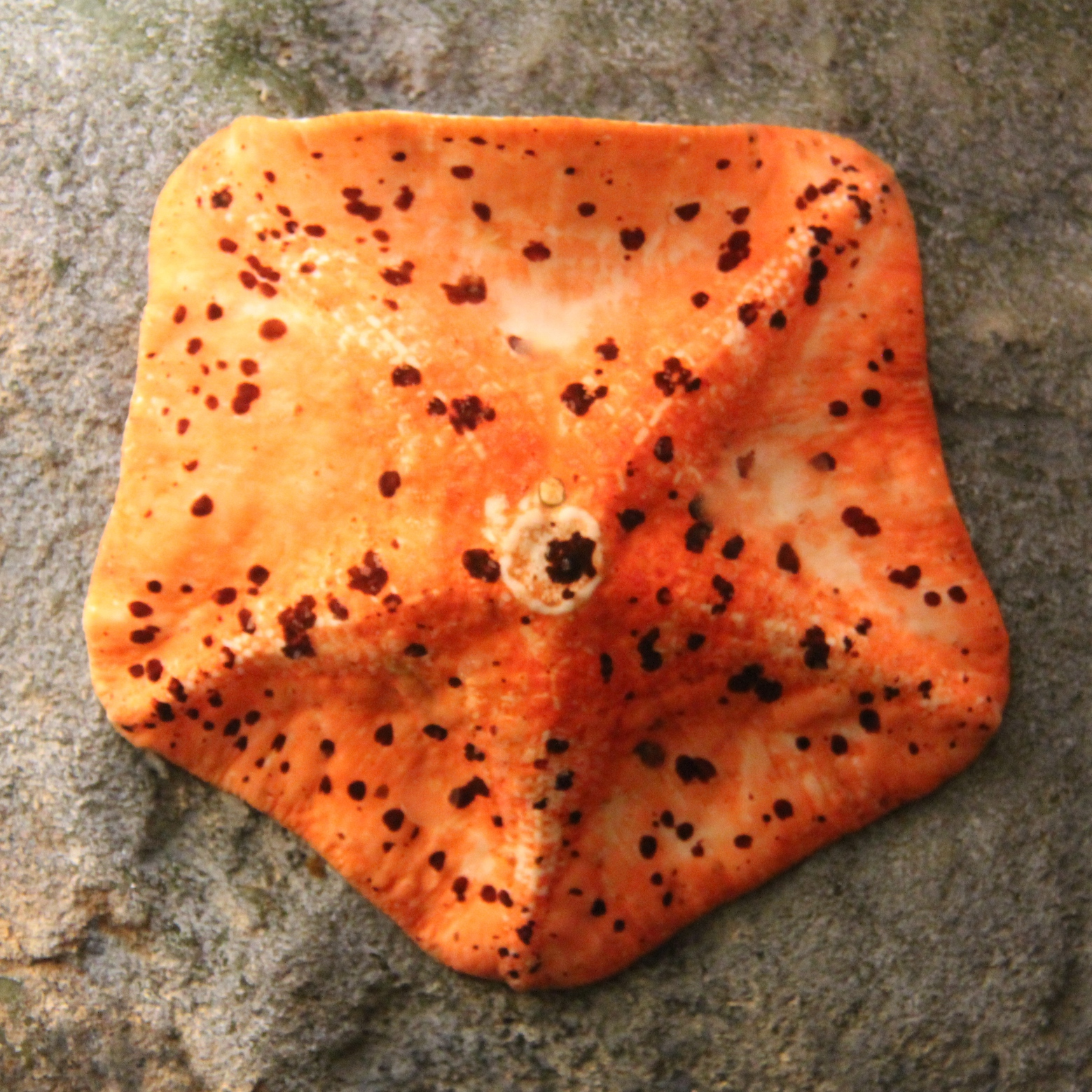
- Stegnaster inflatus

Scientific classification
- Kingdom: Animalia
- Phylum: Echinodermata
- Class: Asteroidea
- Order: Valvatida
- Family: Asterinidae
- Genus: Stegnaster; Sladen, 1889

Species
- See text.

= Stegnaster =

Genus of starfishes

Stegnaster is a genus of sea stars of the family Asterinidae, endemic to New Zealand. It contains two species:

== Species ==
- Stegnaster inflatus (Hutton, 1872)
- Stegnaster wesseli (Perrier, 1875)
