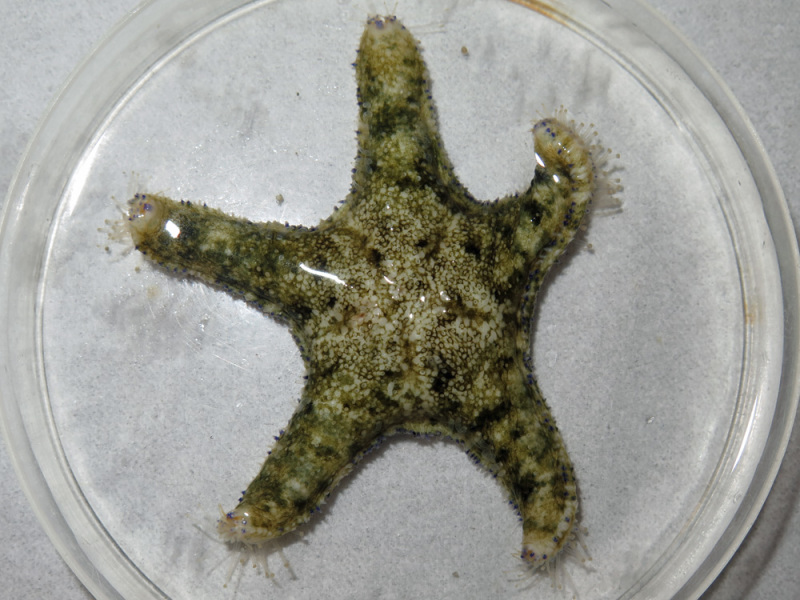
- Disasterina abnormalis

Scientific classification
- Kingdom: Animalia
- Phylum: Echinodermata
- Class: Asteroidea
- Order: Valvatida
- Family: Asterinidae
- Genus: Disasterina; Perrier, 1875

Type species
- Disasterina abnormalis Perrier, 1875

Species
- 6 species (see text)

Synonyms
- Habroporina H.L. Clark, 1921; Manasterina H.L. Clark, 1938

= Disasterina =

Genus of sea stars

Disasterina is a genus of sea stars of the family Asterinidae. The genus occurs in the Indian and western Pacific Oceans.

== Description and characteristics ==
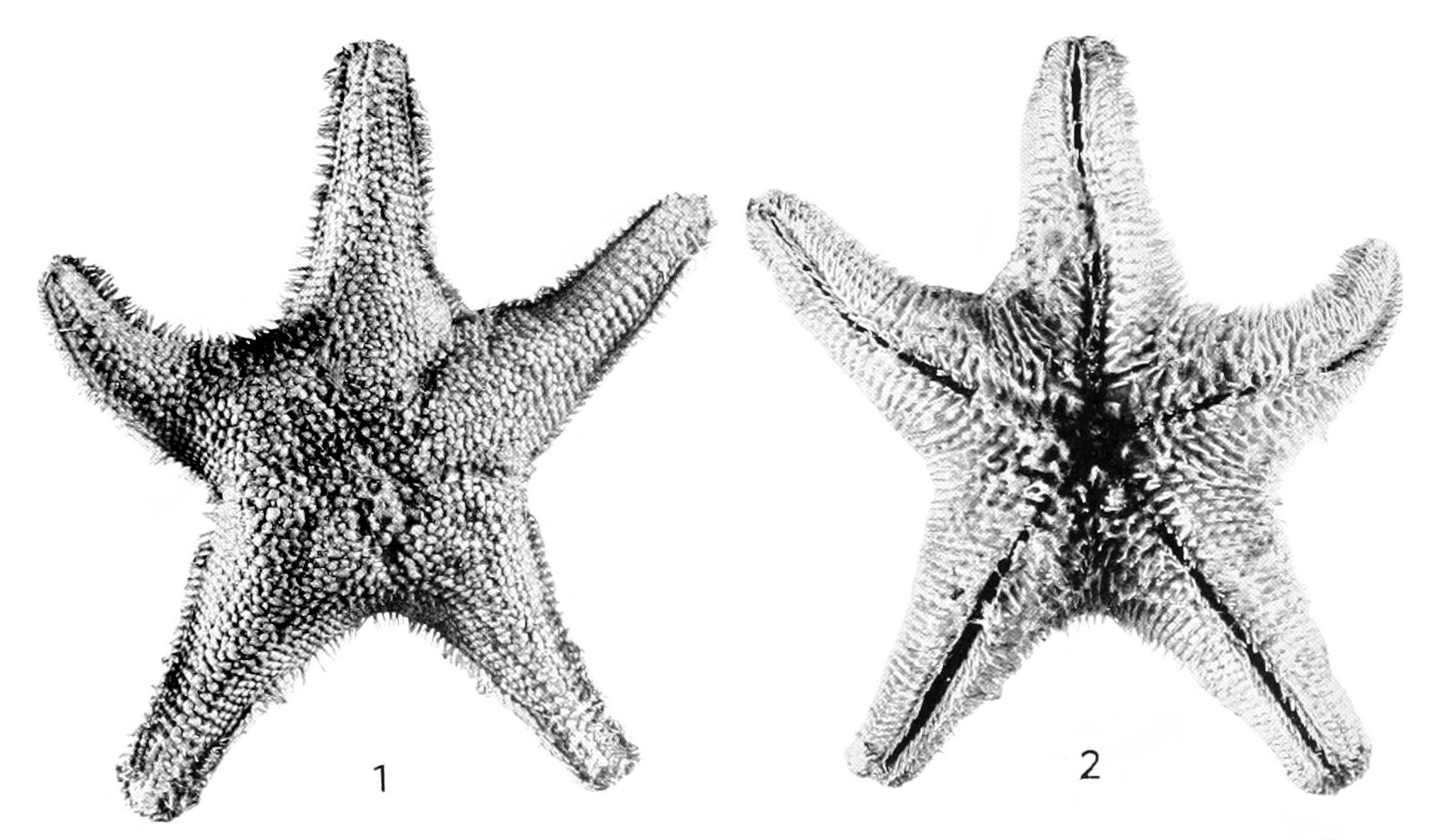
Disasterina longispina, dorsal and ventral view.

Disasterina are sea stars with five or rarely six rays (arms). The rays have wide bases and are well-defined. The body is thin. Disasterina range from small (D. spinosa: radius 14 mm (0.55 in)) to medium in size (D. abnormalis: radius 38 mm (1.5 in). Reproduction through fissiparity is not known to occur. D. longispina might have pedicellariae.

== Species ==
There are six recognized species:

- Disasterina abnormalis Perrier, 1875
- Disasterina akajimaensis Saba, Iwao & Fujita, 2012
- Disasterina ceylanica Döderlein, 1888
- Disasterina longispina (H.L. Clark, 1938)
- Disasterina odontacantha Liao, 1980
- Disasterina spinosa Koehler, 1910
