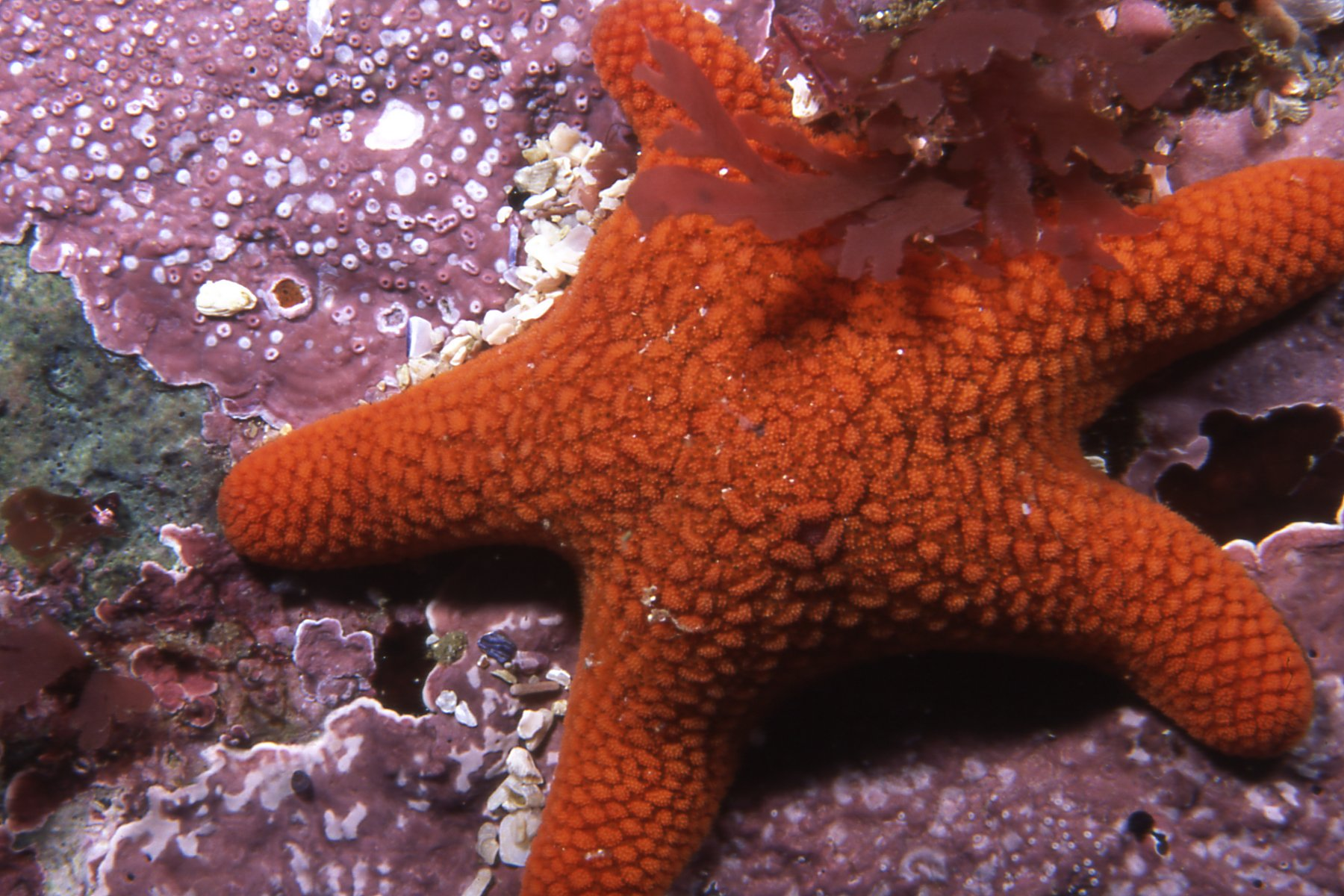
- Callopatiria granifera

Scientific classification
- Kingdom: Animalia
- Phylum: Echinodermata
- Class: Asteroidea
- Order: Valvatida
- Family: Asterinidae
- Genus: Callopatiria
- Species: C. granifera

Binomial name
- Callopatiria granifera (Gray, 1847)

= Callopatiria granifera =

Species of starfish

Callopatiria granifera, the red starfish, is a southern African species of starfish in the family Asterinidae.

== Description ==
The red starfish is a medium-sized orange to red starfish which grows up to 15 cm (5.9 in) across. It has a dorsal surface resembling a tiled roof and its arms taper to rounded ends.

== Distribution ==
It is found from Namibia to Durban on the South African coast, subtidally.

== Ecology ==
This starfish feeds on food detritus.
