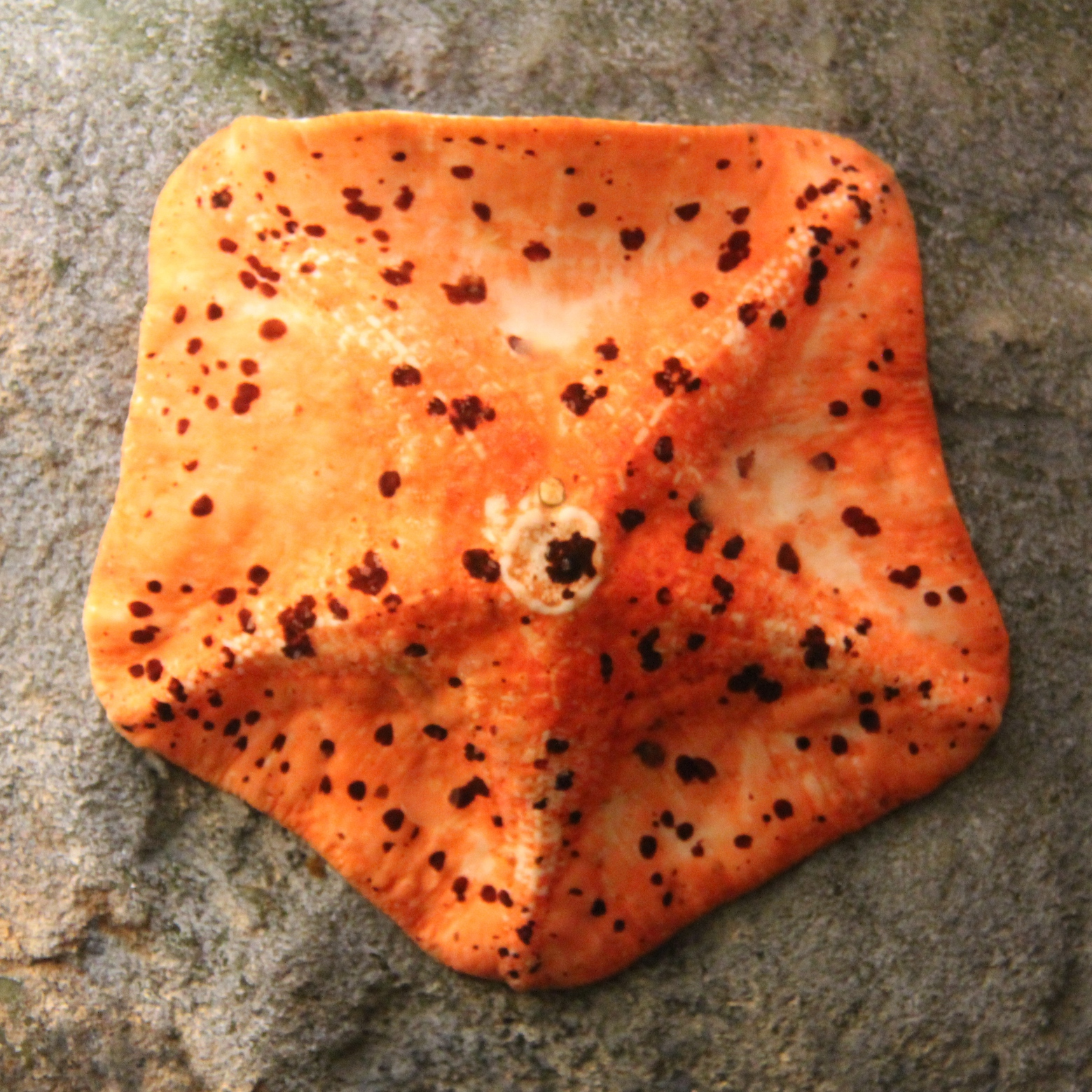

Scientific classification
- Kingdom: Animalia
- Phylum: Echinodermata
- Class: Asteroidea
- Order: Valvatida
- Family: Asterinidae
- Genus: Stegnaster
- Species: S. inflatus

Binomial name
- Stegnaster inflatus Hutton, 1872

= Stegnaster inflatus =

Species of starfish

Stegnaster inflatus is a sea star of the family Asterinidae, endemic to New Zealand.
