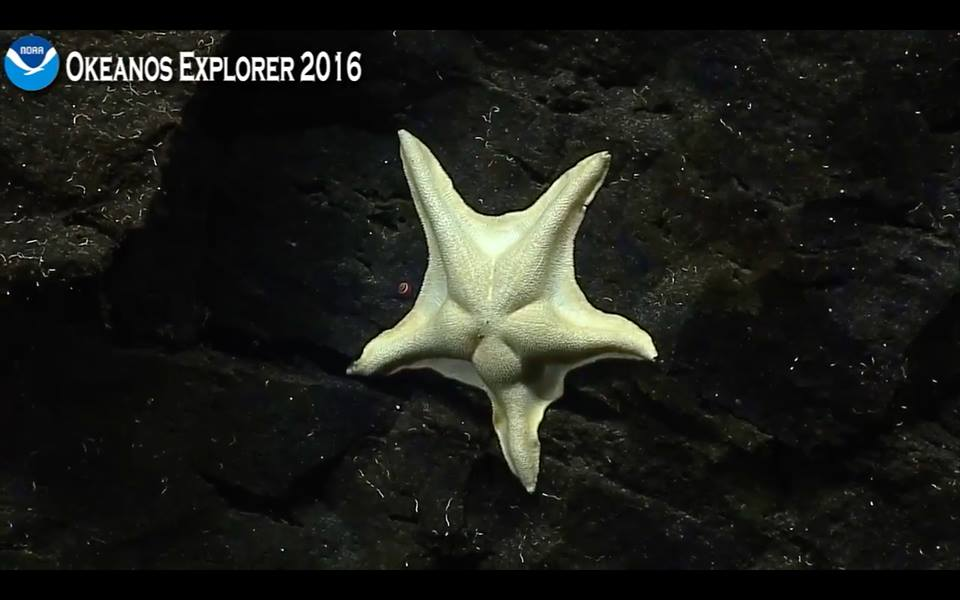

Scientific classification
- Kingdom: Animalia
- Phylum: Echinodermata
- Class: Asteroidea
- Order: Valvatida
- Family: Asterinidae
- Genus: Paranepanthia; Fisher, 1917

Species
- See text

= Paranepanthia =

Genus of starfishes

Paranepanthia is a genus of starfish of the family Asterinidae. Members of the genus have five rays and are found in the waters around Australia, Indonesia and Antarctic New Zealand.

== Characteristics ==
Members of the genus Paranepanthia are characterized by having five medium-length, broad-based rays that are narrowly flat on the oral (under) surface, with pointed or rounded ends. Pedicellariae are not present and the papular spaces are large with several small papulae. The marginal plates are in regular series, with tufts of short, needle-shaped spinelets, but the plates on the aboral (upper) surface are irregular. The type species is Nepanthia platydisca Fisher, 1913.

== Distribution ==
Members of the genus are found at depths down to about 377 m (1,237 ft) in Australia, Indonesia and Antarctic New Zealand.

== Species ==
The World Asteroidea Dartabase lists the following species:

- Paranepanthia aucklandensis (Koehler, 1920)
- Paranepanthia brachiata (Koehler, 1910)
- Paranepanthia grandis (H.L. Clark, 1928)
- Paranepanthia platydisca (Fisher, 1913)
- Paranepanthia praetermissa (Livingstone, 1933)
