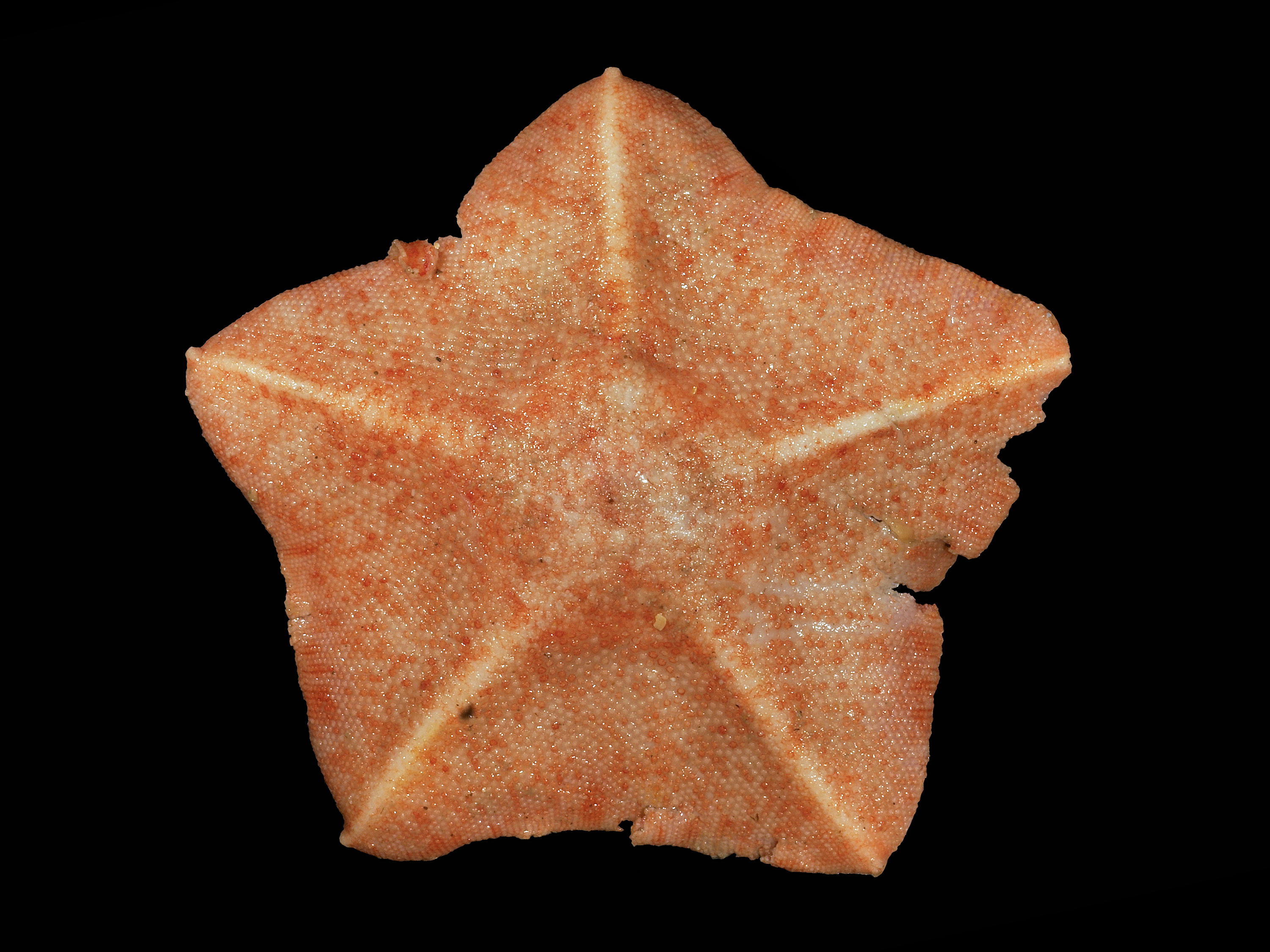

Scientific classification
- Kingdom: Animalia
- Phylum: Echinodermata
- Class: Asteroidea
- Order: Valvatida
- Family: Asterinidae
- Genus: Anseropoda
- Species: A. placenta

Binomial name
- Anseropoda placenta Pennant, 1777

Synonyms
- Anseropoda membranacea Nardo, 1834; Anseropoda membranacea (Retzius, 1783); Asterias cartilaginea Fleming, 1828; Asterias membranacea Retzius, 1783; Asterias palmipes Olivi, 1792; Asterias placenta Pennant, 1777; Asteriscus membranaceus (Retzius, 1783); Asteriscus palmipes Müller & Troschel, 1842; Asteriscus placenta (Pennant, 1777); Carna membranacea (Retzius, 1783); Palmipes membranaceus (Retzius, 1783)

= Anseropoda placenta =

Species of sea star

Anseropoda placenta, also called the goose foot starfish, is a species of sea star in the family Asterinidae.

== Description ==
Anseropoda placenta is up to 20 cm (7.9 in) in diameter. It's a very thin, leaflike, flat sea star with short webbed arms. Its specific name placenta refers to a kind of flat cake. The aboral surface (top) has a texture of small plates; it is white with five radiating red lines, one down the centre of each arm.

== Distribution ==
Most common in the Irish Sea and English Channel, and is more rarely found off Scotland. It is in rapid decline in Northern Ireland due to bottom fishing.

== Environment ==
Anseropoda placenta is sublittoral, typically living at 20–40 m (66–131 ft) depth, in muddy sand or muddy gravel; it has been found as deep as 500 m (1,600 ft).

== Behaviour ==
Anseropoda placenta produces large eggs in the summer. It feeds on benthic molluscs, crustaceans and echinoderms.

== Gallery ==
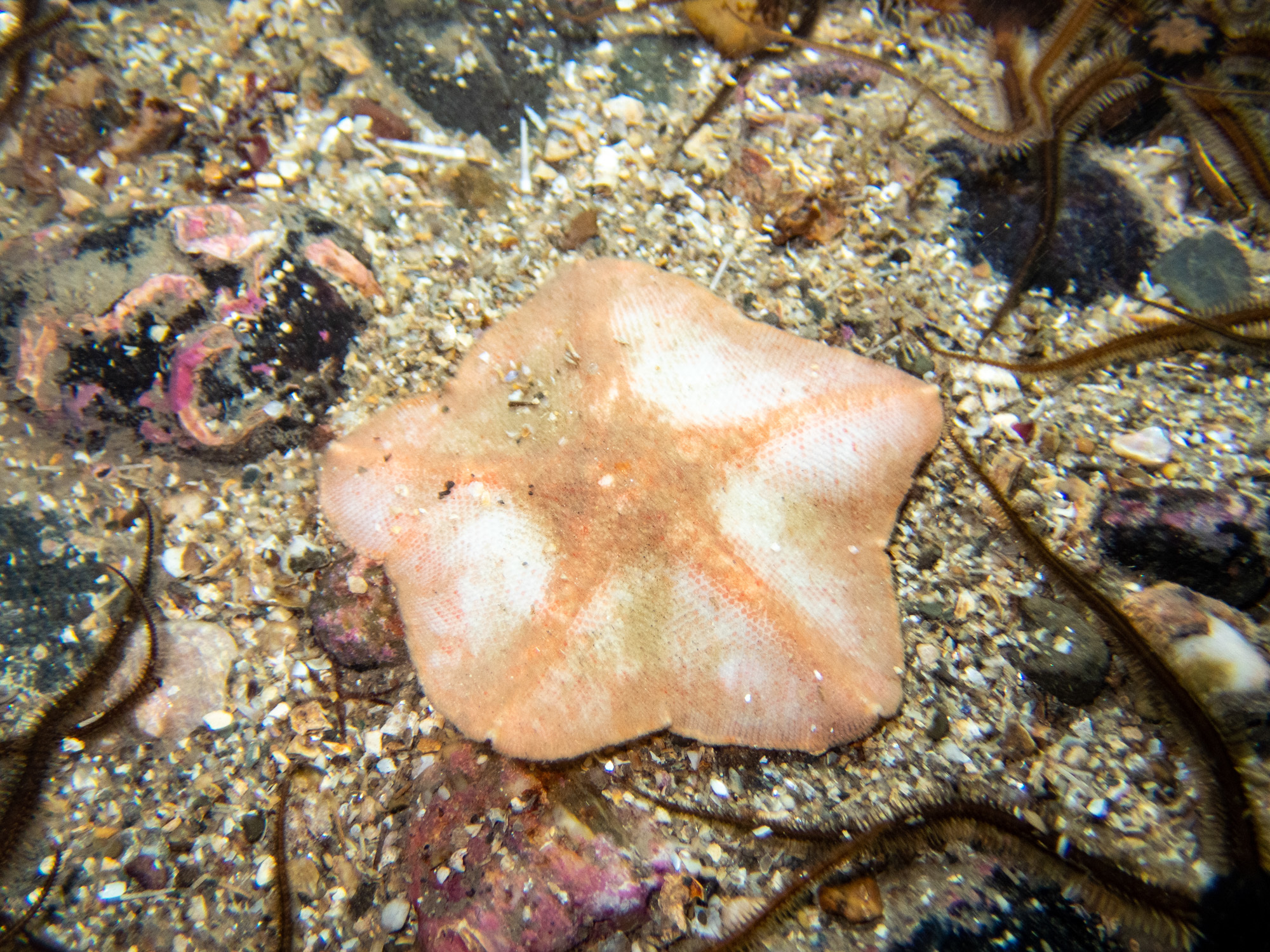
Aboral (upper) surface

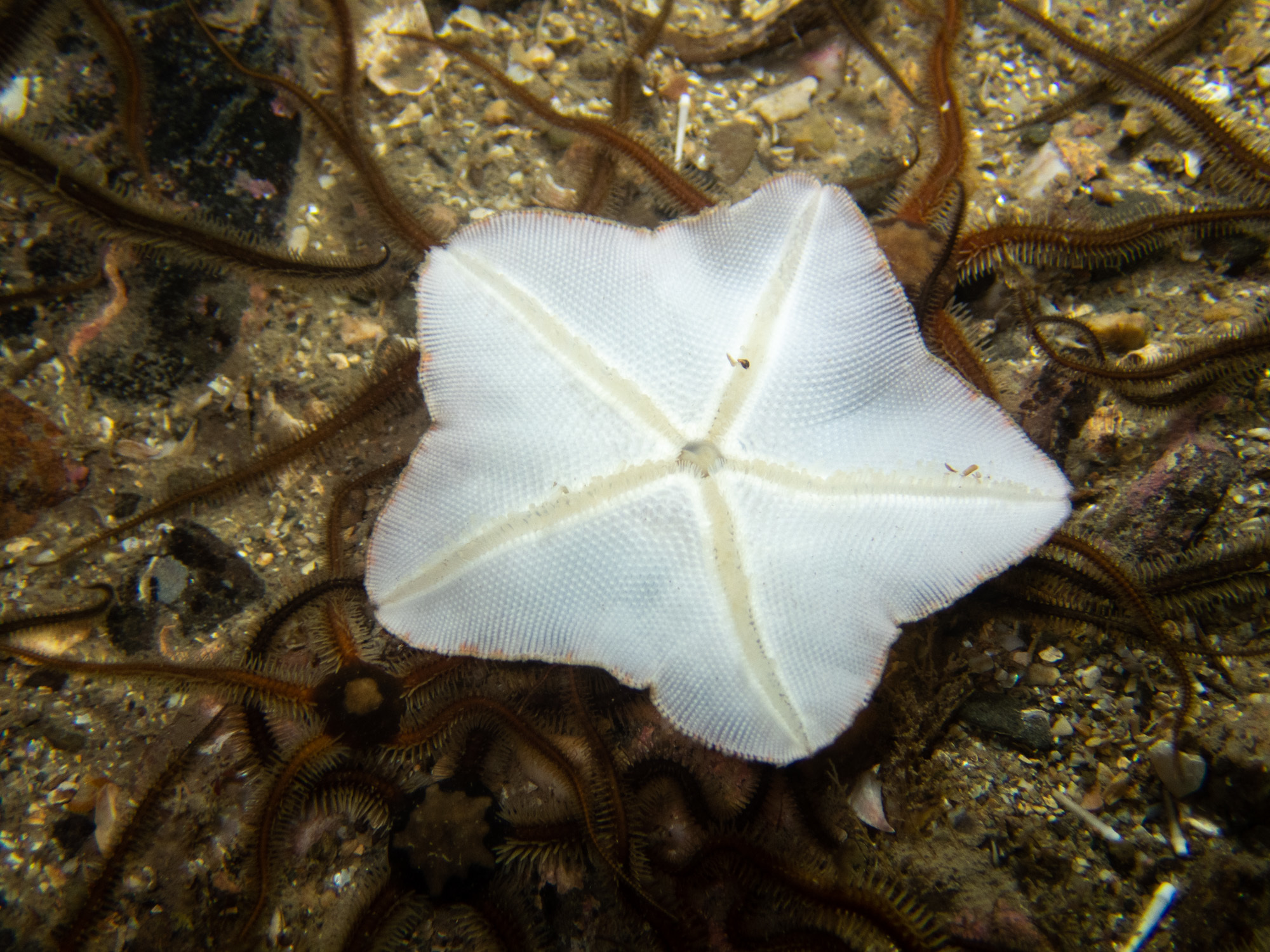
Oral surface (underside)

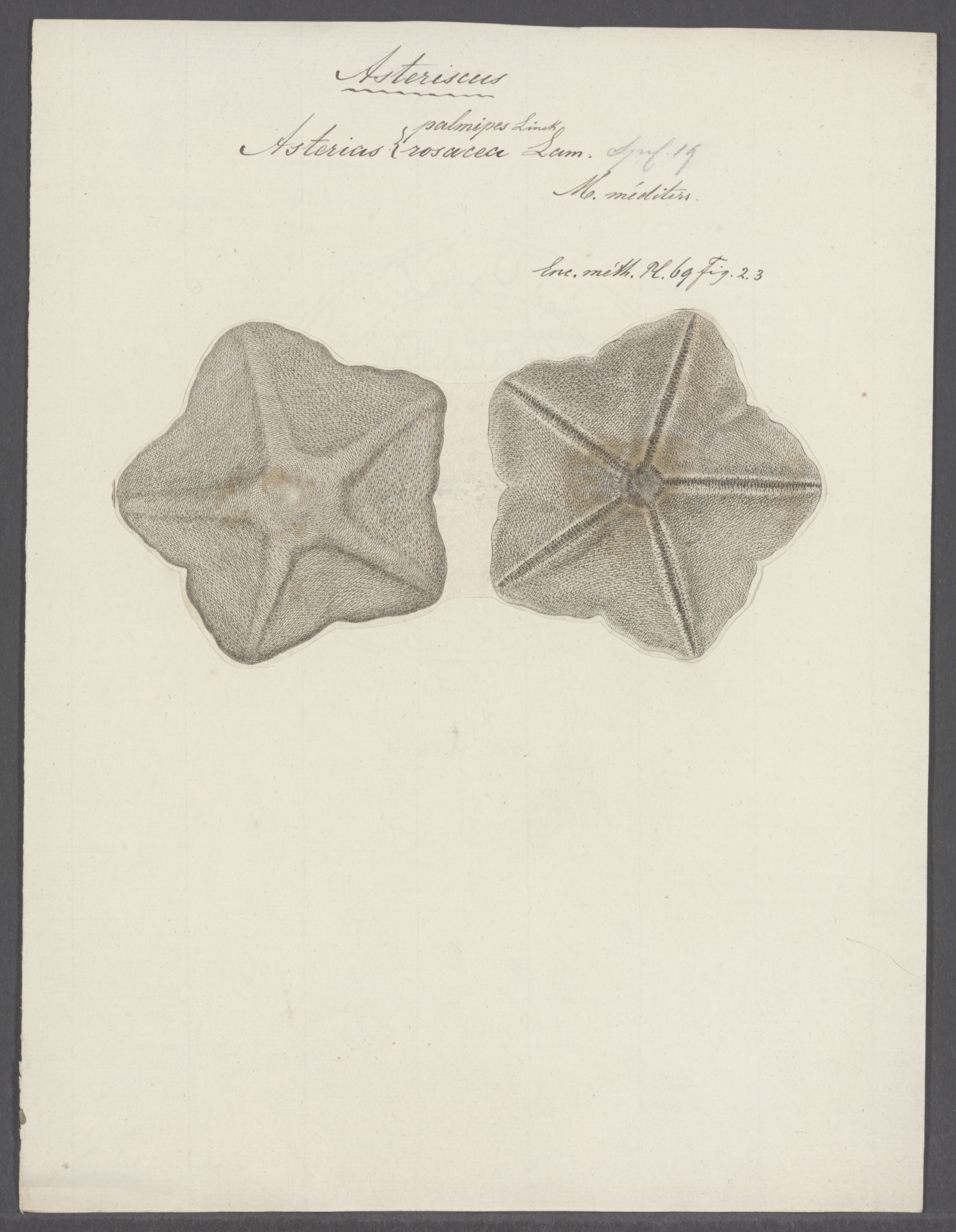
Illustration

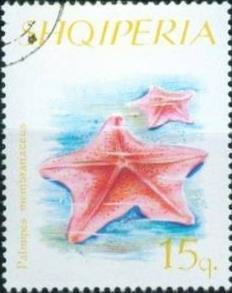
Depicted on an Albanian stamp
