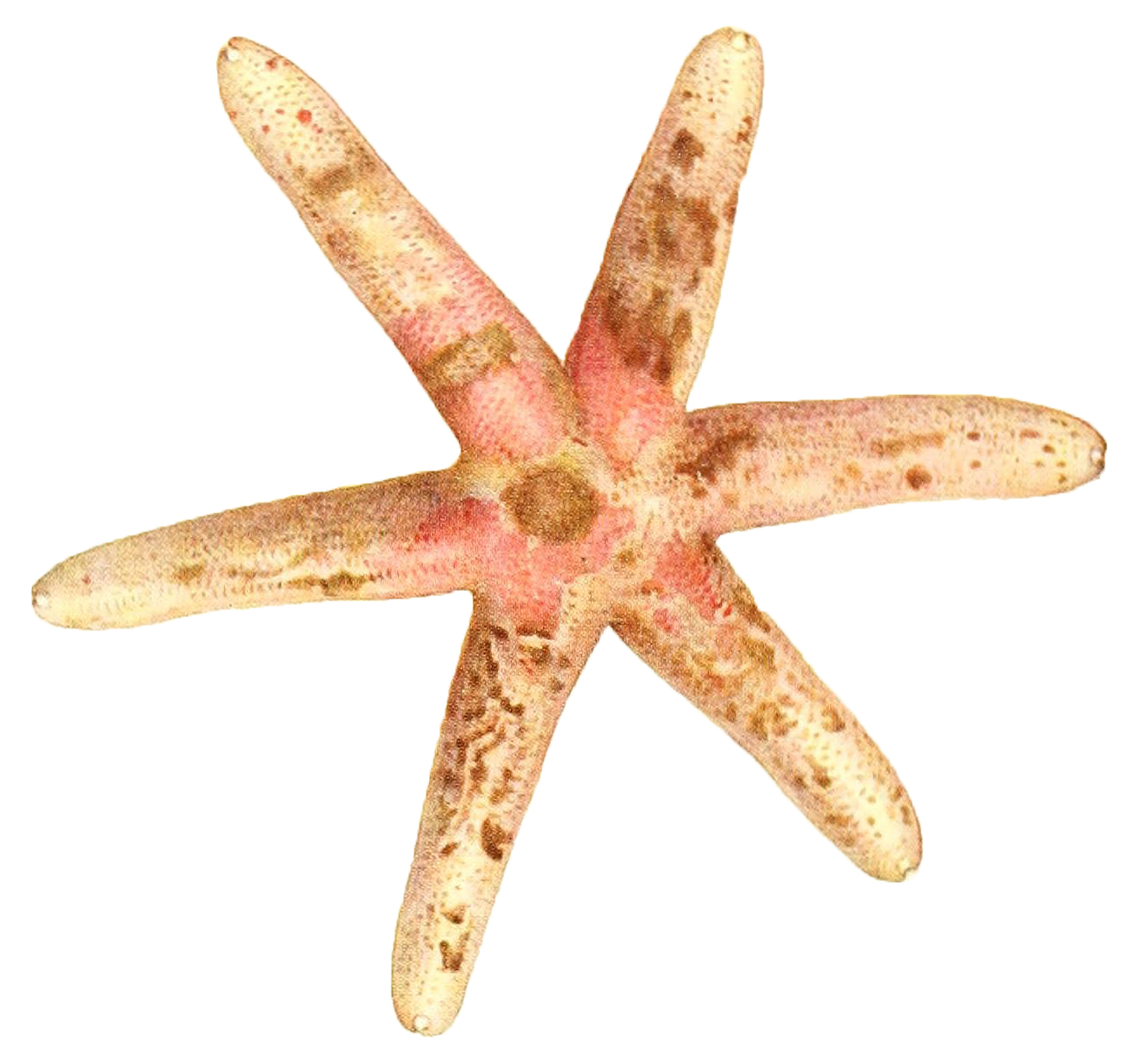
- Nepanthia belcheri

Scientific classification
- Kingdom: Animalia
- Phylum: Echinodermata
- Class: Asteroidea
- Order: Valvatida
- Family: Asterinidae
- Genus: Nepanthia; Gray, 1840

Species
- See text

Synonyms
- Henricides Verrill, 1914; Parasterina Fisher, 1908

= Nepanthia =

Genus of starfishes

Nepanthia is a genus of starfish of the family Asterinidae. Members of the genus have four to seven rays and are found in the eastern Pacific Ocean, ranging from Burma and Indonesia to Australia.

== Characteristics ==
Members of the genus Nepanthia are characterized by having four to seven rays that are narrowly flat actinally (underneath), sub-cylindrical and tapering with the marginal edge weakly angular. Pedicellariae are present as are transactinal plates and superactinal plates. The plates on the rays are not in series, there is usually a single papula per space, the spines are fine, glassy but not needle-shaped and the superomarginal plates are irregular. The type species is Nepanthia maculata Gray, 1840.

== Distribution ==
Members of the genus are found at depths down to about 123 m (404 ft) in Australia, Lord Howe Island, Indonesia, the Timor Sea, New Guinea, West Indonesia, the Philippines, Vietnam, Burma and the Mergui Archipelago.

== Species ==
The World Asteroidea Dartabase lists the following species:

- Nepanthia belcheri (Perrier, 1875)
- Nepanthia crassa (Gray, 1847)
- Nepanthia fisheri Rowe & Marsh, 1982
- Nepanthia maculata Gray, 1840
- Nepanthia pedicellaris Fisher, 1913
