= Maria Byrne (biologist) =

Marine biologist

- Employer: University of Sydney
- Known for: Marine Biology
- Title: Professor

Maria Byrne FAA is an Australian marine biologist, and professor of marine and developmental biology at the University of Sydney and a member of the Sydney Environment Institute. She spent 12 years as director of the university's research station on One Tree Island.

== Career ==
Byrne is the co-editor of Australian Echinoderms. She and co-author Tim O'Hara were joint winners of the 2018 Whitley Medal for the book. She has been publishing her research on Echinodermata since the early 1980s. In 2000-2002 she was the President of the Australian Marine Sciences Association.

Her research interests include the impact of climate change on marine invertebrates, She has published on sea-urchins and crown-of-thorns star-fish., as well as evolutionary developmental biology, She has also published on egg-provisioning, and the use of mass-spectrometry as well as the biology of the crown of thorns star-fish and other echinodermata. Her most cited article (October 2020) with 966 (or 1314) citations is "Global warming and recurrent mass bleaching of corals".

Byrne was elected Fellow of the Australian Academy of Science in 2019.

== Selected publications ==
- Uthicke, Sven; Schaffelke, Britta; Byrne, Maria (February 2009). "A boom–bust phylum? Ecological and evolutionary consequences of density variations in echinoderms". Ecological Monographs. 79 (1): 3–24. Bibcode:2009EcoM...79....3U. doi:10.1890/07-2136.1. ISSN 0012-9615.
- Byrne, M.; Przeslawski, R. (1 October 2013). "Multistressor Impacts of Warming and Acidification of the Ocean on Marine Invertebrates' Life Histories". Integrative and Comparative Biology. 53 (4): 582–596. doi:10.1093/icb/ict049. ISSN 1540-7063. PMID 23697893.
- Byrne, Maria; O'Hara, Tim, eds. (2017), Australian Echinoderms: Biology, ecology and evolution, CSIRO Publishing, ISBN 978-1-4863-0762-3
- Byrne, Maria (22 July 2020), "Ultrastructural changes in the autotomy tissues of Eupentacta quinquesemita (Selenka) (Echinodermata: Holothuroidea) during evisceration", in Keegan, Brendan F.; O'Connor, Brendan D.S. (eds.), Echinodermata (1 ed.), CRC Press, pp. 413–420, doi:10.1201/9781003079224-88, ISBN 978-1-003-07922-4, S2CID 55198726

== Awards ==
- 2019 - Established Researcher Medal for outstanding contribution to the science and management of Australian coral reefs, Australian Coral Reef Society.
- 2019 - Fellow, Australian Academy of Science (FAA)
- 2015 - Silver Jubilee Award, Australian Marine Sciences Association.
