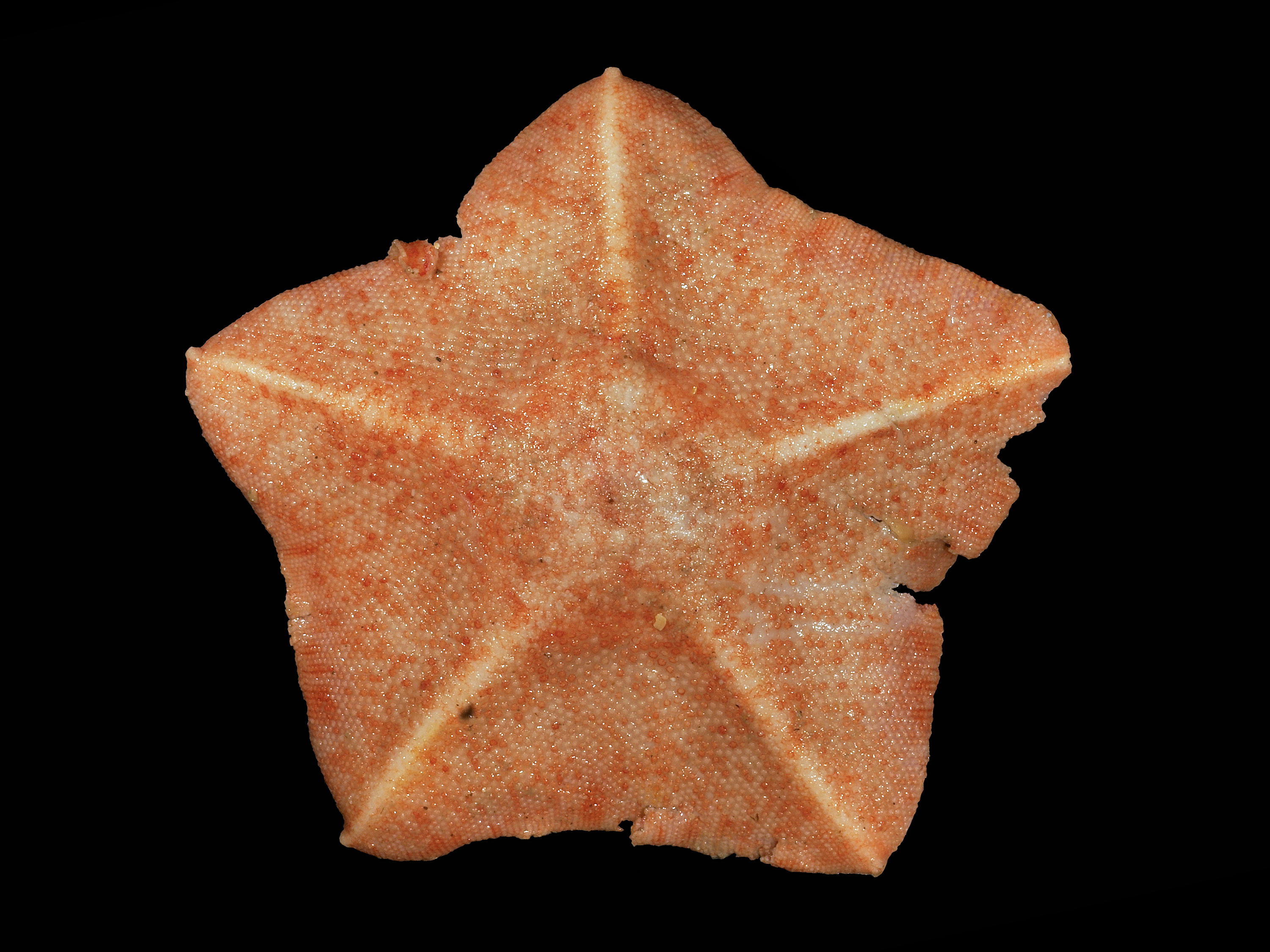
- Anseropoda placenta

Scientific classification
- Kingdom: Animalia
- Phylum: Echinodermata
- Class: Asteroidea
- Order: Valvatida
- Family: Asterinidae; Gray, 1840

Genera
- 25, see text.

= Asterinidae =

Family of starfishes

The Asterinidae are a large family of sea stars in the order Valvatida.

== Description and characteristics ==
These are generally small sea stars, flattened dorsally and bearing very short arms, often giving a pentagonal shape in the body; example: Asterians rubens (except in some species possessing more than five arms). The periphery of the body is thin and formed by indistinct, tiny marginal plates. They are characterized by their aboral face formed by plates shaped like crescents, sometimes giving a "knitted" appearance to the skin.

The abyssal species can be bigger, like those of the genus Anseropoda, which can exceed 45 cm in diameter.

== Biology ==
Most of the species are small and relatively cryptic: they are often found hidden under rocks or in crevices, for example. Several species have access to a fissiparous asexual reproduction, multiplying their reproductive potential. For that reason, some species of the genera Meridiastra and Aquilonastra can sometimes appear spontaneously in aquariums, where they can proliferate from just one larva imported inadvertently. Some species can brood their young (which thus do not pass through a planktonic larval stage), such as Asterina pancerii.

Most of the species feed on food fragments and algal or bacterial mat covering the substratum, evaginating their stomach on their food (a frequent feeding mode in sea stars). However, some species like Stegnaster inflatus takes advantage of their webbed shape to form a "trap" by heightening on the tip of their arms, and suddenly falling on a prey which would have believed to find shelter there.

They can be found in almost all the seas of the world, from the abysses to the surface and from the poles to the tropics.

== Genera ==
This family comprises about 21 genera and 116 species according to O'Loughlin & Waters (2004), whereas the World Asteroidea Database states that it includes 150 species in 25 genera.

Genera included in the family according to the World Asteroidea Database:

- Ailsastra O'Loughlin & Rowe, 2005
- Allopatiria Verrill, 1913
- Anseropoda Nardo, 1834
- Aquilonastra O'Loughlin in O'Loughlin & Waters, 2004
- Asterina Nardo, 1834
- Asterinides Verrill, 1913
- Asterinopsis Verrill, 1913
- Callopatiria Verrill, 1913
- Cryptasterina Dartnall & al. 2003
- Disasterina Perrier, 1875
- Indianastra O'Loughlin in O'Loughlin & Waters, 2004
- Kampylaster Koehler, 1920
- Manasterina H.L. Clark, 1938
- Meridiastra O'Loughlin, 2002
- Nepanthia Gray, 1840
- Paranepanthia Fisher, 1917
- Parvulastra O'Loughlin in O'Loughlin & Waters, 2004
- Patiria Gray, 1840
- Patiriella Verrill, 1913
- Pseudasterina Aziz & Jangoux, 1985
- Pseudonepanthia A.H. Clark, 1916
- Pseudopatiria O'Loughlin in O'Loughlin & Waters, 2004
- Stegnaster Sladen, 1889
- Tegulaster Livingstone, 1933
- Tremaster Verrill, 1880
- Ctenaster L. Agassiz, 1836
- Desmopatiria Verrill, 1913
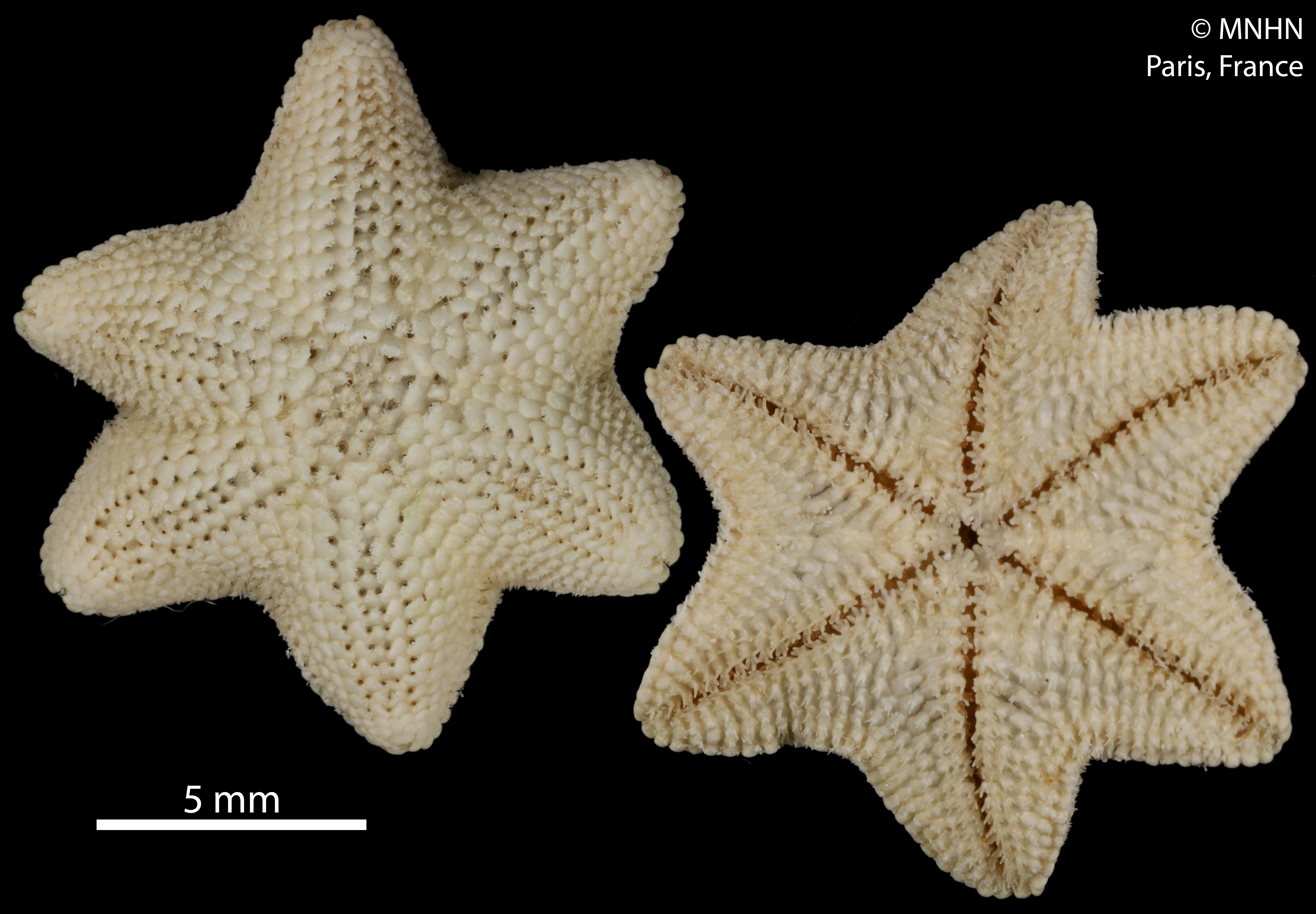
Ailsastra eleaumei (MNHN)

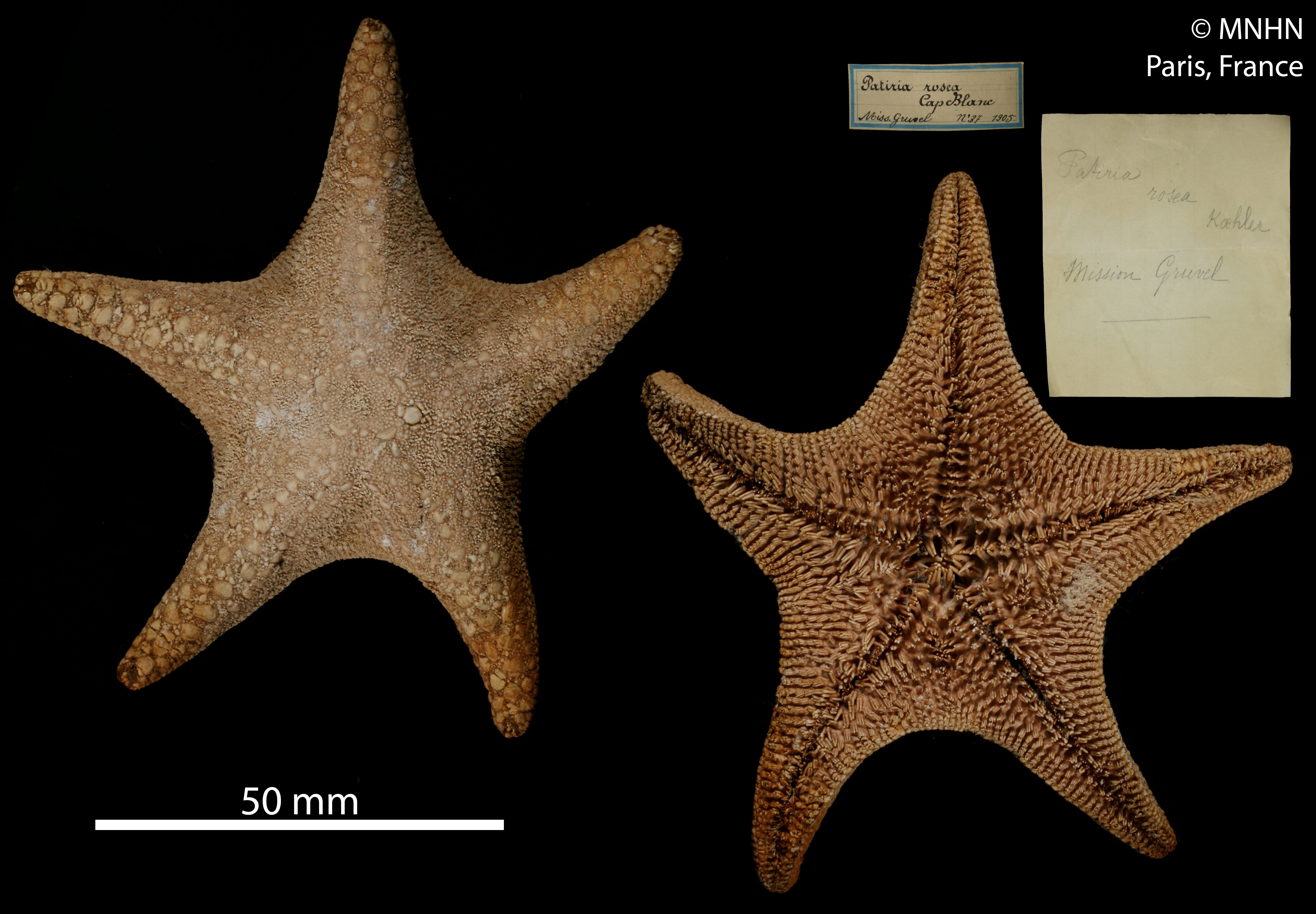
Allopatiria ocellifera (MNHN)

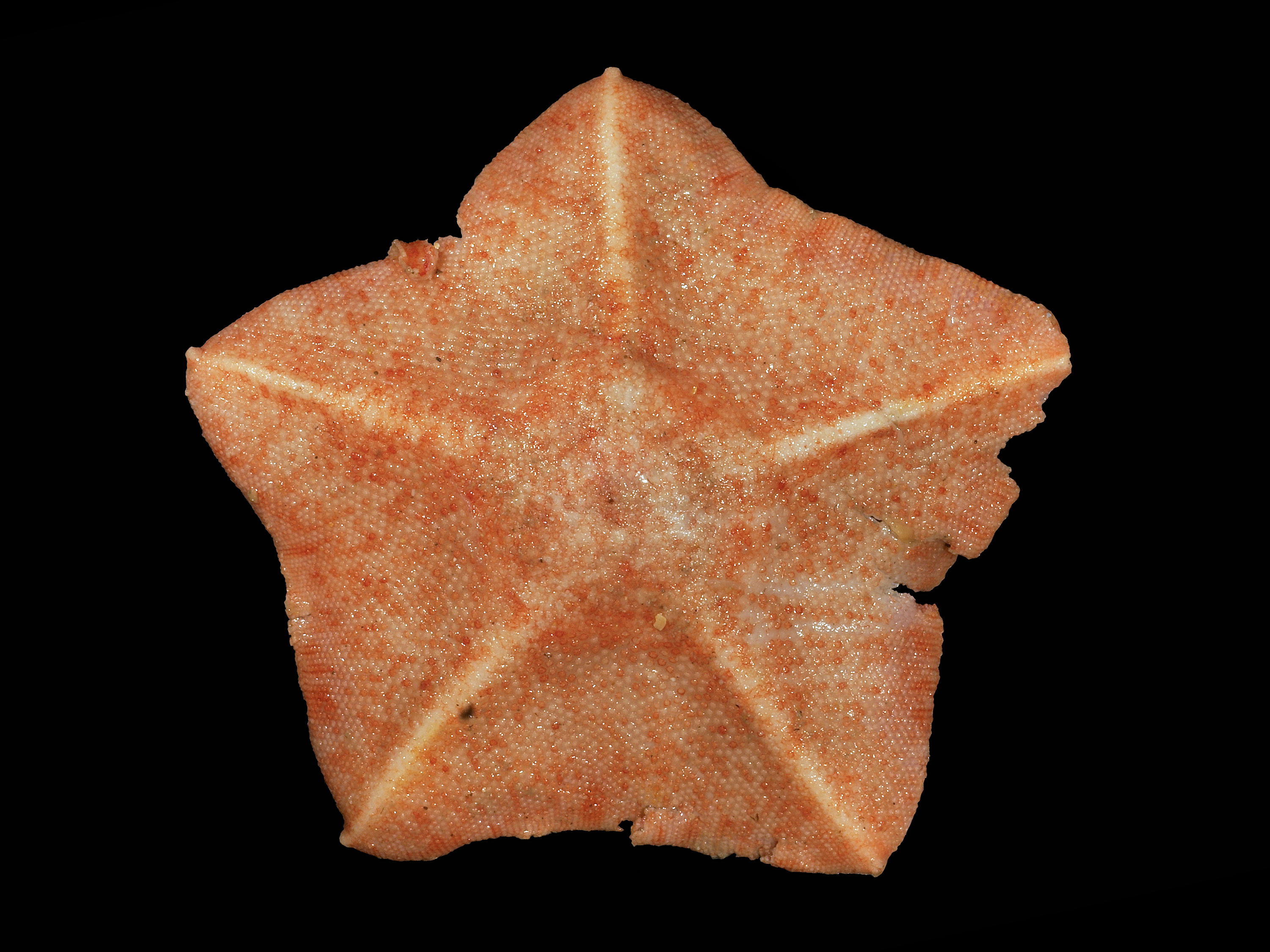
Anseropoda placenta

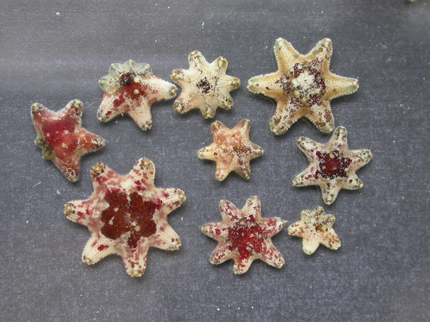
Aquilonastra conandae

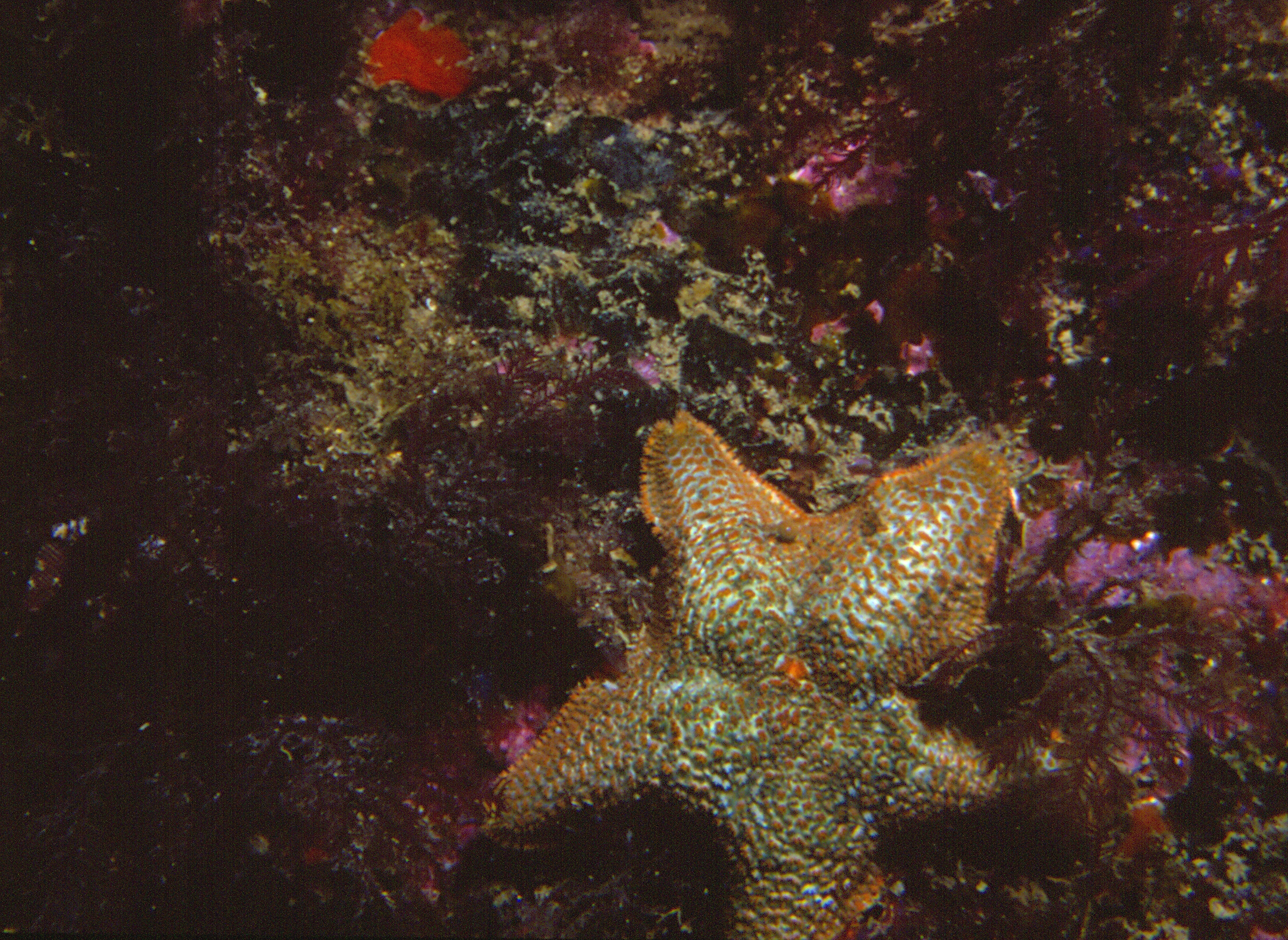
Asterina gibbosa

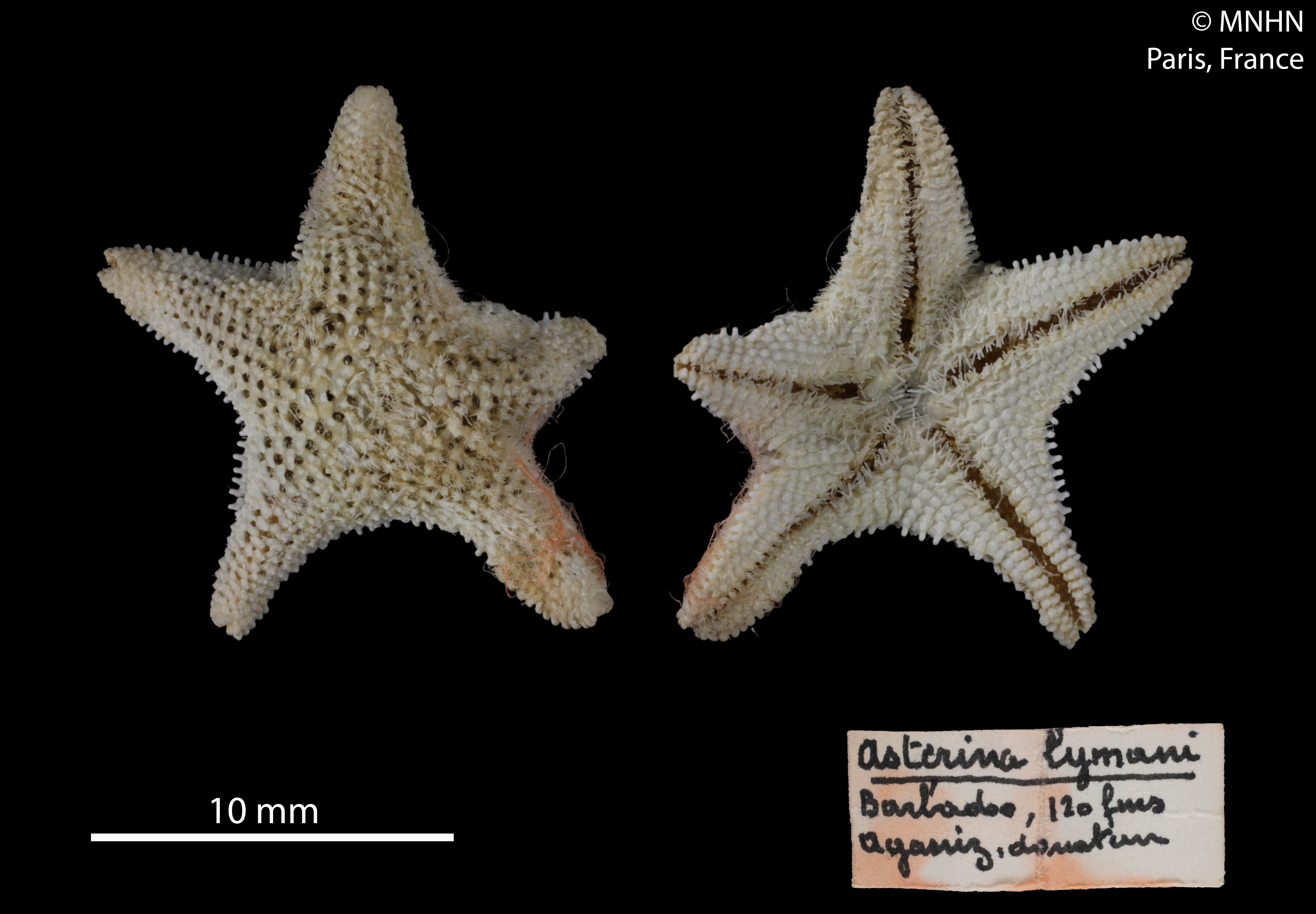
Asterinides pilosa (MNHN)

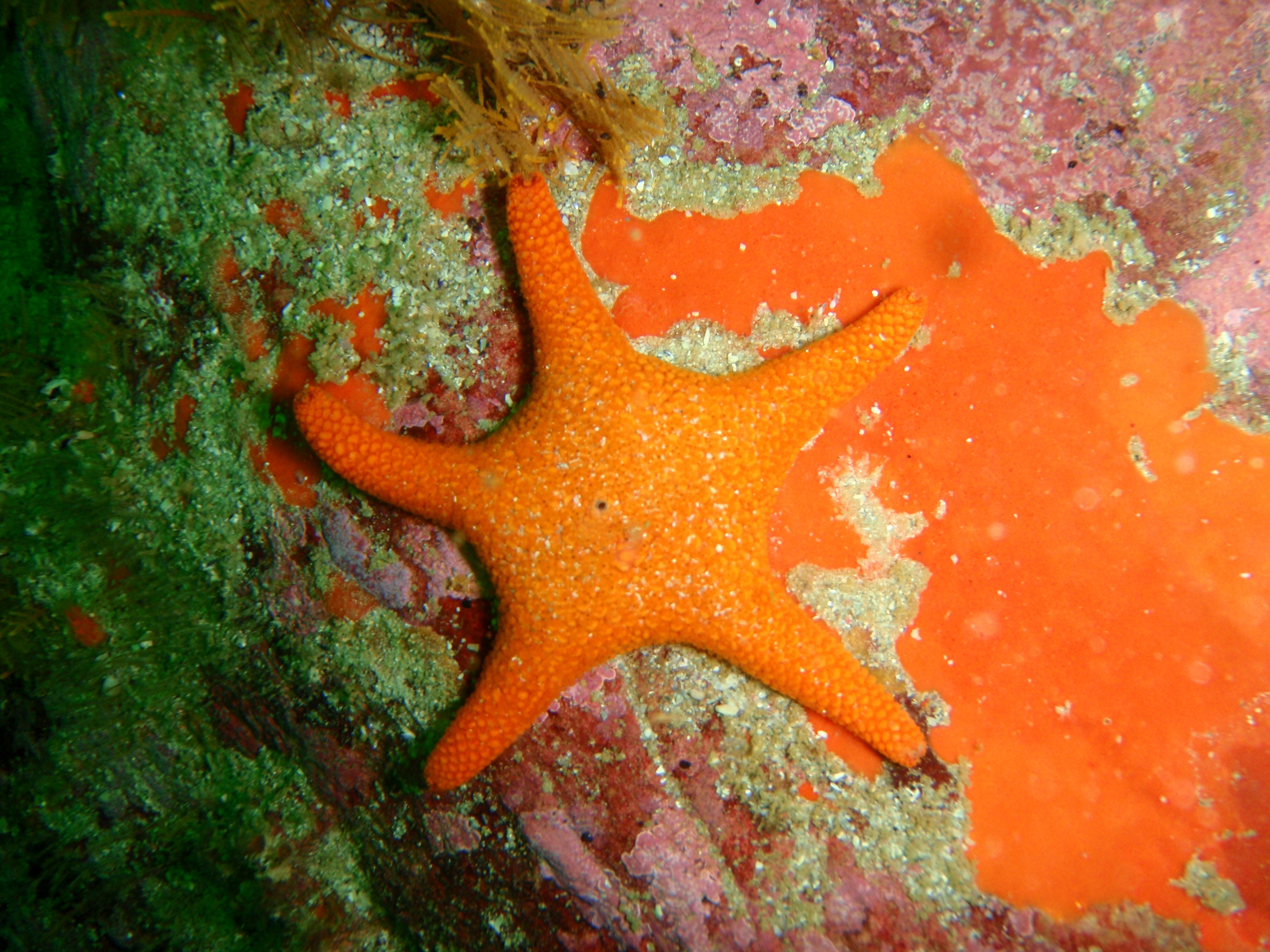
Callopatiria granifera

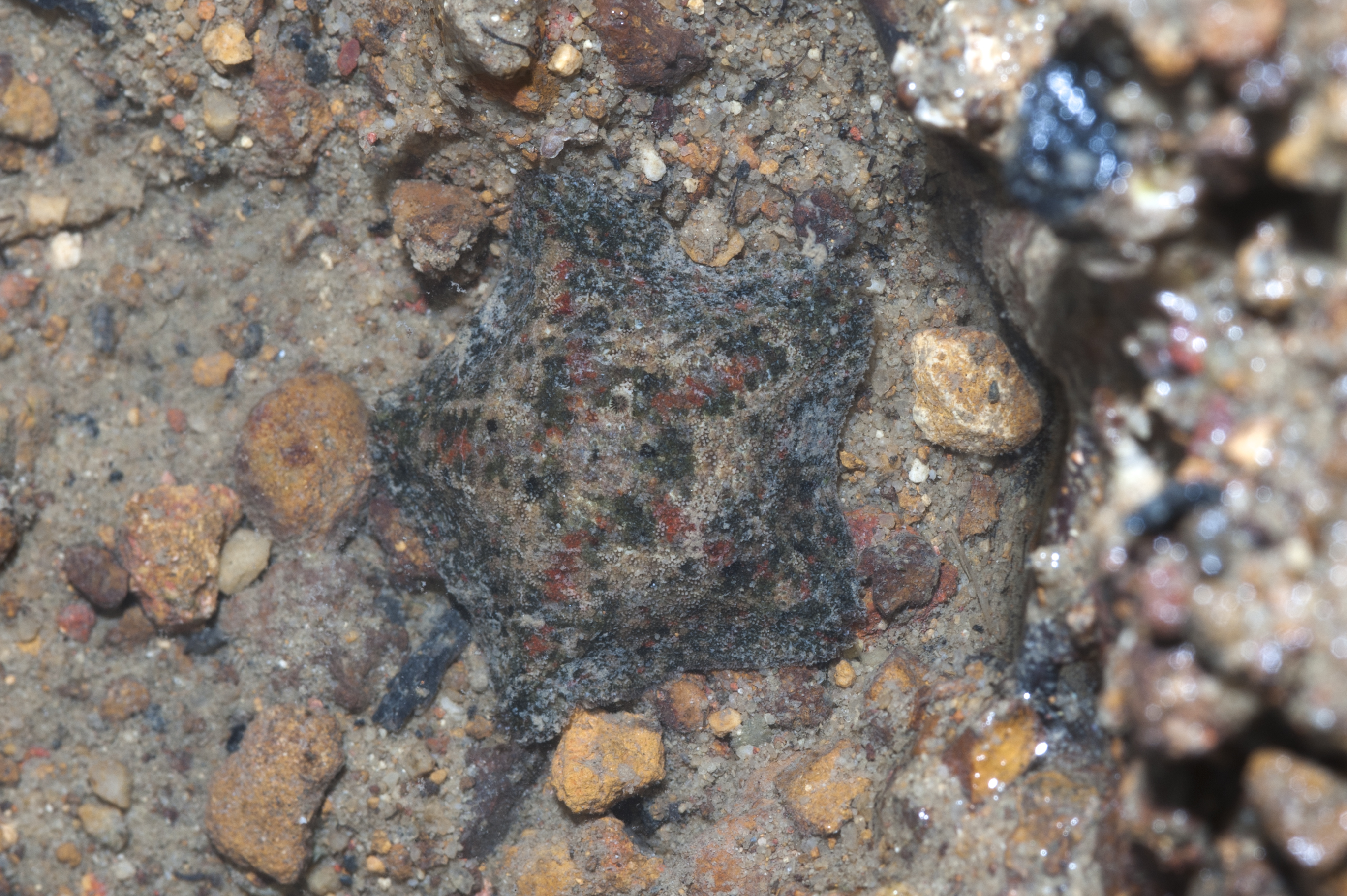
Cryptasterina sp.

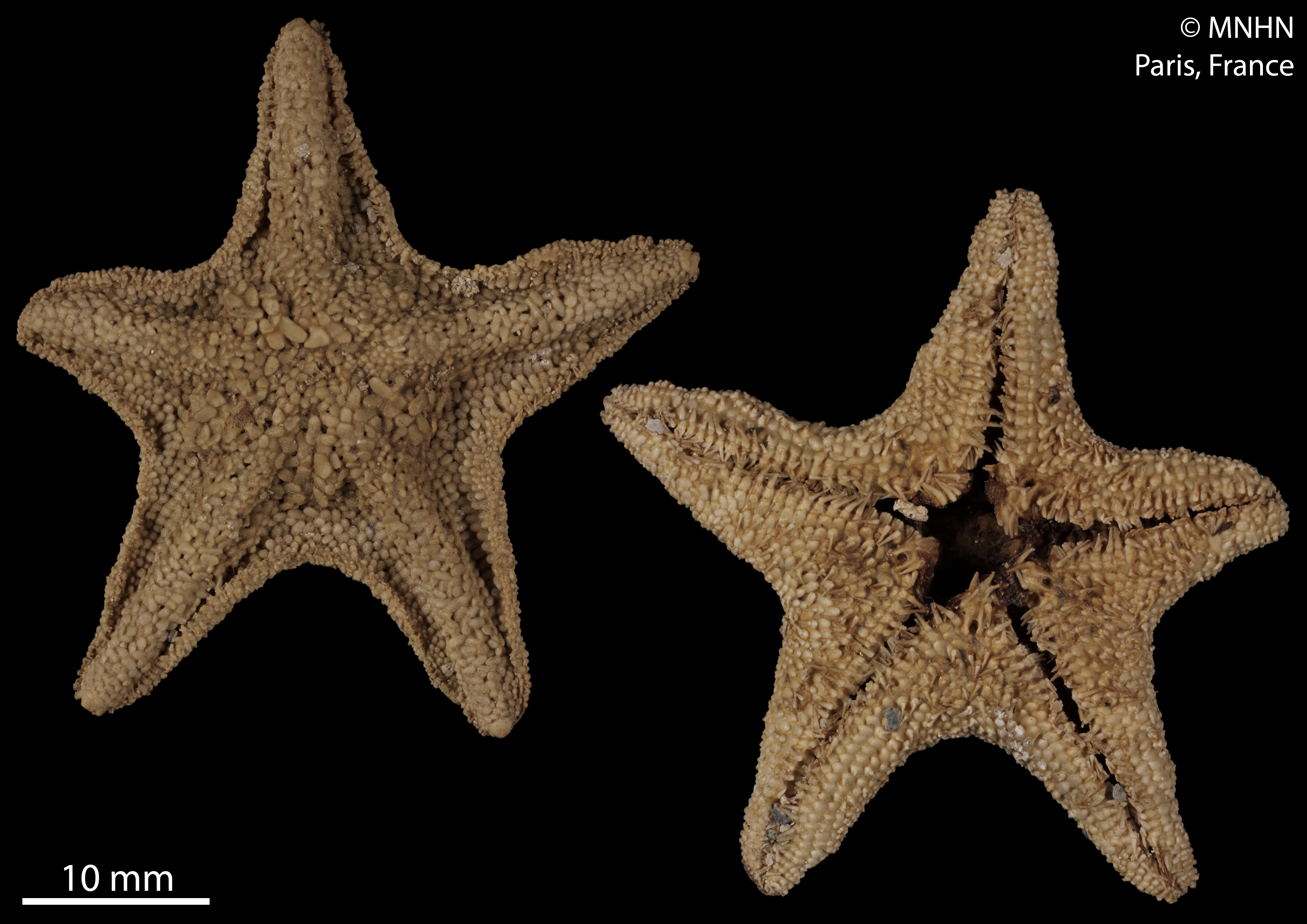
Disasterina abnormalis

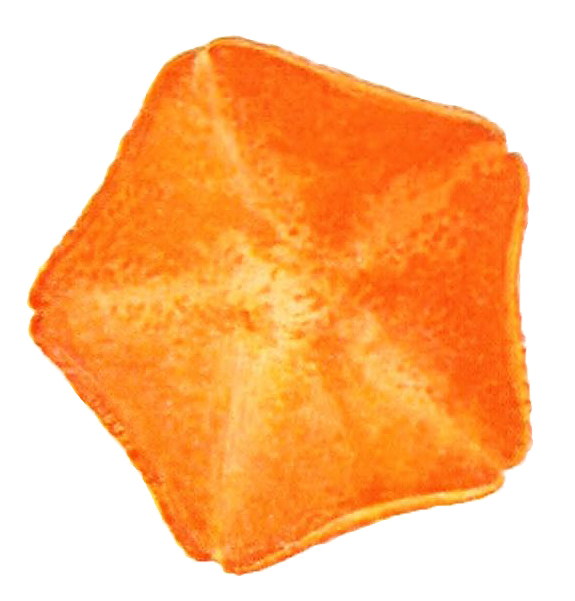
Indianastra sarasini

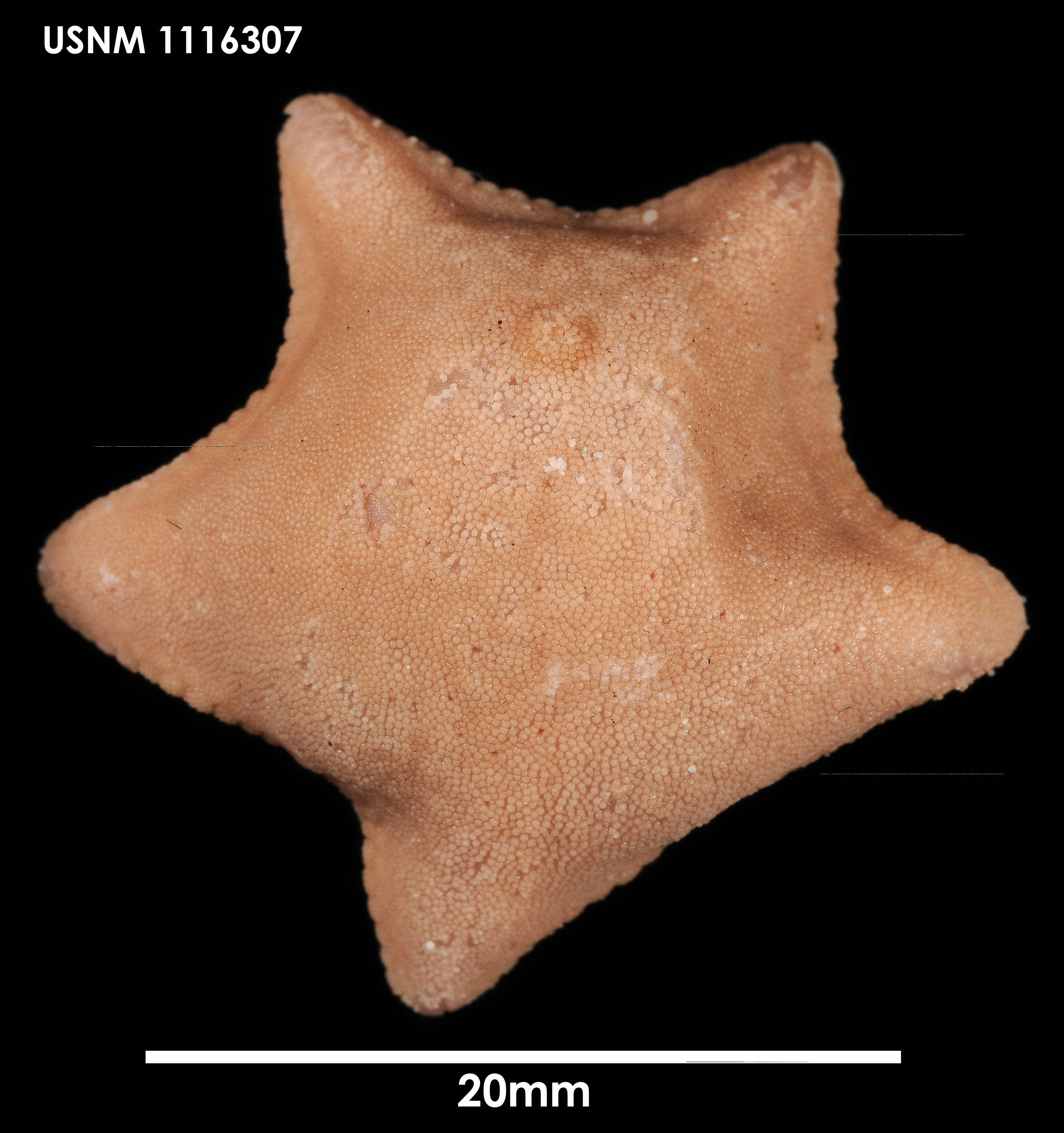
Kampylaster incurvatus

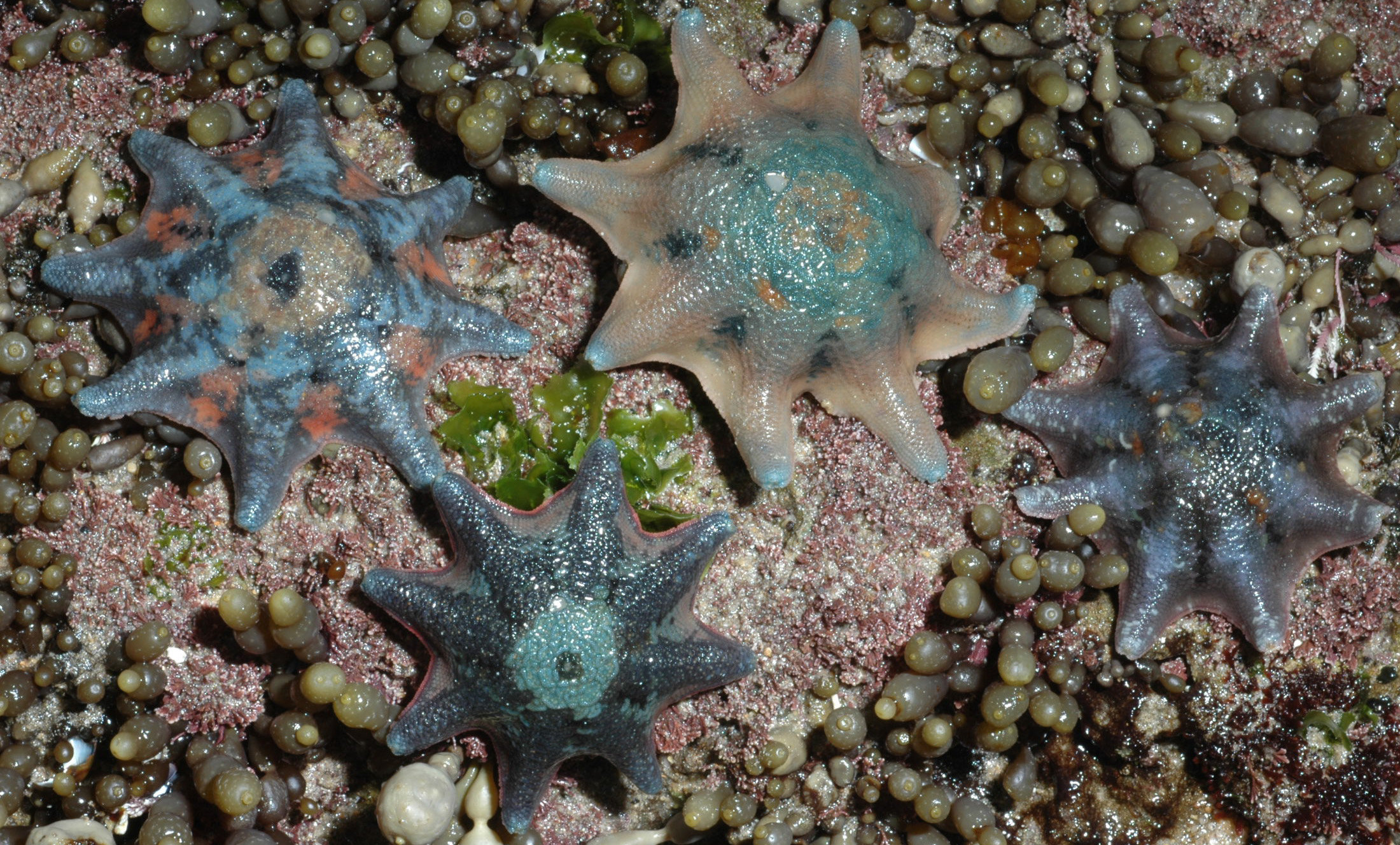
Meridiastra calcar

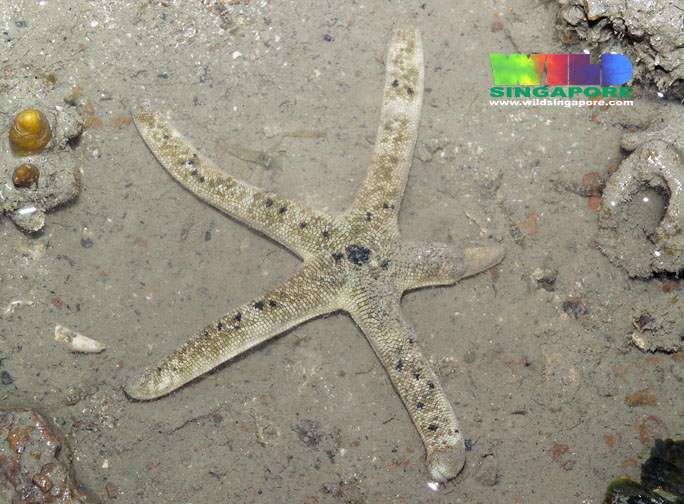
Nepanthia maculata

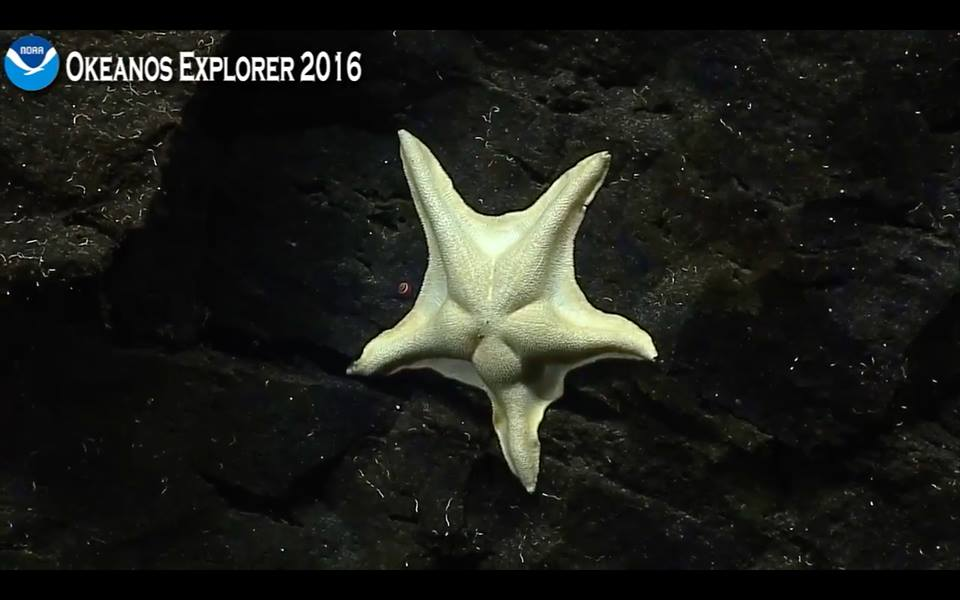
Paranepanthia sp.

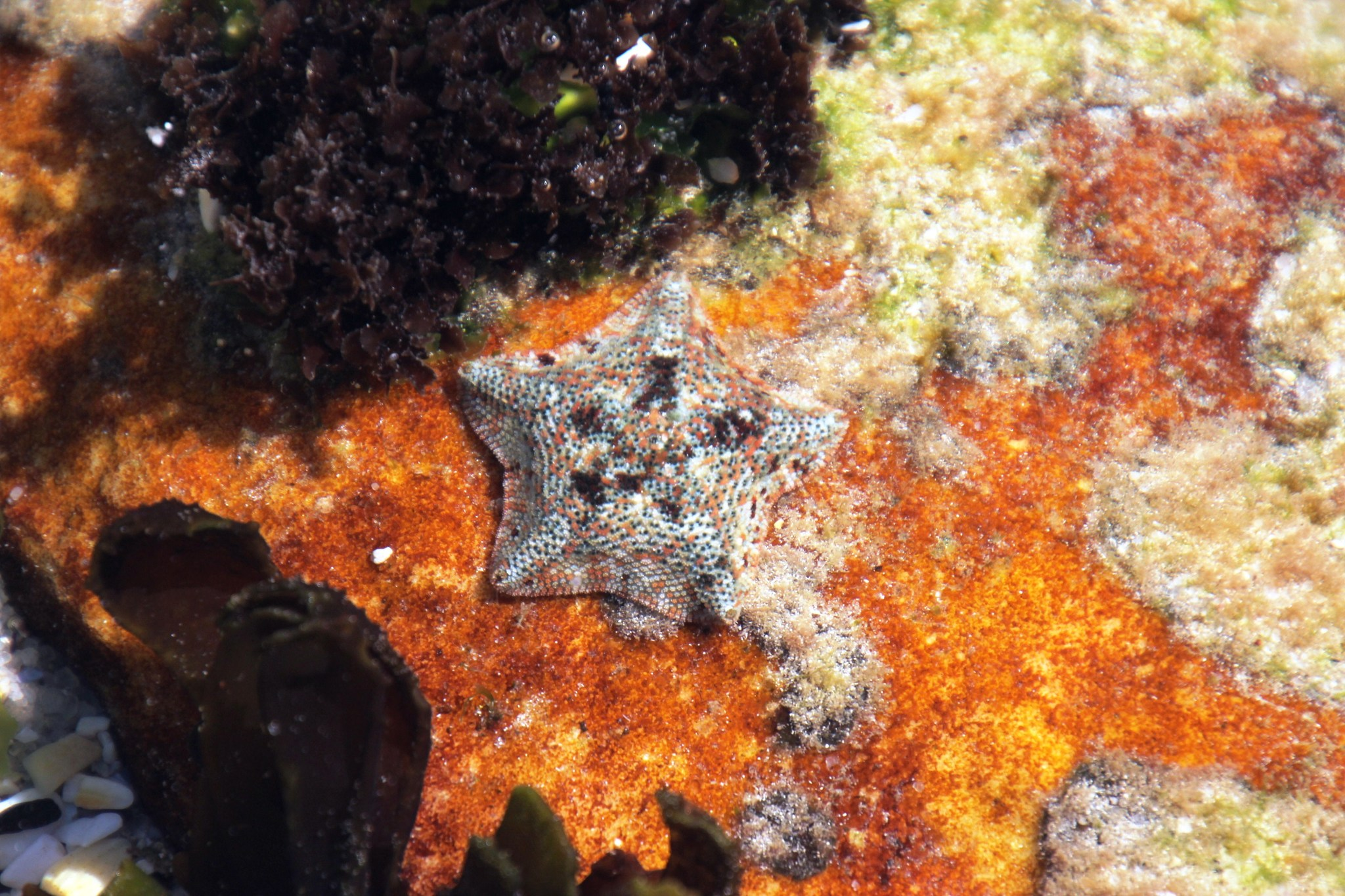
Parvulastra exigua

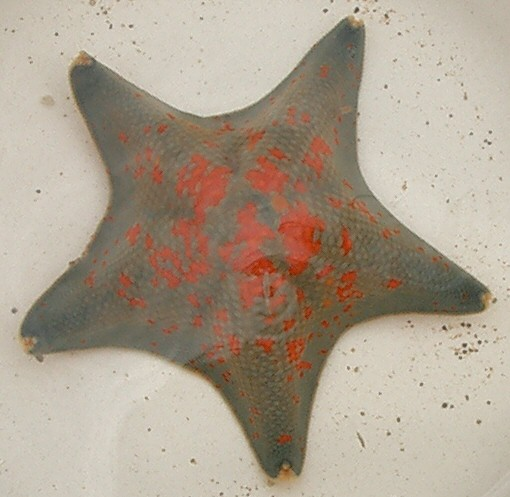
Patiria pectinifera

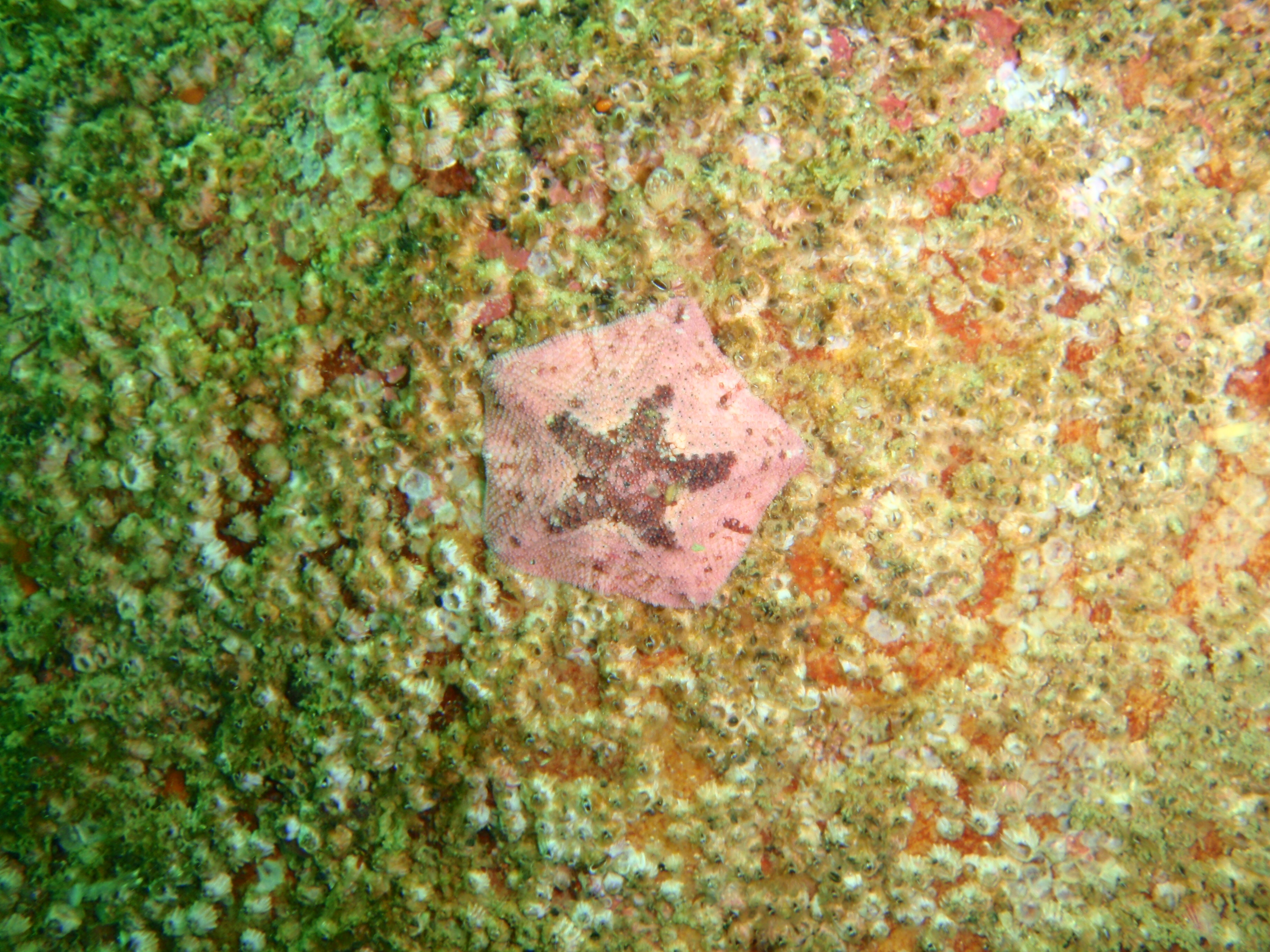
Patiriella dyscrita

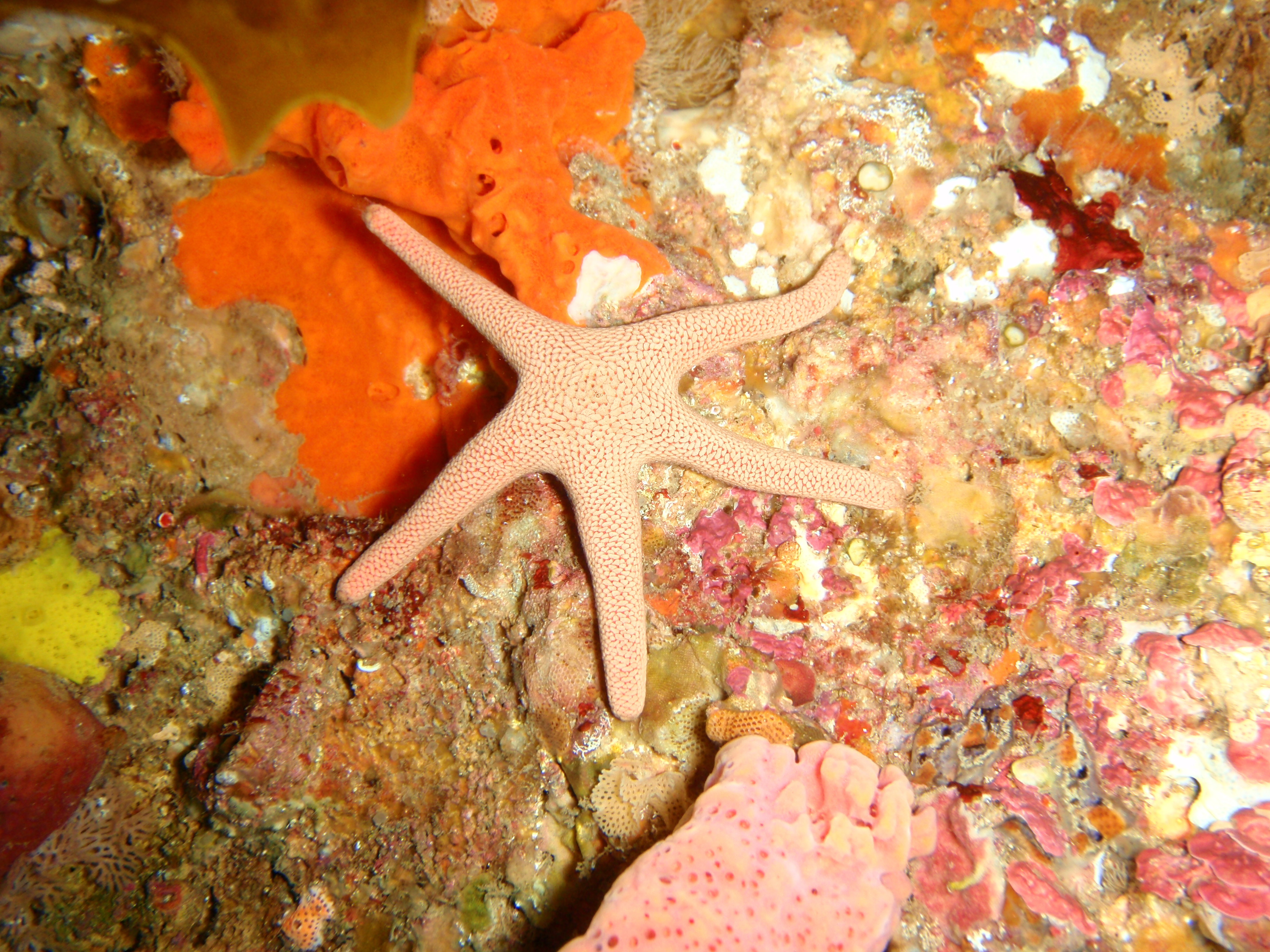
Pseudonepanthia troughtoni

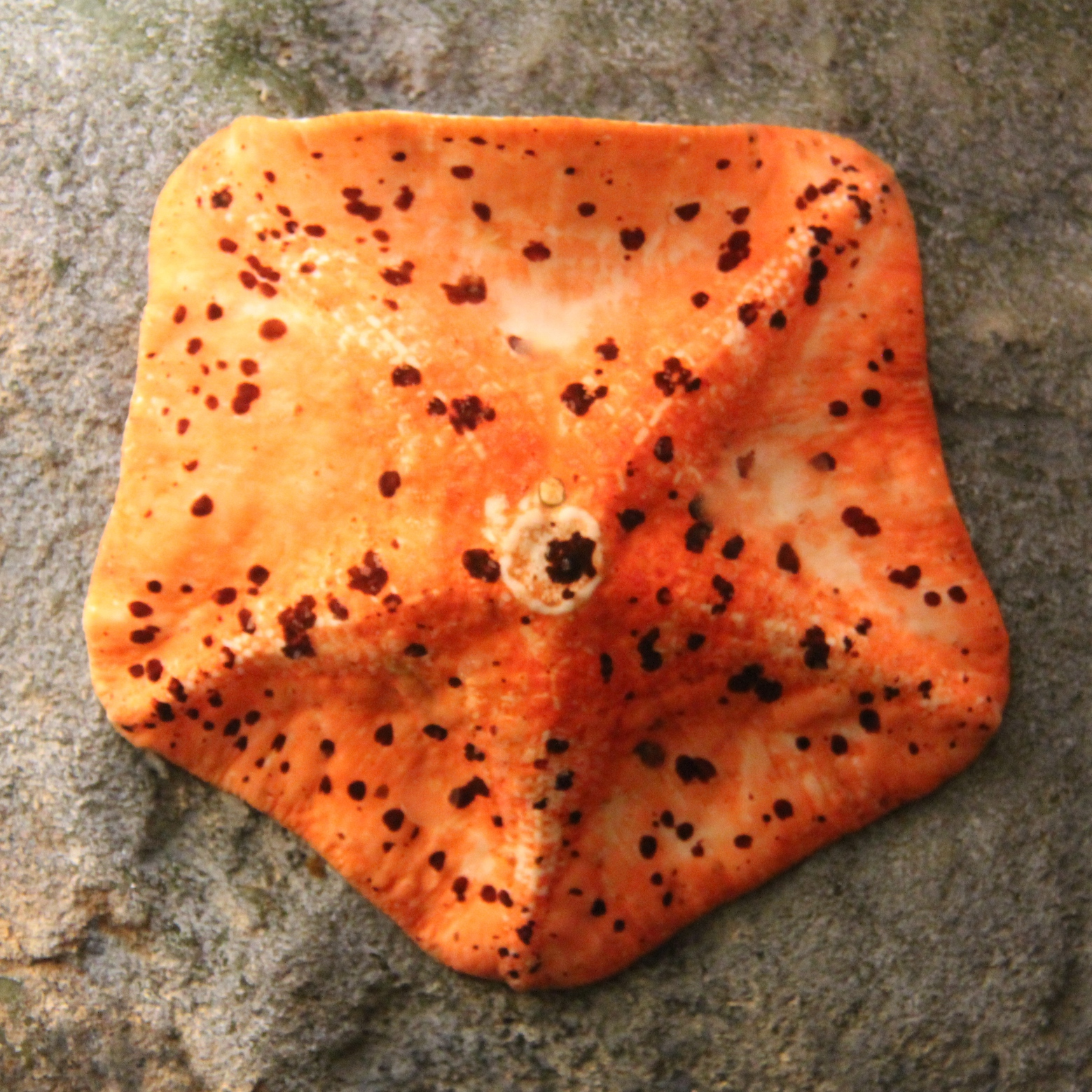
Stegnaster inflatus

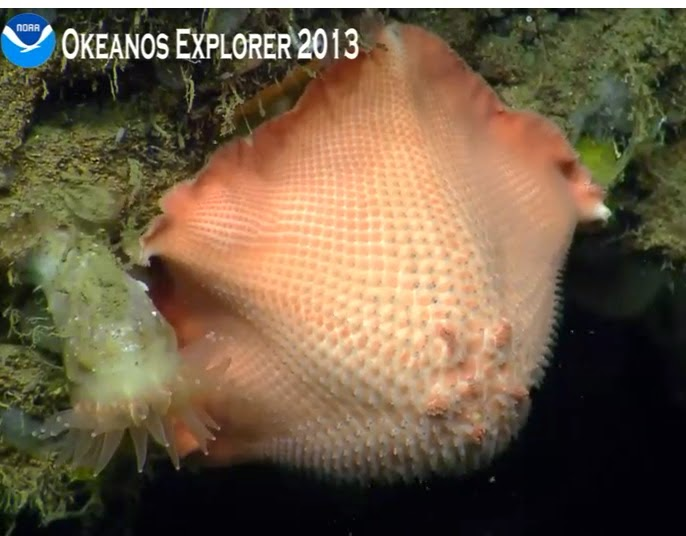
Tremaster mirabilis

== Bibliography ==
- P. M. O'Loughlin; J. M. Waters (2004). "A molecular and morphological revision of genera of Asterinidae (Echinodermata: Asteroidea)". Memoirs of Museum Victoria. 61 (1): 1–40. doi:10.24199/j.mmv.2004.61.1.
- Byrne, Maria (2006). "Life history diversity and evolution in the Asterinidae". Integrative and Comparative Biology. 46 (3): 1–12. doi:10.1093/icb/icj033. PMID 21672739.
