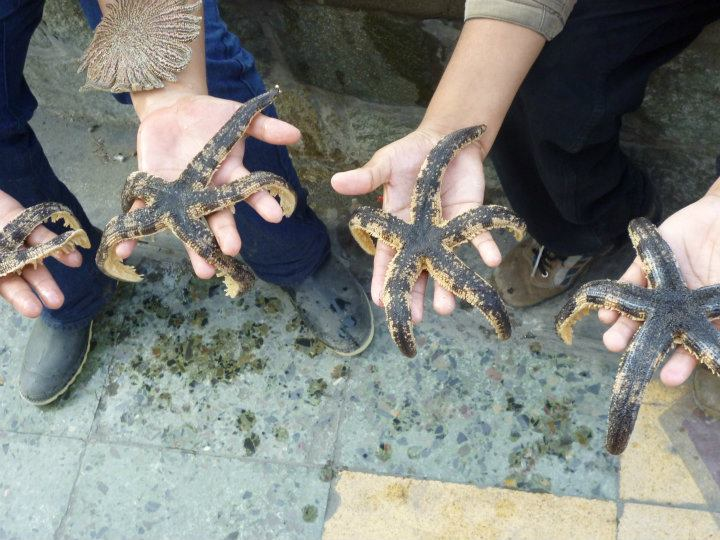

Scientific classification
- Domain: Eukaryota
- Kingdom: Animalia
- Phylum: Echinodermata
- Class: Asteroidea
- Order: Paxillosida
- Family: Luidiidae
- Genus: Luidia
- Species: L. magellanica

Binomial name
- Luidia magellanica Leipoldt, 1895

Synonyms
- Asterias terwieli Goldschmidt, 1924; Smilasterias terweili (Goldschmidt, 1924)

= Luidia magellanica =

Species of starfish

Luidia magellanica is a species of starfish in the family Luidiidae. It is found in the southeastern Pacific Ocean on the coast of South America.

== Distribution and habitat ==
Luidia magellanica occurs subtidally in the southeastern Pacific Ocean, on the coasts of Peru and Chile. Its typical habitat is on rock bottoms with encrusting red algae, Lithophyllum, or soft sediments composed of coarse sand and shell fragments.

== Ecology ==
Luidia magellanica is a large and aggressive specialist predator of other echinoderms. Its diet includes brittle stars such as Ophiactis, sea urchins such as Tetrapygus niger and starfish such as Patiria. In the subtidal zone of temperate Chile it feeds on eight different species of echinoderm, and with Meyenaster gelatinosus is the dominant predator. Many of the starfish in this zone have missing or regenerating arms, and this is likely to be as a result of a near-lethal encounter with either L. magellanica or M. gelatinosus. Both of these species also exhibit cannibalism. When attacked by M. gelatinosus or by a larger member of its own species, L. magellanica tends to autotomise some 4 to 5 cm (1.6 to 2.0 in) of a single arm. In a study off the coast of Chile, between 50 and 70% of individual L. magellanica were found to have regenerating arms.

Other species of starfish recorded in the same zone in the cold waters off Peru are Patiria chilensis, Stichaster striatus and Meyenaster gelatinosus. L. magellanica plays an important role in the control of grazing echinoids, and such factors as El Niño events can alter the population dynamics. If fewer L. magellanica are recruited because of temperature and other factors, more grazers such as Tetrapygus niger survive, and barren areas occur. Alternatively, when more of the starfish are present, fewer grazers cause less damage and the kelp flourishes unchecked.
