= Dipleurula =

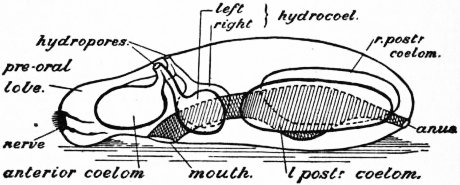
Diagrammatic reconstruction of Dipleurula from Encyclopædia Britannica, 1911, adapted from Bather, 1900. Bather drew the creature as crawling on the sea-floor, but echinoderm larvae are usually pelagic (free-floating). The ciliated bands are not drawn.

Dipleurula is a hypothetical larva of the ancestral echinoderm. It represents the type of basis of all larval forms of, at least, the eleutherozoans (all echinoderms except crinoids), where the starfish, sea urchins, sea cucumbers and brittle stars belong. The dipleurula is a bilaterally symmetrical, ciliated echinoderm larva (cilia devoted to movement, feeding and perception).

== Etymology ==
Derives from Ancient Greek di, meaning 'two' and the small form of pleura (pleurula), meaning 'little side', i.e. 'little, two-sided [larva]'.

== History ==
Although the term dipleurula stems from Semon (1888), it was first systematically introduced, described and drawn by Bather (1900) in his monography on the echinoderms. The name dipleurula, two-sided, was given to stress the fact that the larva of the typically five-rayed, (approximately) radially symmetric adults show a bilateral structure. It was this bilateral structure of the larvae that identified echinoderms as bilaterian animals.

The original doliolaria schema shows a benthic, crawling, larva. However Bather could not have known yet that larval echinoderms are typically pelagic (free-floating plankton).

== Structure ==
The hypothetical dipleurula larva bears resemblance to stages of all extant echinoderms, such as the bipinnaria and the brachiolaria of the starfish, the auricularia of the sea cucumbers, the echinopluteus larva of the sea urchins, and the ophiopluteus of the brittle stars. Also the doliolaria of the crinoids (sea-lilies and feather stars) can be attributed to the same basic pattern. Note, that the extant echinoderms represent just a small window on the extraordinary diversity of early echinoderms as known from their rich fossil record. Although there is current research on fossilized larval skeletons, the doliolaria remains a hypothesis.

The doliolaria shows a three-partite body, each of which develop paired coelomic spaces which originate from the enterocoel. This, and their close resemblance to the tornaria larva of hemichordates, identifies them as deuterostomes. The anterior coeloms are known as axocoel, the medial ones as hydrocoel and the posterior ones as somatocoels. In extant echinoderm larva, the coeloms on the right side of the larva are typically much smaller than the ones on the left side, or even rudimentary. The right hydrocoel may fuse with the right axocoel.
