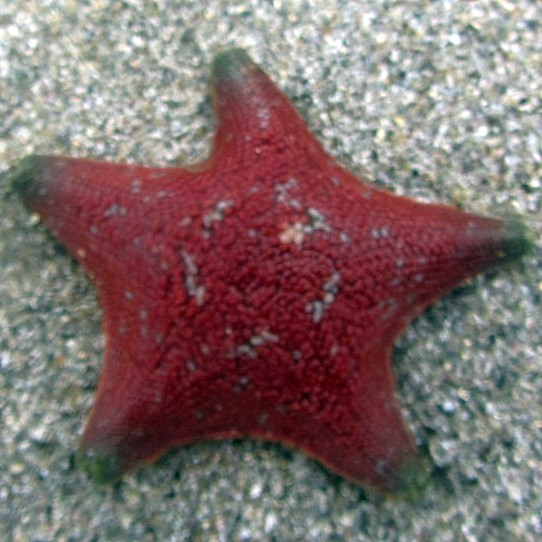

Scientific classification
- Kingdom: Animalia
- Phylum: Echinodermata
- Class: Asteroidea
- Order: Valvatida
- Family: Asterinidae
- Genus: Patiria
- Species: P. chilensis

Binomial name
- Patiria chilensis (Lütken, 1859)

Synonyms
- Asterina chilensis Lutken, 1859; Asterina gayi Perrier, 1875; Asteriscus chilensis Lutken, 1859; Patiria gayi (Perrier, 1876)

= Patiria chilensis =

Species of starfish

Patiria chilensis is a species of starfish in the family Asterinidae. It is found in the southeastern Pacific Ocean along the coasts of South America. It is a broadly pentagonal, cushion-like starfish with five short arms.

== Ecology ==
P. chilensis occurs in the rocky intertidal zone in temperate seas off the coast of Chile. It is mainly present in the lower algal zone, dominated by the kelps Lessonia nigrescens and Durvillaea antarctica and various encrusting coralline algae. Echinoids occurring in this zone include Loxechinus albus and Tetrapygus niger, and starfish include Stichaster striatus, Meyenaster gelatinosus and the dominant Heliaster helianthus. These starfish are the dominant carnivores in this zone and seem to play an important role in maintaining the community structure. Besides being a predator of sessile organisms, P. chilensis is an opportunistic feeder, scavenging for dead animal matter and detritus. It is a small species, and avoids being preyed on by the larger starfish by tending to remain in concealed locations. It is not known to shed its arms, as do many of the other starfish species in the locality, but the arms sometimes get amputated, perhaps eaten by fish. When that happens, the arms do not regenerate, but the thick skin closes over the wound to heal it.

Like other echinoids, pollution can affect this species. The opening of a new sea outlet from a copper mine at Caleta Palito in Chile in 1975 caused mass mortality of the starfish Stichaster striatus, Meyenaster gelatinosus and Patiria chilensis and the sea urchin Tetrapygus niger, which disappeared completely from the area.
