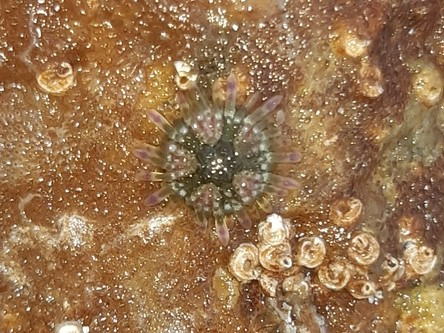

Scientific classification
- Kingdom: Animalia
- Phylum: Echinodermata
- Class: Echinoidea
- Order: Arbacioida
- Family: Arbaciidae
- Genus: Arbacia
- Species: A. nigra

Binomial name
- Arbacia nigra (Molina, 1782)

Synonyms
- Tetrapygus niger (Molina, 1782); Echinocidaris nigra (Molina, 1782); Echinus niger Molina, 1782; Echinus purpurescens Valenciennes, 1846; Pygomma nigrum (Molina, 1782)

= Arbacia nigra =

Genus of sea urchins

Arbacia nigra (= Tetrapygus niger) is a species of sea urchins in the family Arbaciidae. It was first described by the Chilean naturalist Juan Ignacio Molina in 1782. It is found in the southeastern Pacific Ocean on the coasts of South America.

== Description ==
The oral (under) surface of the test is flattened while the aboral (upper) surface is shallowly domed. There is a small apical disc and the ambulacral areas are straight. There are up to five large primary tubercles in rows in the inter-ambulacral areas, interspersed with smaller secondary tubercles. The mouth is surrounded by a sunken subpentagonal peristome which is half as wide as the test. The primary spines are moderately long while the secondary spines are short. The colour of this sea urchin is purplish-black.

== Distribution ==
Arbacia nigra is found in the southeastern Pacific Ocean on the coasts of Peru and Chile, its range extending from northern Peru to the Strait of Magellan, at depths down to about 40 m (130 ft). It is the most common sea urchin on this stretch of coast.

== Ecology ==
Arbacia nigra is a herbivore and grazes on the kelp Lessonia trabeculata, the main constituent of the kelp forests on the rocky coasts of Chile. Excessive grazing by the sea urchin causes lack of recruitment of the kelp because the sea urchin completely consumes young plants, while it only feeds on the stipe (stalk) of older plants.

Starfish including Luidia magellanica, Meyenaster gelatinosus, Stichaster striatus and Heliaster helianthus prey heavily on grazing herbivores such as T. niger. In 1998–1999, T. niger had a population explosion in northern Chile, possibly linked to a decrease in the numbers of predatory starfish, L. magellanica and M. gelatinosus, which decrease was probably caused by failure of the starfish to recruit as a result of the previous year's El Niño. This resulted in a tendency to form "urchin barrens" with no macro-algae and limited biodiversity, the rocks being covered with encrusting coralline algae.
