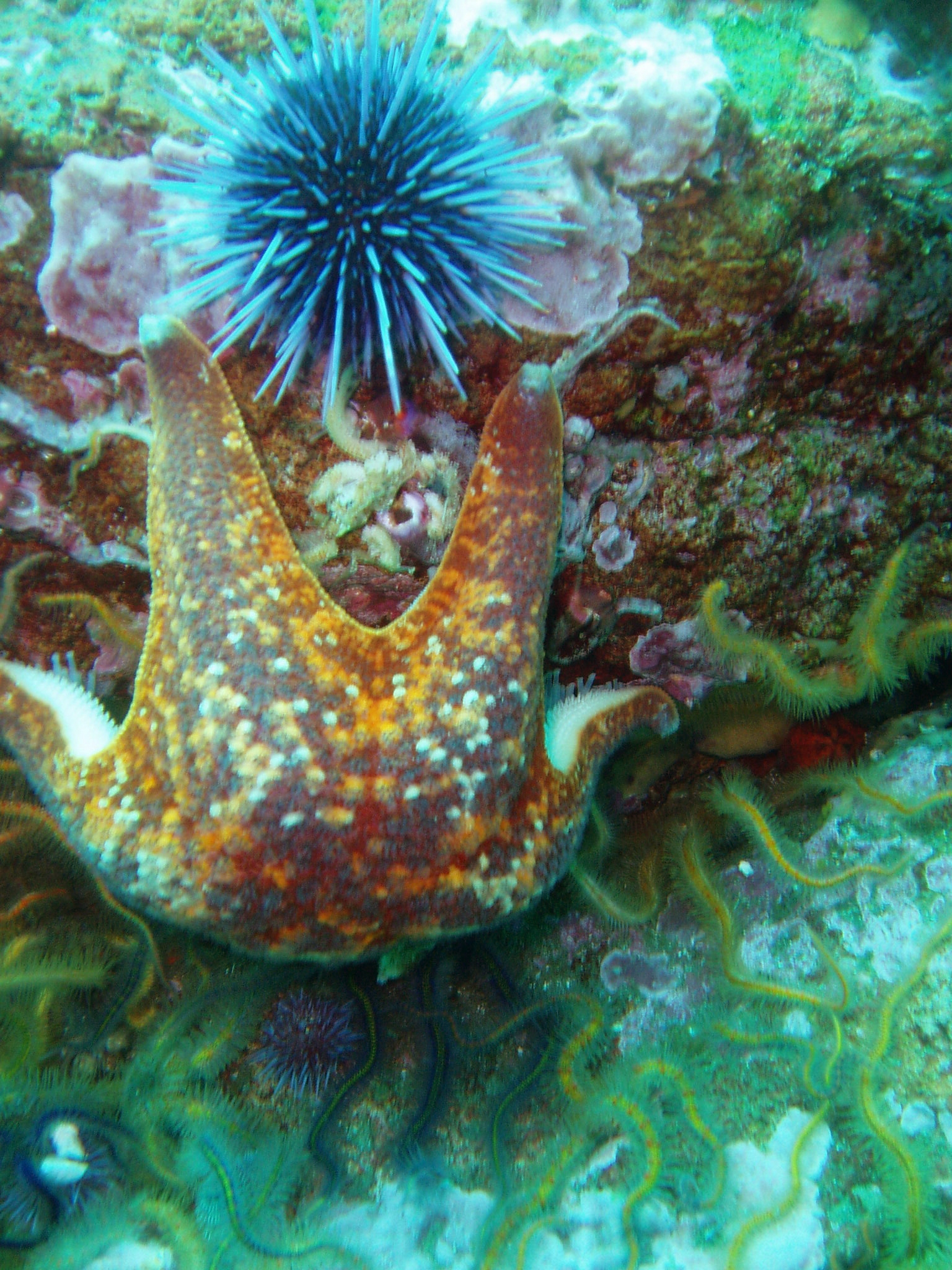
- A bat star and a purple sea urchin (Strongylocentrotus purpuratus)

Scientific classification
- Kingdom: Animalia
- Phylum: Echinodermata
- Class: Asteroidea
- Order: Valvatida
- Family: Asterinidae
- Genus: Patiria
- Species: P. miniata

Binomial name
- Patiria miniata (Brandt, 1835)

= Patiria miniata =

Bat star

Species of starfish

Patiria miniata, the bat star, sea bat, webbed star, or broad-disk star, is a species of sea star (also called a starfish) in the family Asterinidae. It typically has five arms, with the center disk of the animal being much wider than the stubby arms are in length. Although the bat star usually has five arms, it sometimes has as many as nine. Bat stars occur in many colors, including green, purple, red, orange, yellow and brown, either mottled or solid. The bat star gets its name from the webbing between its arms, which is said to resemble a bat's wings.

The bat star is usually found in the intertidal zone to a depth of 300 metres (980 ft). Its range extends from Sitka, Alaska to Baja California in the Pacific Ocean. It is most abundant along the Central Coast of California, usually residing in kelp forests due the consistent food source it provides.

== Classification ==
The genus of this species has transitioned back and forth between Asterina and Patiria since its inclusion in Fisher's 1911 North Pacific Asteroidea monograph. However, recent revisions based on molecular systematics have constrained Asterina and identified Patiria as a complex of three closely related species in the Pacific, including P. miniata, P. pectinifera in Asia and P. chilensis in South America.

== Anatomy ==
Bat stars can be many different types of colors. The bat star breathes through gill-like structures on its back that perform as respirators. It lacks the pincers or pedicellariae that most starfish use to clean the skin surface of debris, but its small, moving hairs or cilia may create enough of a water current to keep the surface of its skin clean. Bat stars also have an endoskeleton that is made up of vesicles that are under the star's tissues. It has visual sensors at the end of each ray that can detect light and note prey. To eat its prey, it covers the prey with its stomach and oozes digestive juices over it; this liquefies the food, enabling the bat star to ingest it. It is omnivorous, eating both plants and animals alive or dead.

Instead of a circulatory system since bat stars are echinoderms they have a water vascular system. This type of system allows them to be able to use their tube as well as move their food and waste. They also use the water vascular system as a part of their respiratory system. They pull water in using their madreporite (located on the top side of their body) and move it through their body using canals and muscular storage sacs.

== Reproduction ==
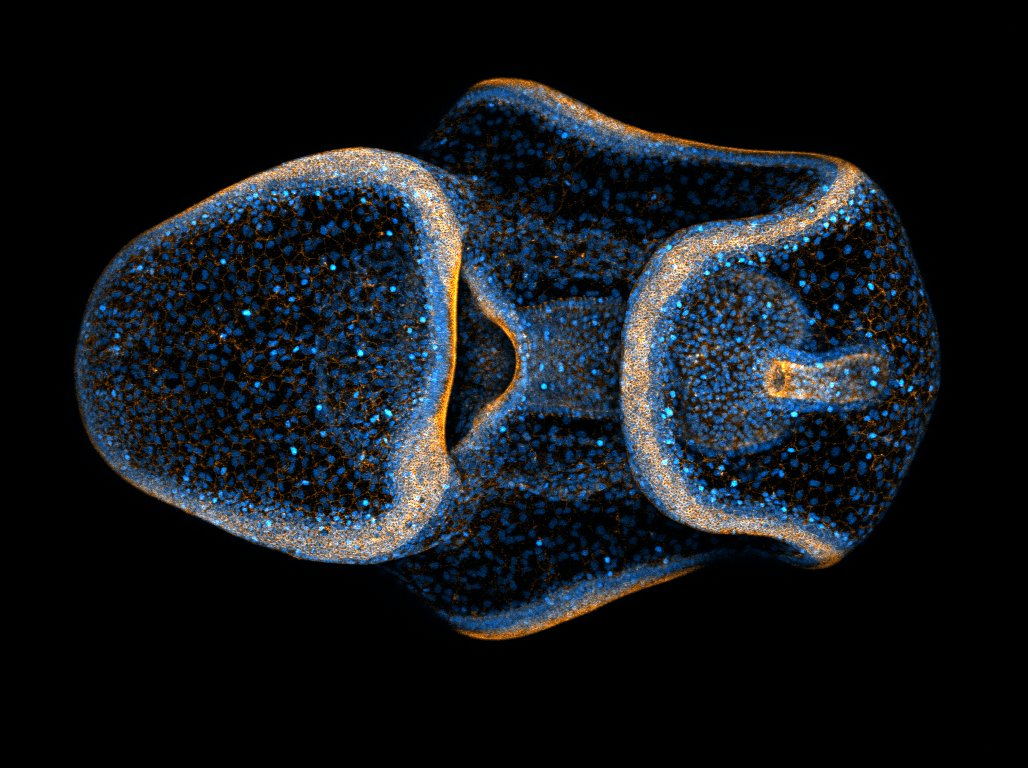
Bat star bipinnaria at fourth day of development photographed using confocal microscopy. Histones are labeled in blue, actin filaments in orange.

The bat stars reproduce through spawning. The male casts sperm and the female drops eggs; each has pores at the base of the rays for this purpose. The sperm and egg unite at sea and are carried away by ocean currents.

== Behavior ==
Bat stars may gently "fight" with each other if they meet. Fighting behavior consists of pushing and laying an arm over the other.

Bat stars are important as detritivores and scavengers, collecting algae and dead animals from the ocean floor. Their primary food source is algae, including seaweed and drifting algae, but they may also steal algae from sea urchins. Bryozoans are an incidental food source for the bat stars, and the bat stars have been observed to favour Tubulipora species in southern California.

Due to their diets of algae and dead animals bat stars are important contributors to keeping the ocean floor more clear and clean. Another symbiotic relationship bat stars have is with the polychaete worms (Ophiodromus pugettensis) that live in their arm groves on their mouth side. The worms live on the leftover bits of food that the stars feed on, this allows for as many as 20 worms to live on the bat star at one time.

Other than their relationship with worms bat stars are solitary animals. Their body can act as defense mechanisms in order to keep that solitary like using their arms to arm wrestle with any other organisms that encroach on their space, food, or other resources. In order to keep other animals from taking up a habitat on their body they also secret a mucus that deters them.

Juvenile bat stars live under rocks and boulders, while adults live out in the open. The largest adults can grow up to 20 centimetres (7.9 in) in diameter.

== Conservation ==
While bat stars are currently not evaluated on the IUCN Red List they still face threats to their population. Some of the threats the bat star population faces include the warming temperatures of the ocean caused by climate change. Warming temperature may be linked further to a condition called sea star wasting disease that is deadly to bat stars. Sea star wasting disease can spread quickly through population in one area making it very deadly and severe for the affected organism.
