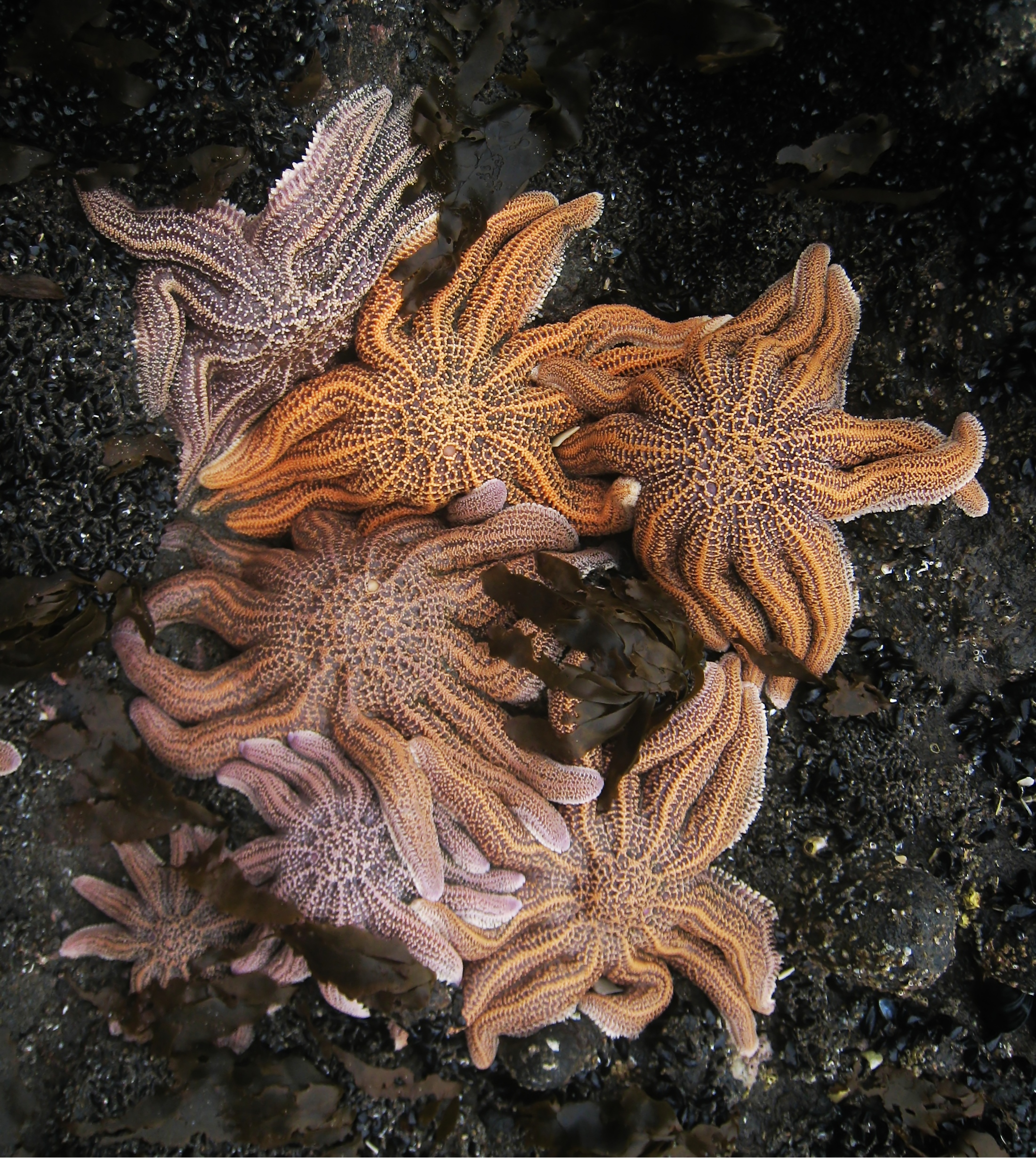

Scientific classification
- Kingdom: Animalia
- Phylum: Echinodermata
- Class: Asteroidea
- Order: Forcipulatida
- Family: Stichasteridae
- Genus: Stichaster
- Species: S. australis

Binomial name
- Stichaster australis (Verrill, 1871)

= Stichaster australis =

Species of starfish

Stichaster australis, the reef starfish, is a species of starfish found in the shallow waters of the rocky intertidal of New Zealand. Typically, the animal is endemic to the west coast shores of the North and South Islands, where wave action is increased. They do not usually inhabit ecosystems that have reduced wave action and calm conditions as they prefer a higher-energy environment. These marine invertebrates range in color from pink to purple, but can also be orange. They typically have eleven arms, but sometimes they may have either ten or twelve. As full-grown adults, they are 8 to 10 cm in diameter.

== Reproduction ==
The starfish engages in external fertilization in which the female releases the eggs and the male releases the sperm. Fertilization occurs in the water column. Its breeding season is the summer. During this time, male and female starfish can be found extremely close or even on top of one another. Consequently, spawning occurring several times from October through January.

== Life cycle ==
Stichaster australis, like the majority of other starfish, exhibits two life stages, planktonic and benthic. Once the eggs of the invertebrate are fertilized, bilaterally symmetrical planktonic larvae are formed. At this stage, these larvae are known as bipinnaria. The planktotrophic larval stage for S. australis will last about 6 months, with larvae typically settling any time from May through July. It is during this time that the larvae, now brachiolaria, enters the benthic phase of life. The brachiolaria will settle exclusively on the red algae Mesophyllum insigne, their only source of food until they mature. M. insigne can be found growing on both boulders and reefs located in the lower intertidal zone and subtidal zone. Both M. insigne and the juvenile starfish are limited to the lower levels of the ecosystems as they have low tolerances for desiccation.

== Growth and maturation ==
The starfish can begin the metamorphosis into an adult once its characteristic radial symmetry is developed. Right after metamorphosis, the critter has a diameter of about 0.85 mm. Initial growth of the starfish is slow until the addition of the 6th arm, but once that happens, the addition of new arms occurs more rapidly. Arm 7 will grow in between arms 6 and 1, arm 8 will grow in between arms 7 and 1, and arm 9 will grow in between arms 8 and 1, and so on. The growth of arms occurs in a clockwise pattern when viewing the animal aborally, the side containing the buttocks of the organism. The sea star will become sexually mature upon reaching size of about 5 to 8 cm in diameter.

== Diet ==
Juveniles, until reaching about 0.8 cm in diameter, when they are about 7 to 8 months old, feed purely on M. insigne. The starfish will remain at the M. insigne nursery for about a year. This coralline alga is rich in calcium which is beneficial for the young starfish and its skeletal growth. After this stage, the diet of S. australis shifts to include, but is not limited to, P. canaliculus. The starfish, as it increases in size to about 2 to 2.5 cm in diameter and begins to mature, will then solely feed on the mussels. The diet of this starfish during the adult stage consists mainly of Perna canaliculus, the New Zealand green mussel. This carnivorous shift in diet is consistent with a relocation from the nursery algal spaces to close reefs containing dense populations of P. canaliculus. The mussel beds ultimately become the permanent home for this invertebrate. In order to feed on the mussel, Stichaster australis utilizes its tubular feet to tug on the sides of the mussel's shell. Once the shell is broken, the starfish inserts its stomach to digest the innards of the prey. Once the sea star is finished digesting its prey, it will swallow its own stomach back into its own body. After feeding, the starfish will leave white marks on the mussel, a remnant of the predatory relationship.

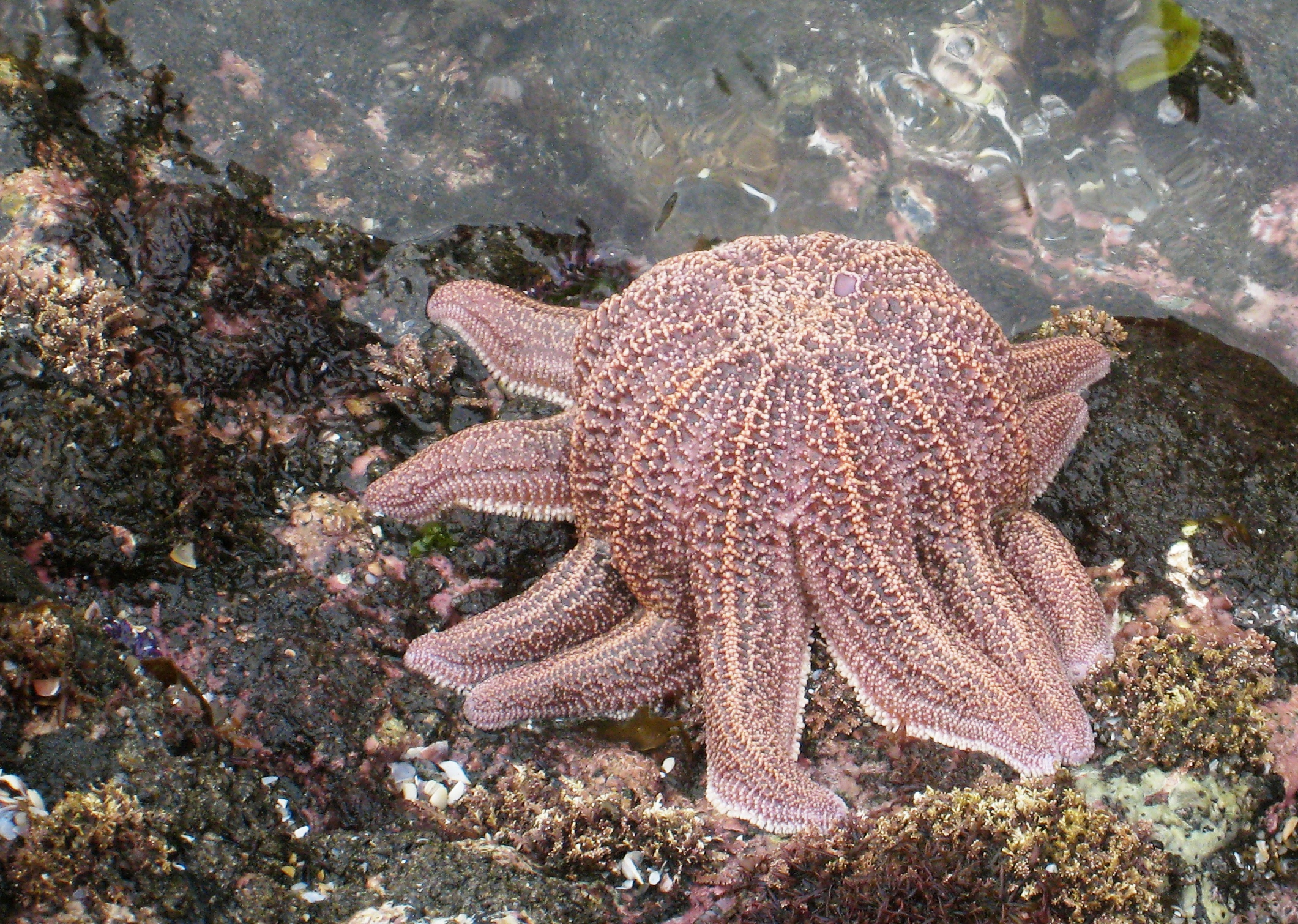
S. australis rising from the rock near Auckland

== Research ==
This predatory relationship between starfish and mussels in this intertidal zone was studied by Robert T. Paine in a paper published in 1971. The scientist removed S. australis from the ecosystem for 9 months. In this time, P. canaliculus, with the removal of its primary predator, was able to proliferate and increase its presence and hold in the ecosystem. When expanding their area within the intertidal, the mussels overgrew and outcompeted the other species, decreasing the species richness in the area from 20 species to 14 species. The mussels expanded its vertical distribution and 40% of the available space in the ecosystem was inhabited by these organisms. Paine proposed that S. australis is a keystone species of the rocky intertidal of New Zealand since it is responsible for maintaining not only the intertidal zonation, but the diversity of species within this ecosystem.
