= Larva =

Juvenile form of distinct animals before metamorphosis

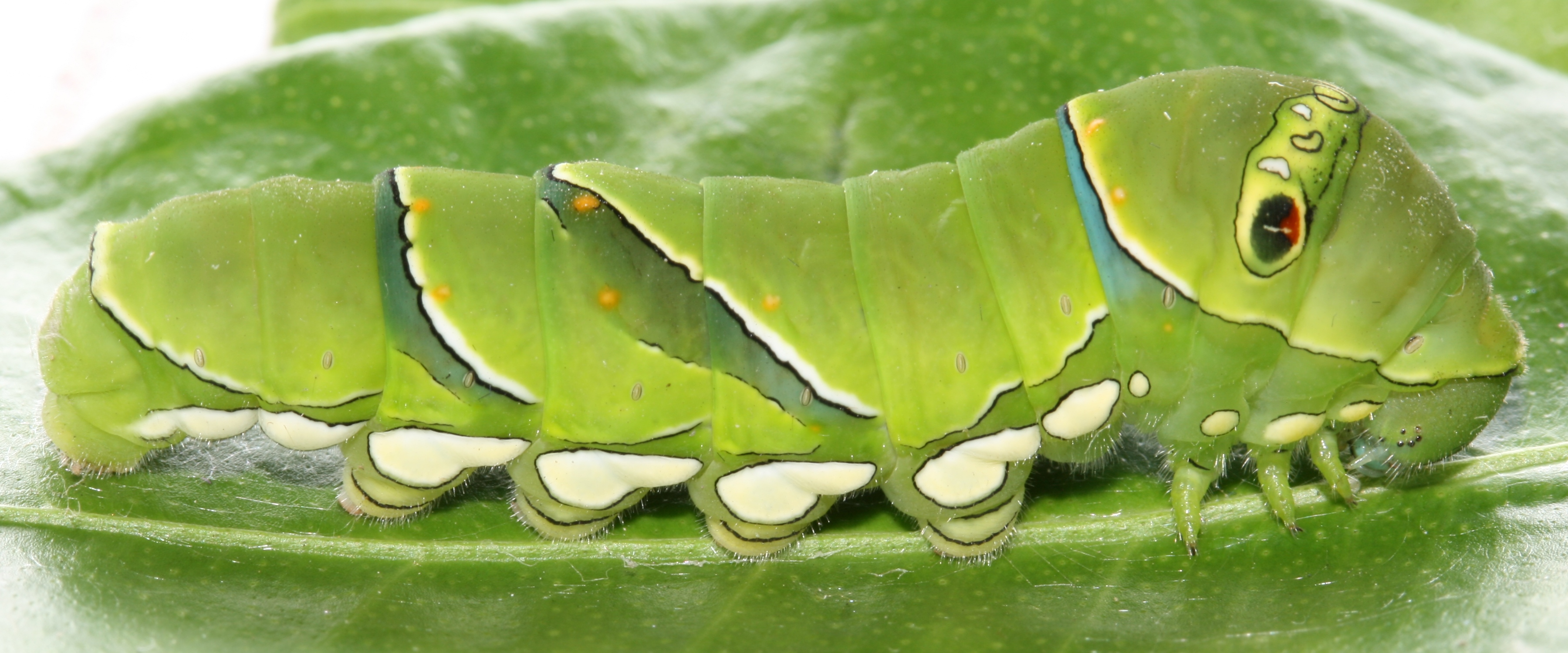
Larva of the Papilio xuthus butterfly

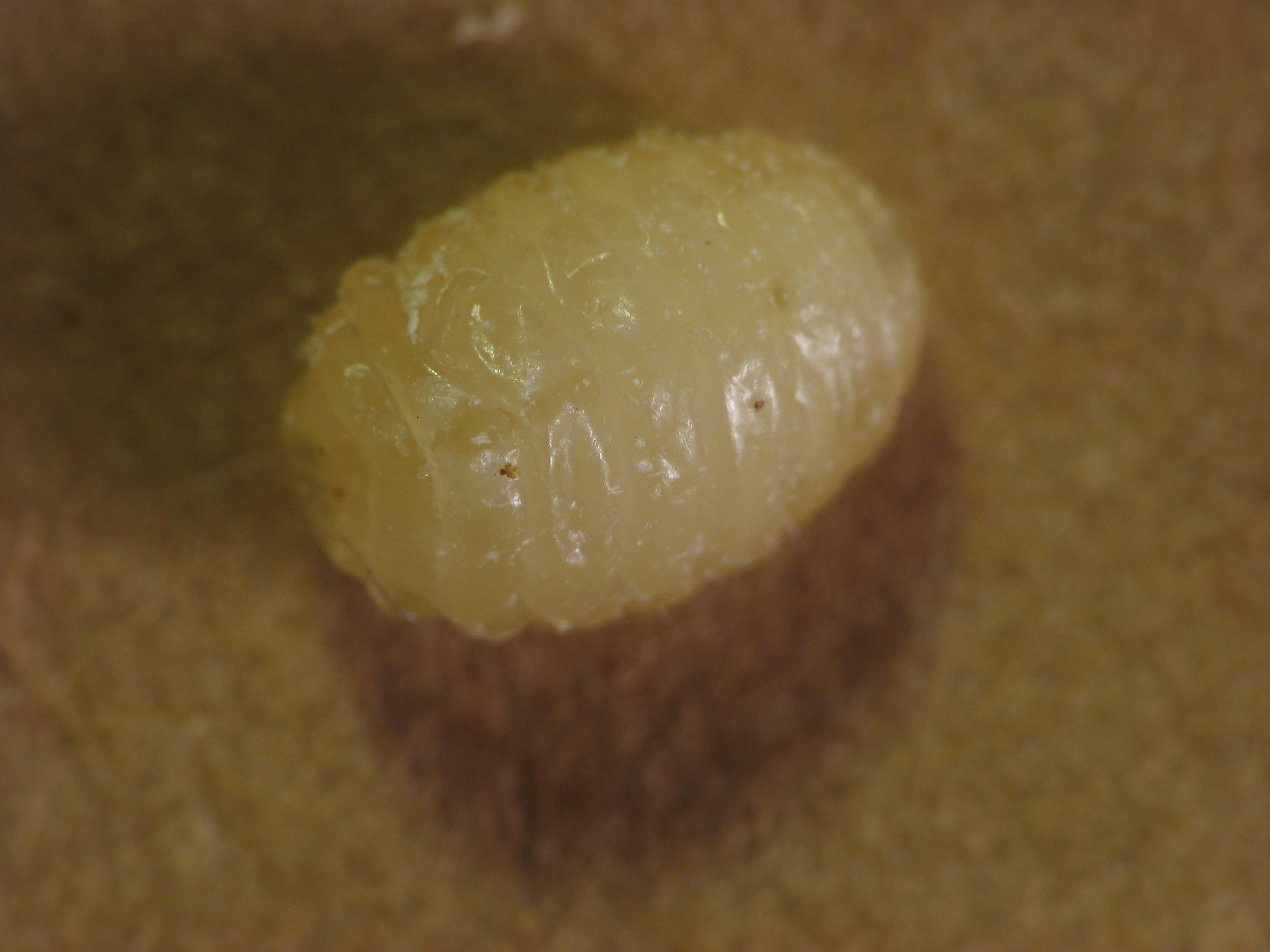
Eurosta solidaginis goldenrod gall fly larva

Disturbed beetle larva in Japan

A larva (/ˈlɑːrvə/; pl.: larvae /ˈlɑːrviː/) is a distinct juvenile form many animals undergo before metamorphosis into their next life stage. Animals with indirect development such as insects, some arachnids, amphibians, or cnidarians typically have a larval phase of their life cycle.

A larva's appearance is generally very different from the adult form (e.g. caterpillars and butterflies) including different unique structures and organs that do not occur in the adult form. Their diet may also be considerably different. In the case of smaller primitive arachnids, the larval stage differs by having three instead of four pairs of legs.

Larvae are frequently adapted to different environments than adults. For example, some larvae such as tadpoles live almost exclusively in aquatic environments but can live outside water as adult frogs. By living in a distinct environment, larvae may be given shelter from predators and reduce competition for resources with the adult population.

Animals in the larval stage will consume food to fuel their transition into the adult form. In some organisms (like polychaetes, barnacles, and sea squirts) adults are immobile but their larvae are mobile, and use their mobile larval form to distribute themselves. These larvae used for dispersal are either planktotrophic (feeding) or lecithotrophic (non-feeding).

Some larvae are dependent on adults to feed them. In many eusocial Hymenoptera species, the larvae are fed by female workers. In Ropalidia marginata (a paper wasp) the males are also capable of feeding larvae but they are much less efficient, spending more time and getting less food to the larvae.

The larvae of some organisms (for example, some salamanders such as the axolotl) can become pubescent and do not develop further into the adult form. This is a type of neoteny.

It is a misunderstanding that the larval form always reflects the group's evolutionary history. This could be the case, but often the larval stage has evolved secondarily, as in insects. In these cases, the larval form may differ more than the adult form from the group's common origins.

== Selected types of larvae ==
Animal	Name of larvae
Porifera (sponges)	coeloblastula (= blastula, amphiblastula), parenchymula (= parenchymella, stereogastrula)
Heterocyemida	Wagener's larva
Dicyemida	infusoriform larva
Cnidarians	planula (= stereogastrula), actinula
Ctenophora	cydippid larvae
Platyhelminthes	Turbellaria: Müller's larva, Götte's larva; Trematoda: miracidium, sporocyst, redia, cercaria; Monogenea: oncomiracidium; Cestoda: cysticercus, cysticercoid, oncosphere (or hexacanth), coracidium, plerocercoid
Annelida	nectochaete, polytroch
Nematoda	Dauer larva, microfilaria
Sipuncula	pelagosphera larva
Ectoprocta	cyphonautes, vesiculariform larvae
Nematomorpha	nematomorphan larva
Phoronids	actinotroch
Cycliophora	pandora, chordoid larva
Nemertea	pilidium, Iwata larva, Desor larva
Acanthocephala	acanthor
Locifera	Higgins larva
Brachiopoda	lobate larva
Priapula	loricate larva
Certain molluscs, annelids, nemerteans and sipunculids	trochophore
Certain molluscs	veliger
Mollusca: freshwater Bivalvia (mussels)	glochidium
Arthropoda: †Trilobita	protaspis (unjointed), meraspis (increasing number of joints, but 1 less than the holaspis), holaspis (=adult)
Arthropoda: Xiphosura	euproöps larva ("trilobite larva")
Arthropoda: Pycnogonida	protonymphon
Crustaceans	General: nauplius, metanauplius, protozoea, antizoea, pseudozoea, zoea, postlarva, cypris, primary larva, mysis Decapoda: zoea Rhizocephala: kentrogon
Insecta: Lepidoptera (butterflies and moths)	caterpillar
Insecta: Beetles	grub
Insecta: Flies, Bees, Wasps	maggot
Insecta: Mosquitoes	wriggler
Deuterostomes	dipleurula (hypothetical larva)
Echinodermata	bipinnaria, vitellaria, brachiollaria, pluteus, ophiopluteus, echinopluteus, auricularia
Hemichordata	tornaria
Urochordata	tadpole (does not feed, technically a "swimming embryo")
Fish (generally)	Ichthyoplankton
Fish: Petromyzontiformes (lamprey)	ammocoete
Fish: Anguilliformes (eels)	leptocephalus
Amphibians	tadpole, polliwog

== Insect larvae ==
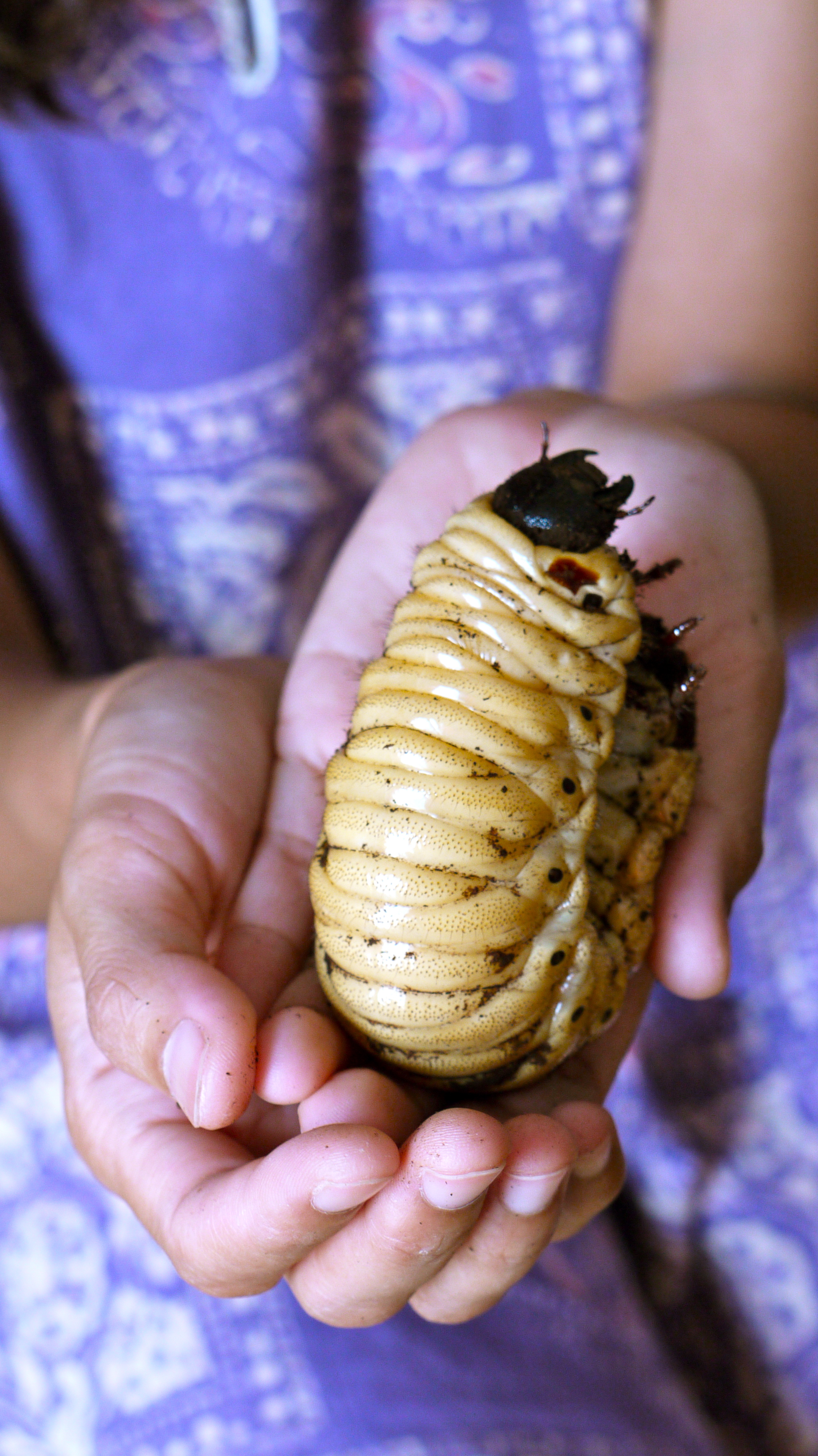
The larvae of the Hercules beetle (Dynastes hercules) are among the largest of any species of insect.

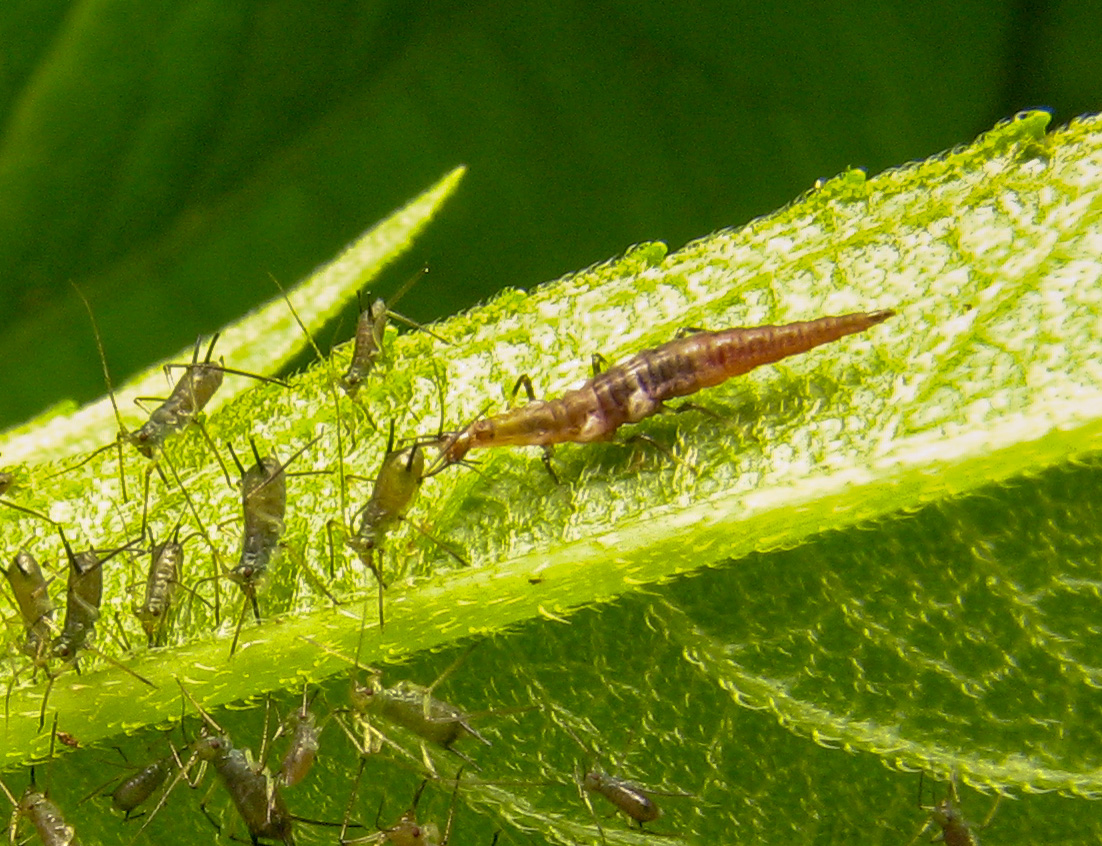
Campodeiform larva of Micromus sp.

Within Insects, only Endopterygotes show complete metamorphosis, including a distinct larval stage. Several classifications have been suggested by many entomologists, and the following classification is based on Antonio Berlese classification in 1913. There are four main types of endopterygote larvae types:

1. Apodous larvae – no legs at all and are poorly sclerotized. Based on sclerotization. All Apocrita are apodous. Three apodous forms are recognized.
  - Eucephalous – with well-sclerotized head capsule. Found in Nematocera, Buprestidae and Cerambycidae families.
  - Hemicephalus – with a reduced head capsule, retractable into the thorax. Found in Tipulidae and Brachycera families.
  - Acephalus – without head capsule. Found in Cyclorrhapha
2. Protopod larvae – larvae have many different forms and often are unlike a normal insect form. They hatch from eggs which contain very little yolk. E.g. first instar larvae of parasitic hymenoptera.
3. Polypod larvae – also known as eruciform larvae, these larvae have abdominal prolegs, in addition to usual thoracic legs. They are poorly sclerotized and relatively inactive. They live in close contact with their food. The best example is the caterpillars of lepidopterans.
4. Oligopod larvae – have well-developed head capsules and mouthparts that are similar to adult, but without compound eyes. They have six legs. No abdominal prolegs. Two types can be seen:
  - Campodeiform – well sclerotized, dorso-ventrally flattened body. Usually long-legged predators with prognathous mouthparts. (lacewings, trichopterans, mayflies and some coleopterans).
  - Scarabeiform – poorly sclerotized, flat thorax and abdomen. Usually short-legged and inactive burrowing forms. (Scarabaeoidea and other coleopterans).

== See also ==
- Crustacean larvae
- Ichthyoplankton
- Maggots
- Spawn (biology)
- Non-larval animal juvenile (immature) stages and other life cycle stages:
  - In Porifera: olynthus, gemmule
  - In Cnidaria: ephyra, scyphistoma, strobila, gonangium, hydranth, polyp, medusa
  - In Mollusca: paralarva, young cephalopods
  - In Platyhelminthes: hydatid cyst
  - In Bryozoa: avicularium
  - In Acanthocephala: cystacanth
  - In Insecta:
    - Nymphs and naiads, immature forms in hemimetabolous insects
    - Subimago, a juvenile that resembles the adult in Ephemeroptera
    - Instar, intermediate between each ecdysis
    - Pupa and chrysalis, intermediate stages between larva and imago (the adult stage)
- Protozoan life cycle stages
  - Apicomplexan life cycle
- Algal life cycle stages:
  - Codiolum-phase
  - Conchocelis-phase
- Marine larval ecology

== Bibliography ==
- Brusca, R. C. & Brusca, G. J. (2003). Invertebrates (2nd ed.). Sunderland, Mass. : Sinauer Associates.
- Hall, B. K. & Wake, M. H., eds. (1999). The Origin and Evolution of Larval Forms. San Diego: Academic Press.
- Leis, J. M. & Carson-Ewart, B. M., eds. (2000). The Larvae of Indo-Pacific Coastal Fishes. An Identification Guide to Marine Fish Larvae. Fauna Malesiana handbooks, vol. 2. Brill, Leiden.
- Minelli, A. (2009). The larva. In: Perspectives in Animal Phylogeny and Evolution. Oxford University Press. p. 160–170. link.
- Shanks, A. L. (2001). An Identification Guide to the Larval Marine Invertebrates of the Pacific Northwest. Oregon State University Press, Corvallis. 256 pp.
- Smith, D. & Johnson, K. B. (1977). A Guide to Marine Coastal Plankton and Marine Invertebrate Larvae. Kendall/Hunt Plublishing Company.
- Stanwell-Smith, D., Hood, A. & Peck, L. S. (1997). A field guide to the pelagic invertebrates larvae of the maritime Antarctic. British Antarctic Survey, Cambridge.
- Thyssen, P.J. (2010). Keys for Identification of Immature Insects. In: Amendt, J. et al. (ed.). Current Concepts in Forensic Entomology, chapter 2, pp. 25–42. Springer: Dordrecht.
