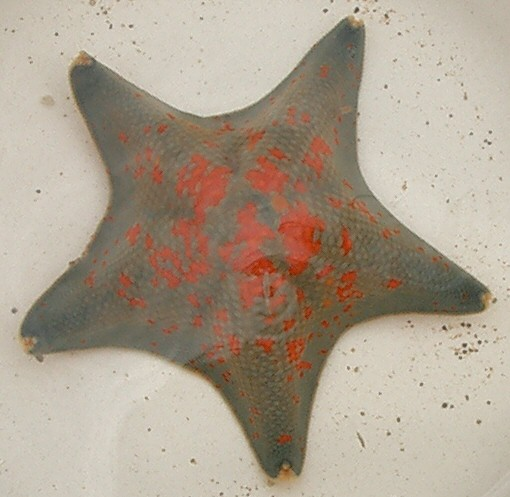

Scientific classification
- Kingdom: Animalia
- Phylum: Echinodermata
- Class: Asteroidea
- Order: Valvatida
- Family: Asterinidae
- Genus: Patiria
- Species: P. pectinifera

Binomial name
- Patiria pectinifera (Müller & Troschel, 1842)

Synonyms
- Asterina pectinifera (Muller & Troschel, 1842); Asteriscus pectinifera Müller & Troschel, 1842

= Patiria pectinifera =

Species of starfish

Patiria pectinifera, the blue bat star, is a species of starfish in the family Asterinidae. It is found in the northern Pacific Ocean along the coasts of Japan, China and Russia. It is used as a model organism in developmental biology.

== Taxonomy ==
In literature, this species is often referred to Asterina pectinifera; the accepted name is now Patiria pectinifera.

== Distribution and habitat ==
Patiria pectinifera is native to the Sea of Japan, East China Sea and the Yellow Sea. It is also found along the coast of the Russian Federation from Posyet Bay as far as the Strait of Tartary and the southern part of Sakhalin. It is found in the shallow subtidal zone on stony seabeds and other substrates down to depths of 40 metres (130 ft).

== Biology ==
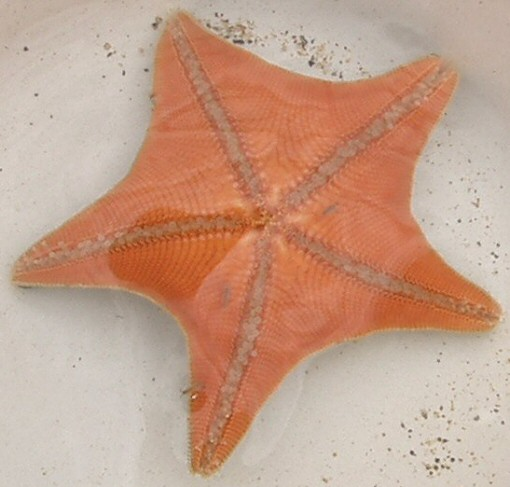
Underside of Patiria pectinifera

Patiria pectinifera feeds on algae and sea grasses, detritus and small invertebrates. It prefers living on coarse sediment to fine sediment and everts its stomachs over a food item to digest it in situ. Patiria pectinifera may be preyed on by the carnivorous starfish Luidia quinaria. In Peter the Great Gulf, this starfish breeds twice a year, in the autumn and the spring. Females spawn about 500,000 eggs each year.

Patiria pectinifera has been used as a model organism in developmental biology. The advantages it has for this purpose are that it is common, easy to collect, and easy to maintain in the laboratory. Both adults and larvae are tolerant of a range of conditions and the adults are non-specialist feeders. The chunky body shape makes them easy to handle and wounds heal well; individuals recover easily from surgery and can be used repeatedly for further experiments. The oocytes are large and transparent and remain viable when removed from the gonads. They have been used for studies of oocyte maturation, fertilization, and larval development.

It has been shown that if the embryo of this starfish is dissociated into its constituent cells, a collection of these cells is capable of re-aggregation into a viable bipinnaria larva. First the external epithelium is formed, then the internal structures develop. After this gastrulation occurs by invagination followed by the development of a mouth. A relaxin-like peptide, previously referred to as "Gonad Stimulating Substance", has also been found in this starfish. There is evidence that the peptide is involved in reproductive processes and functions via a G protein-coupled receptor, which supports its relatedness to vertebrate relaxins.
