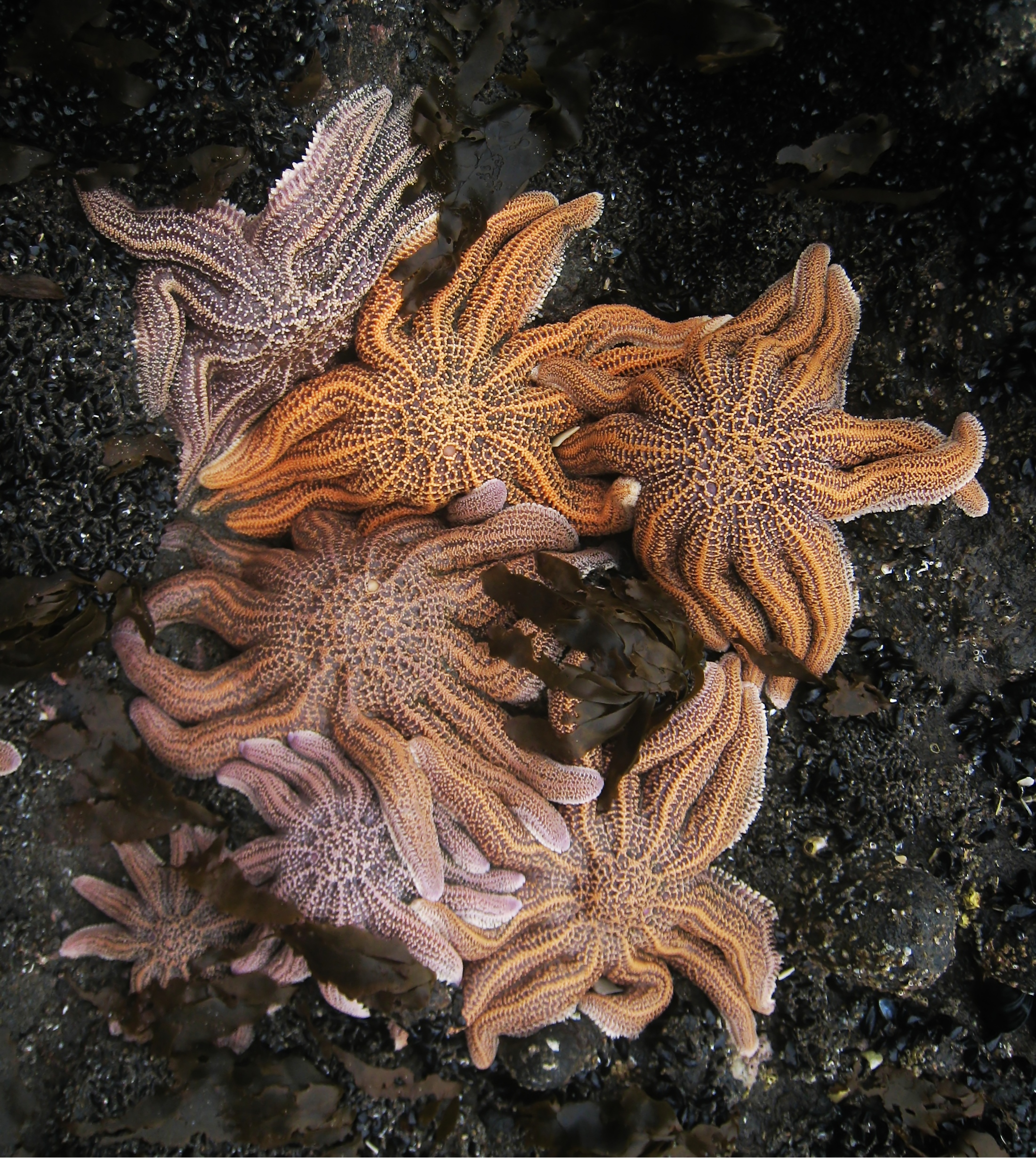
- Stichaster australis

Scientific classification
- Kingdom: Animalia
- Phylum: Echinodermata
- Class: Asteroidea
- Order: Forcipulatida
- Family: Stichasteridae
- Genus: Stichaster; Müller & Troschel, 1840

Synonyms
- Coelasterias Verrill, 1867; Tonia Gray, 1840

= Stichaster =

Genus of starfishes

Stichaster is a genus of sea stars in the family Stichasteridae.

== Species ==
Accepted Species:

Image	Scientific name	Distribution
	Stichaster australis (Verrill, 1871)	New Zealand
	Stichaster striatus (Müller & Troschel, 1840)	Southeastern Pacific Ocean, along the coast of South America
