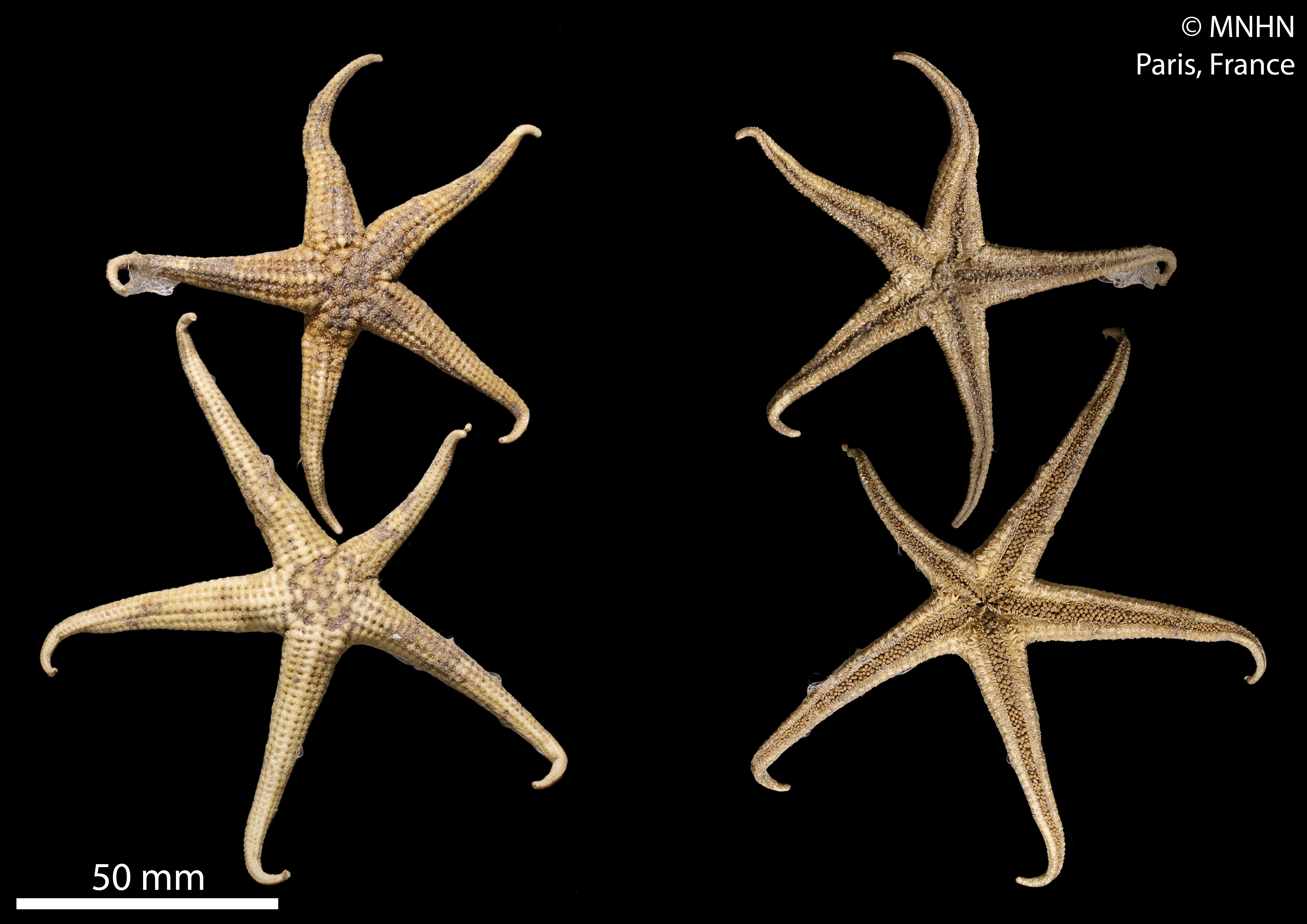
- Neomorphaster margaritaceus

Scientific classification
- Kingdom: Animalia
- Phylum: Echinodermata
- Class: Asteroidea
- Order: Forcipulatida
- Family: Stichasteridae
- Genus: Neomorphaster; Sladen, 1889

= Neomorphaster =

Genus of echinoderms

Neomorphaster is a genus of echinoderms belonging to the family Stichasteridae.

The species of this genus are found in Atlantic Ocean.

Species:

- Neomorphaster forcipatus Verrill, 1894
- Neomorphaster margaritaceus (Perrier, 1882)
