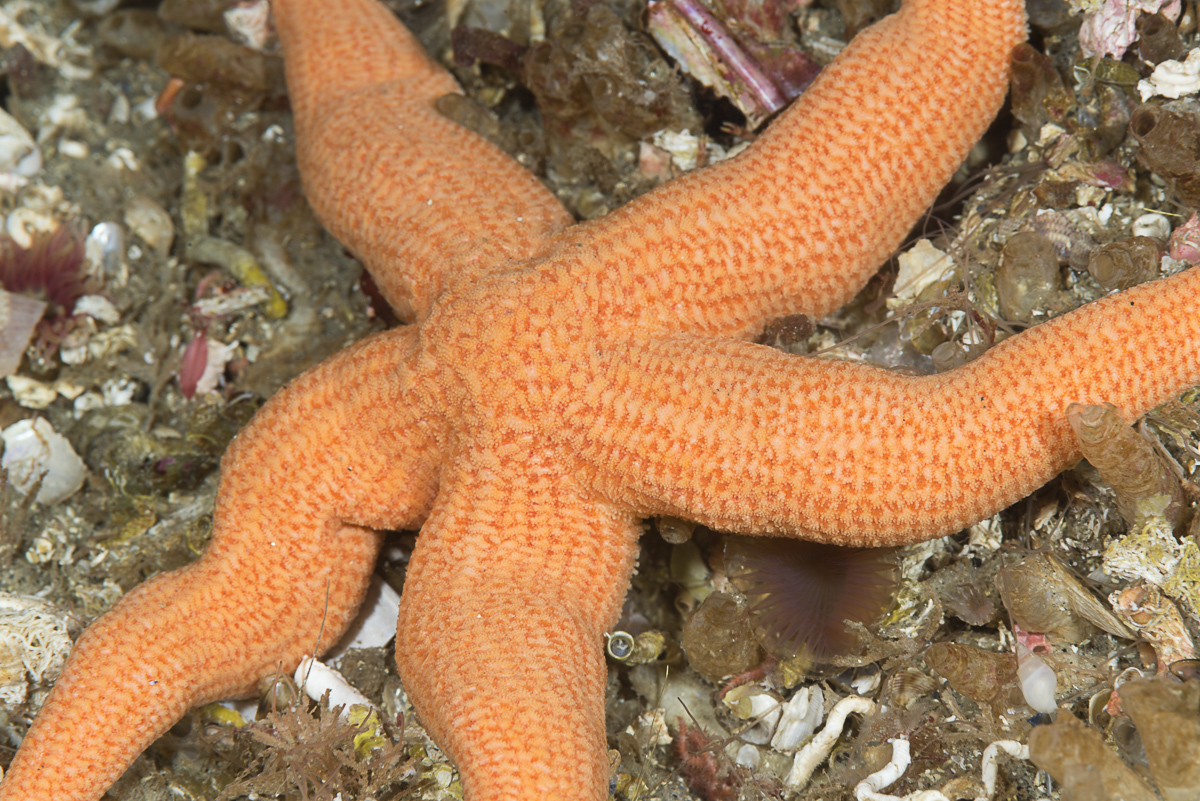

Scientific classification
- Domain: Eukaryota
- Kingdom: Animalia
- Phylum: Echinodermata
- Class: Asteroidea
- Order: Forcipulatida
- Family: Stichasteridae
- Genus: Stichastrella
- Species: S. rosea

Binomial name
- Stichastrella rosea (O.F. Müller, 1776)

Synonyms
- Asteracanthion rosea (O.F. Müller, 1776); Asterias rosea O.F. Müller, 1776; Chaetaster hermanni Müller & Troschel, 1842; Cribrella rosea (O.F. Müller, 1776); Linckia rosea (O.F. Müller, 1776); Stichaster arcticus Danielssen & Koren, 1883; Stichaster roseus (O.F. Müller, 1776)

= Stichastrella rosea =

Species of starfish

Stichastrella rosea, the rosy starfish, is a species of starfish found in the northeast Atlantic.
