= Bipinnaria =

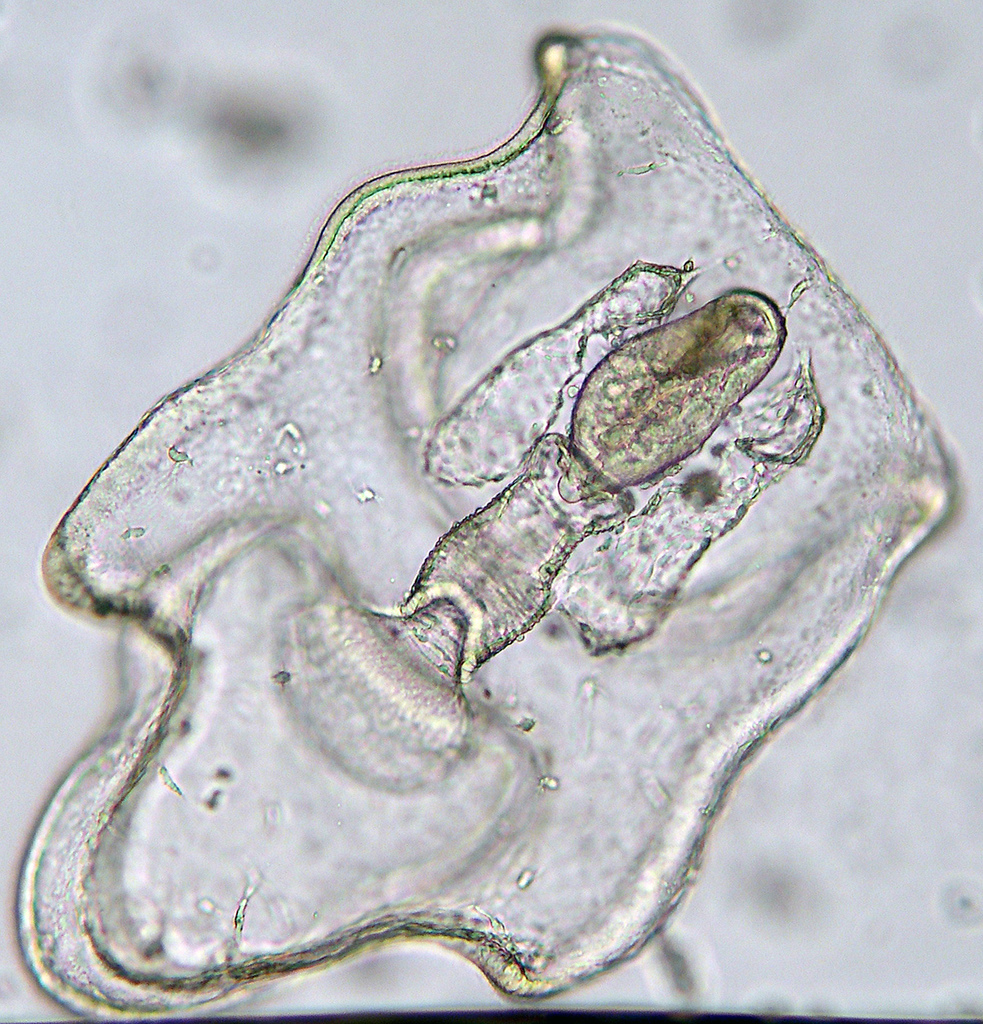
Bipinnaria larva

A bipinnaria is the first stage in the larval development of most starfish, and is usually followed by a brachiolaria stage. Movement and feeding is accomplished by the bands of cilia. Starfish that brood their young generally lack a bipinnaria stage, with the eggs developing directly into miniature adults.

The bipinnaria is free-living, swimming as part of the zooplankton. When it initially forms, the entire body is covered by cilia, but as it grows, these become confined to a narrow band forming a number of loops over the body surface. A pair of short, stubby arms soon develop on the body, with the ciliated bands extending into them.

In addition to propelling the larva through the water, the cilia also catch suspended food particles, and deliver them to the mouth (more correctly called a stomodeum).

Eventually, three additional arms develop at the front end of the larva; at this point it becomes a brachiolaria. In some species, including the common starfish Asterias, the bipinnaria develops directly into an adult.

It is very similar in appearance to the tornaria larvae of some Hemichordata, reflecting the descent of the Ambulacraria from a common ancestor.

== Gallery ==
Illustration of an asterias bipinnaria larva by Ernst Haeckel

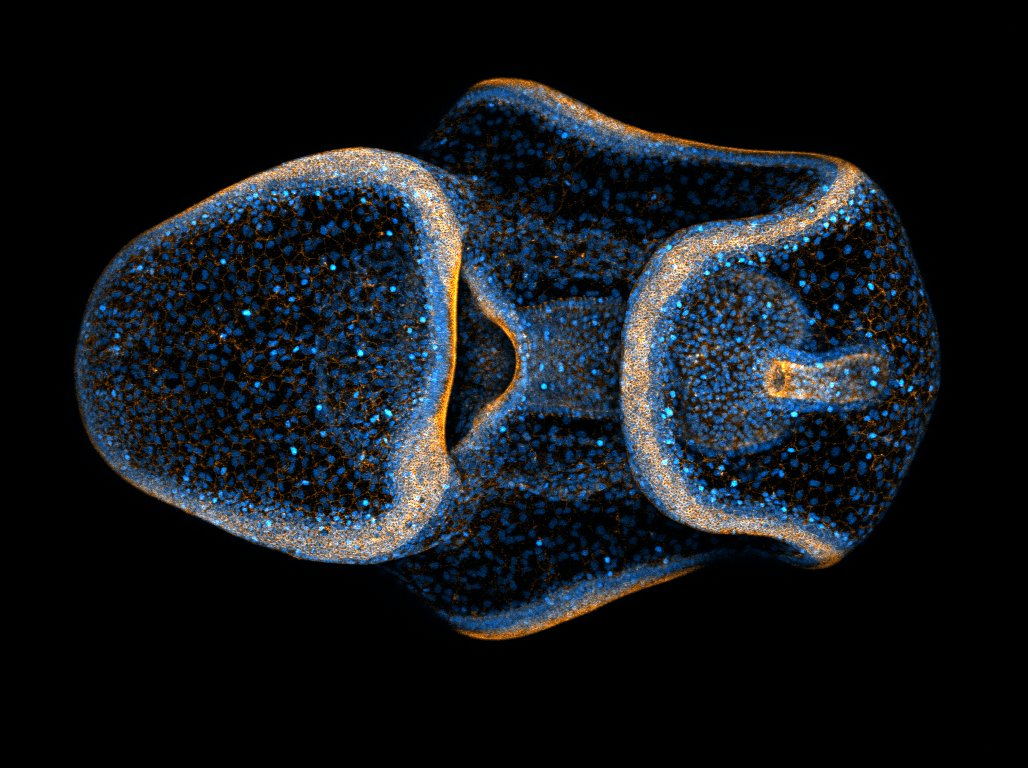
Confocal microscopy photograph of a bat star bipinnaria by Natalie Carrigan

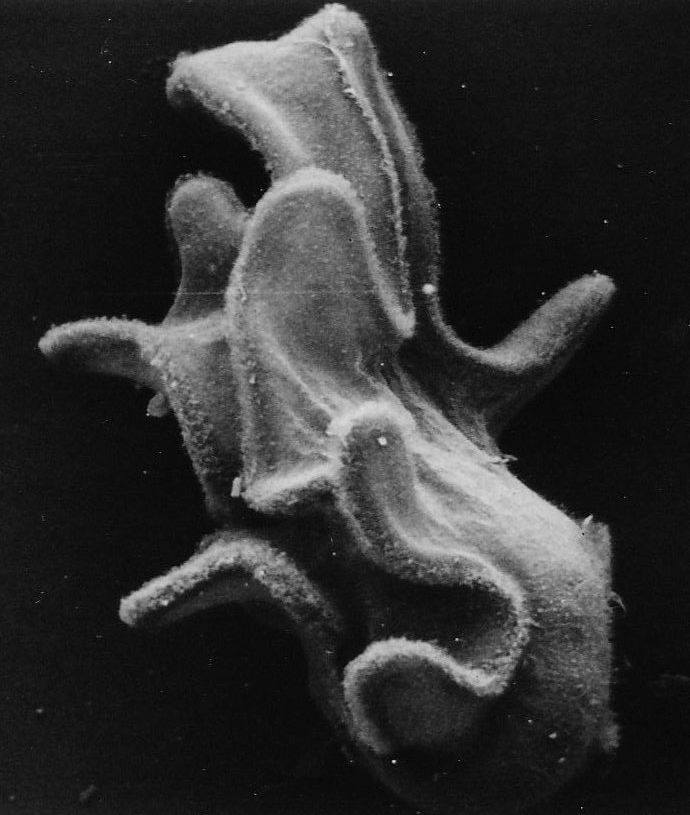
electron microscope image of a crown of thorns

Color photograph of an unknown species of bipinnaria by Marija Gajić
