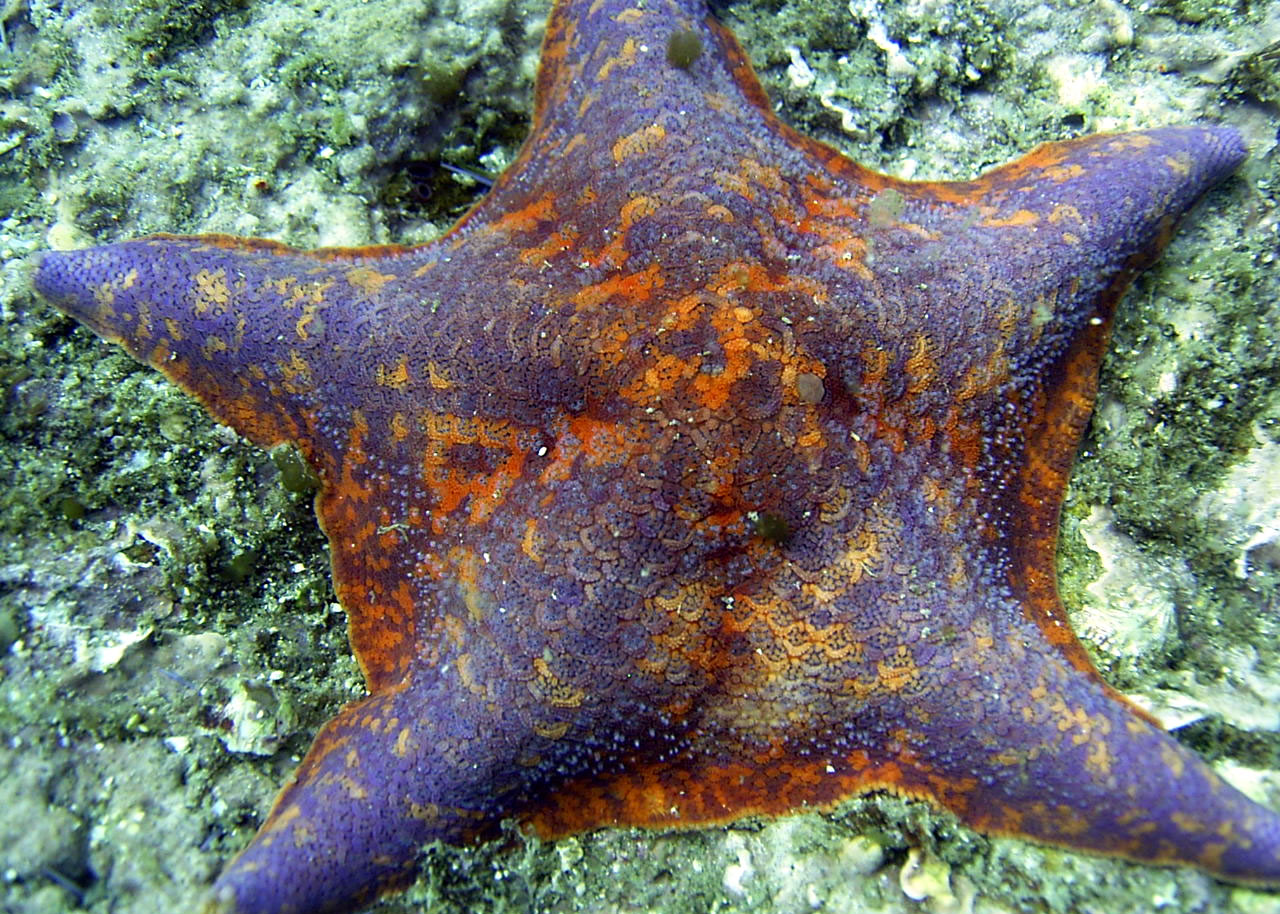
- Patiria miniata

Scientific classification
- Kingdom: Animalia
- Phylum: Echinodermata
- Class: Asteroidea
- Order: Valvatida
- Family: Asterinidae
- Genus: Patiria; Gray, 1840

Type species
- Patiria coccinea Gray, 1840

Species
- 3 species (see text)

Synonyms
- Enoplopatiria Verrill, 1913

= Patiria =

Genus of starfishes

Patiria is a genus of starfish in the family Asterinidae from the Pacific Ocean, which are commonly known as bat stars.

== Species ==
Patiria contains the following species:

Image	Scientific name	Common name	Distribution
	Patiria chilensis (Lutken, 1859)	Chilean bat star	southeast Pacific
	Patiria miniata (Brandt, 1835)	sea bat, webbed star, and broad-disk star	northeast Pacific
	Patiria pectinifera (Muller & Troschel, 1842)	blue bat star	northwest Pacific
