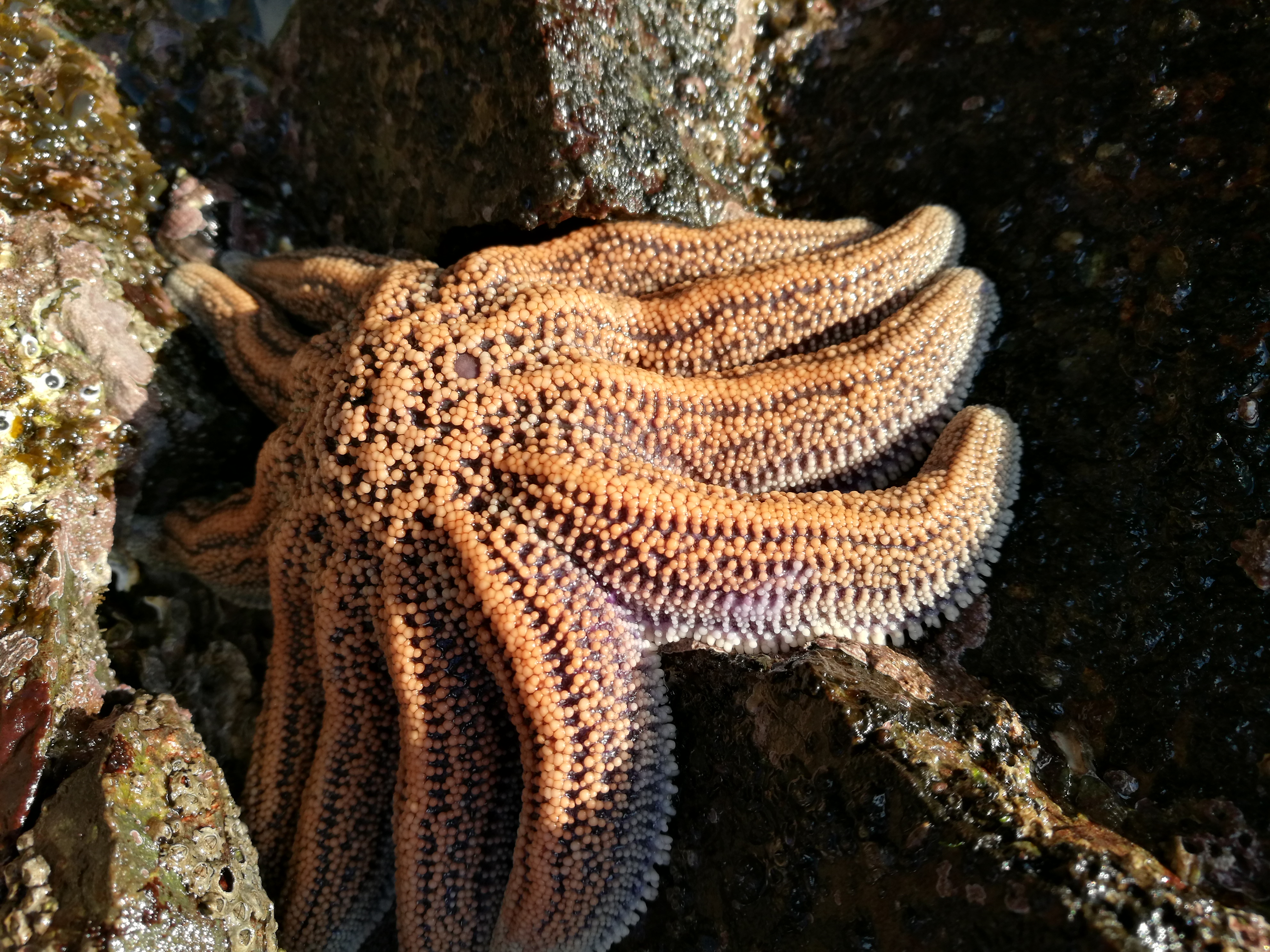
- Stichaster australis, New Zealand

Scientific classification
- Kingdom: Animalia
- Phylum: Echinodermata
- Class: Asteroidea
- Order: Forcipulatida
- Family: Stichasteridae; Perrier, 1885

Genera
- 9 genera, see text

Synonyms
- Neomorphasteridae Fisher, 1923

= Stichasteridae =

Family of starfishes

The Stichasteridae are a small family of Asteroidea (sea stars) in the order Forcipulatida. Genera were formerly unassigned, or in the family Asteriidae.

== Genera ==
The World Register of Marine Species lists these genera within the family Stichasteridae:

- Allostichaster Verrill, 1914
- Cosmasterias Sladden, 1889
- Granaster Perrier, 1894
- Neomorphaster Sladden, 1889
- Neosmilaster Fisher, 1930
- Pseudechinaster H.E.S. Clark, 1962
- Smilasterias Sladden, 1889
- Stichaster Muller & Troschel, 1840
- Stichastrella Verrill, 1914
- Uniophora Gray, 1840
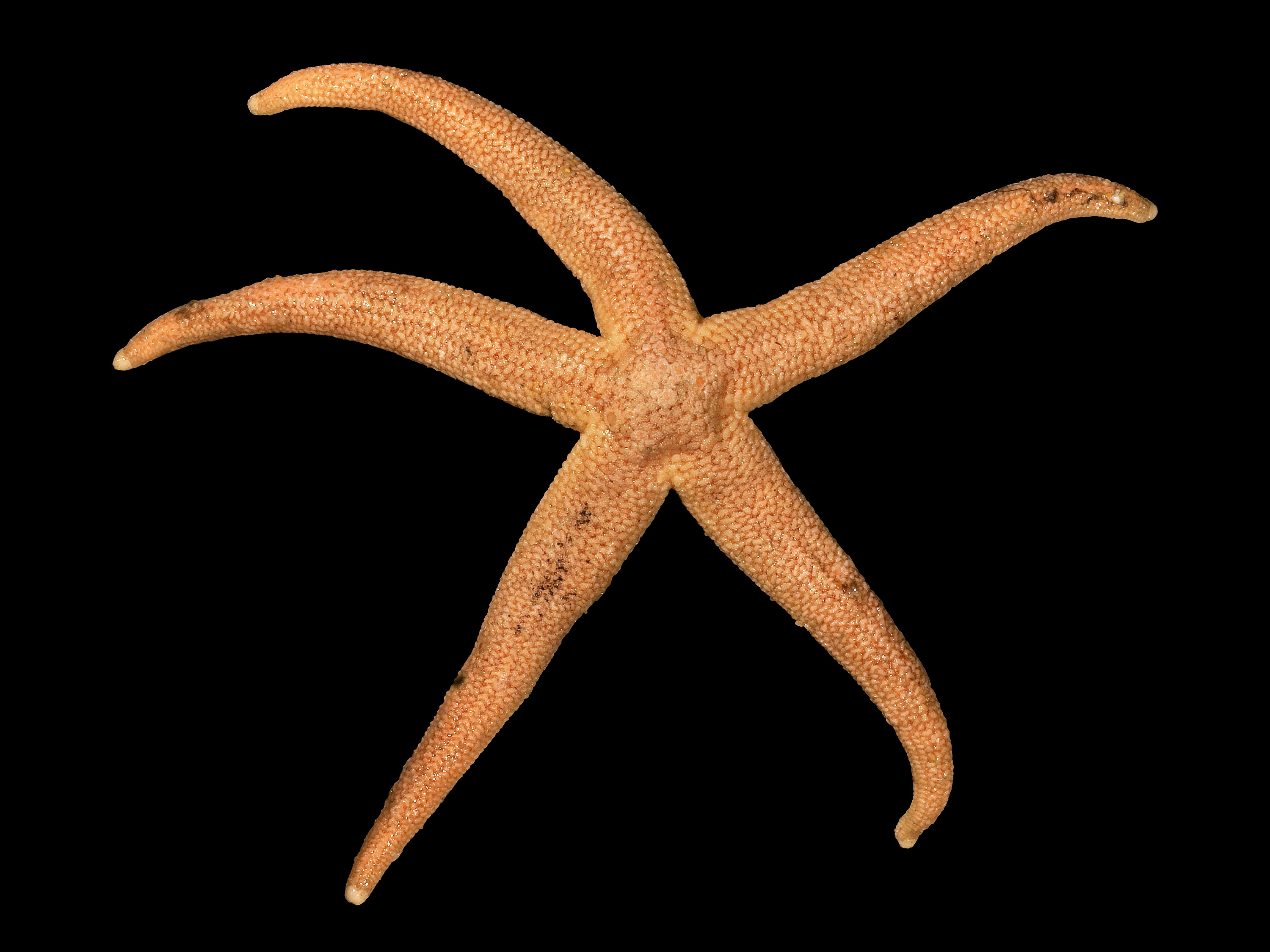
Stichastrella rosea

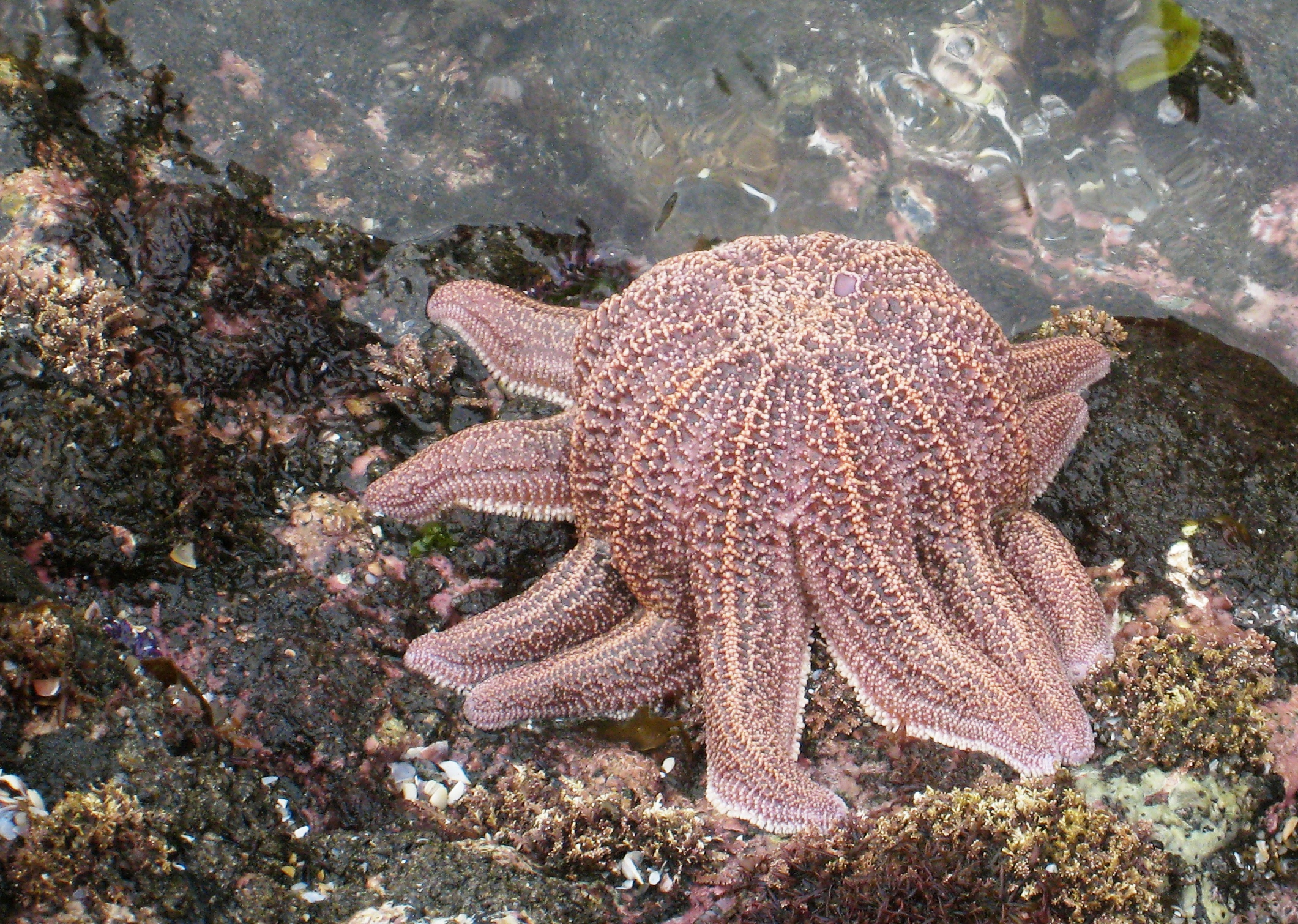
Stichaster australis
