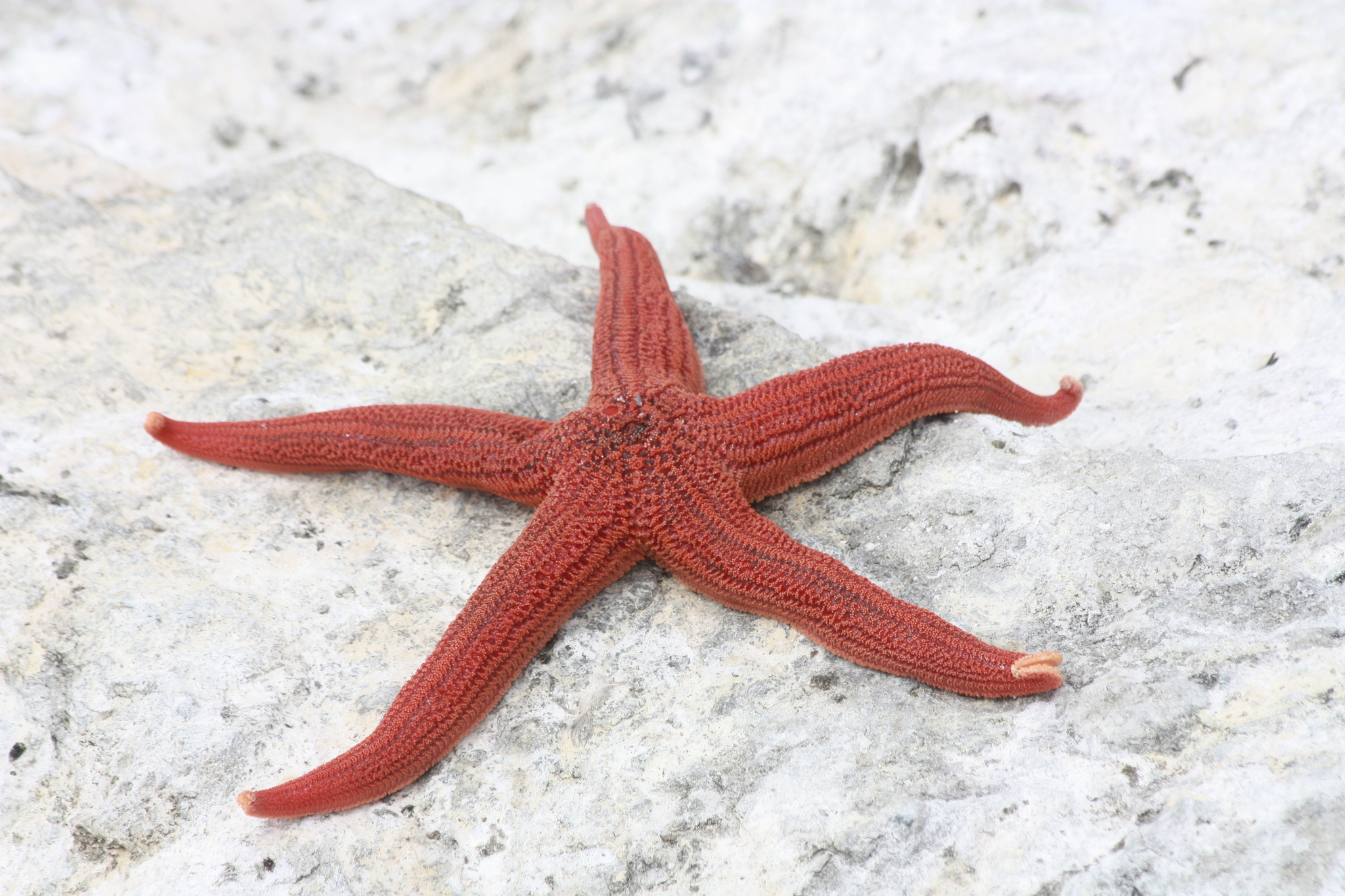

Scientific classification
- Kingdom: Animalia
- Phylum: Echinodermata
- Class: Asteroidea
- Order: Forcipulatida
- Family: Stichasteridae
- Genus: Stichaster
- Species: S. striatus

Binomial name
- Stichaster striatus Müller & Troschel, 1840

Synonyms
- Asteracanthion aurantiacus Müller & Troschel, 1842; Asterias aurantiacus Meyen, 1834; Stichaster aurantiacus (Meyen, 1834); Tonia atlantica Gray, 1840; Tonia aurantiaca (Verrill, 1870)

= Stichaster striatus =

Species of echinoderm

Stichaster striatus, the common light striated star, is a species of starfish in the family Stichasteridae, found in the southeastern Pacific Ocean. It was first described by the German zoologists Johannes Peter Müller and Franz Hermann Troschel in 1840.

== Distribution and habitat ==
Stichaster striatus is native to the southeastern Pacific Ocean, along the coast of South America. It occurs on rocky and sandy seabeds and among kelp in intertidal areas, with a maximum depth of 80 m (260 ft).

== Ecology ==
This starfish is gregarious and a predator. Although it has been recorded in Chile as feeding on twenty-eight different species of invertebrate, the majority of these were sessile organisms. It was not found to engage in cannibalism of its own species or to feed on other species of starfish. Many individuals were found to have missing or regenerating arms. This is likely the result of attacks by the dominant predatory starfish in the region Meyenaster gelatinosus and Luidia magellanica. Starfish with missing arms are likely to have a certain minimum size; this is because, if they are too small, they are entirely devoured by the predator which attacked them. Juvenile S. striatus are found among the holdfasts of the kelp Lessonia nigrescens or hiding in crevices or under boulders.

== Research ==
It has been found that an aqueous extract of S. striatus, when fed to rats with a genetic disposition to consume alcohol to excess, reduced their voluntary intake of alcohol. This line of research was inspired by an oral tradition that Jesuit property-owners in South America in the 17th and 18th century fed "starfish soup" to their workers to encourage sobriety.
