= Tornaria =

Type of planktonic larva

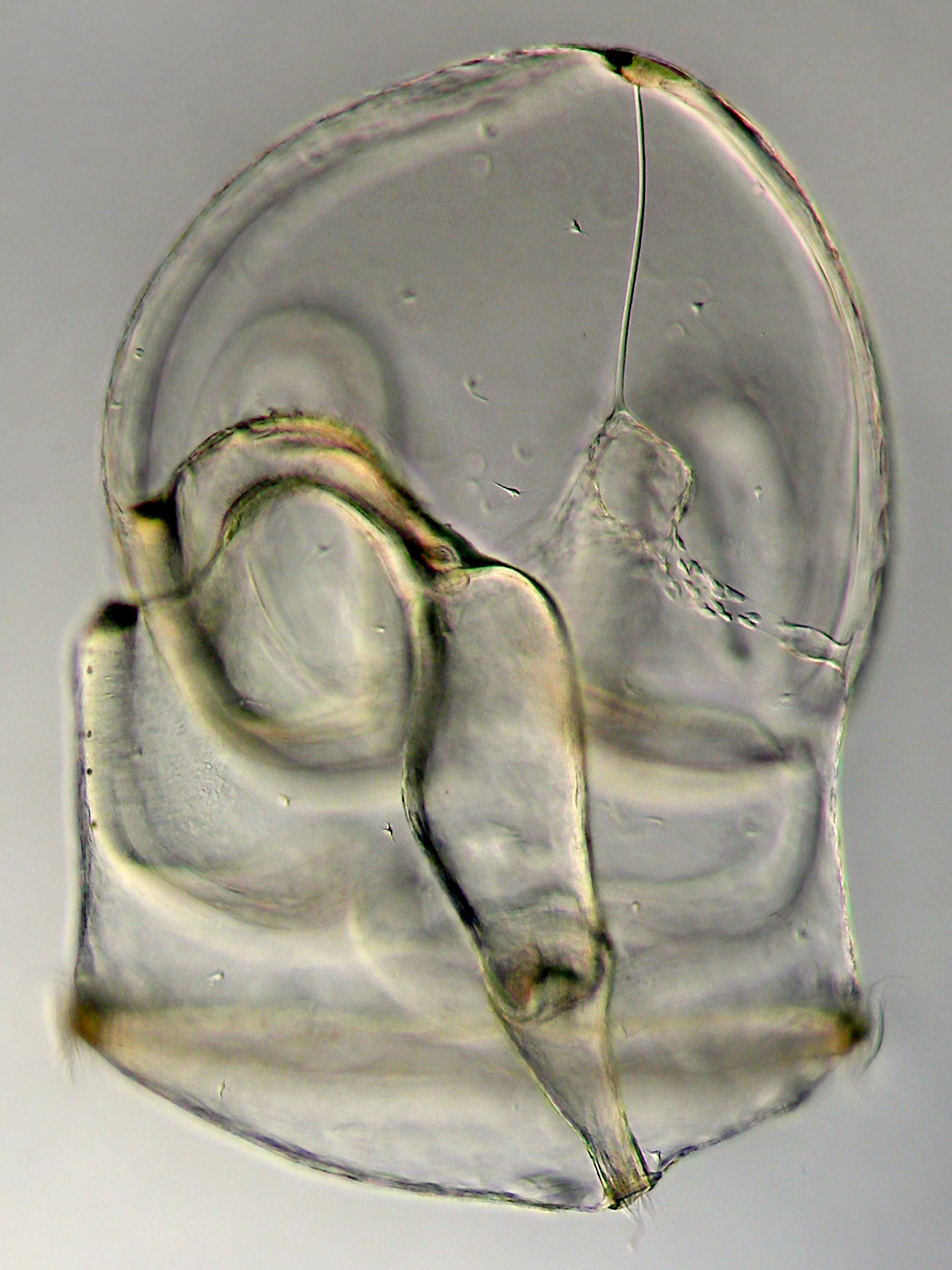
A tornaria larva

A tornaria is the planktonic larva of some species of Hemichordata such as the acorn worms. It is very similar in appearance to the bipinnaria larvae of starfishes, with convoluted bands of cilia running around the body. It is an oval shaped, transparent larva. The diameter of the body is about 3 mm. It has an apical plate, which is a thickened region provided by a tuft of cilia and a pair of eye spots. The larva has a complete alimentary canal. The ciliary band stretches throughout the anterior and posterior region, and also the postoral region.
