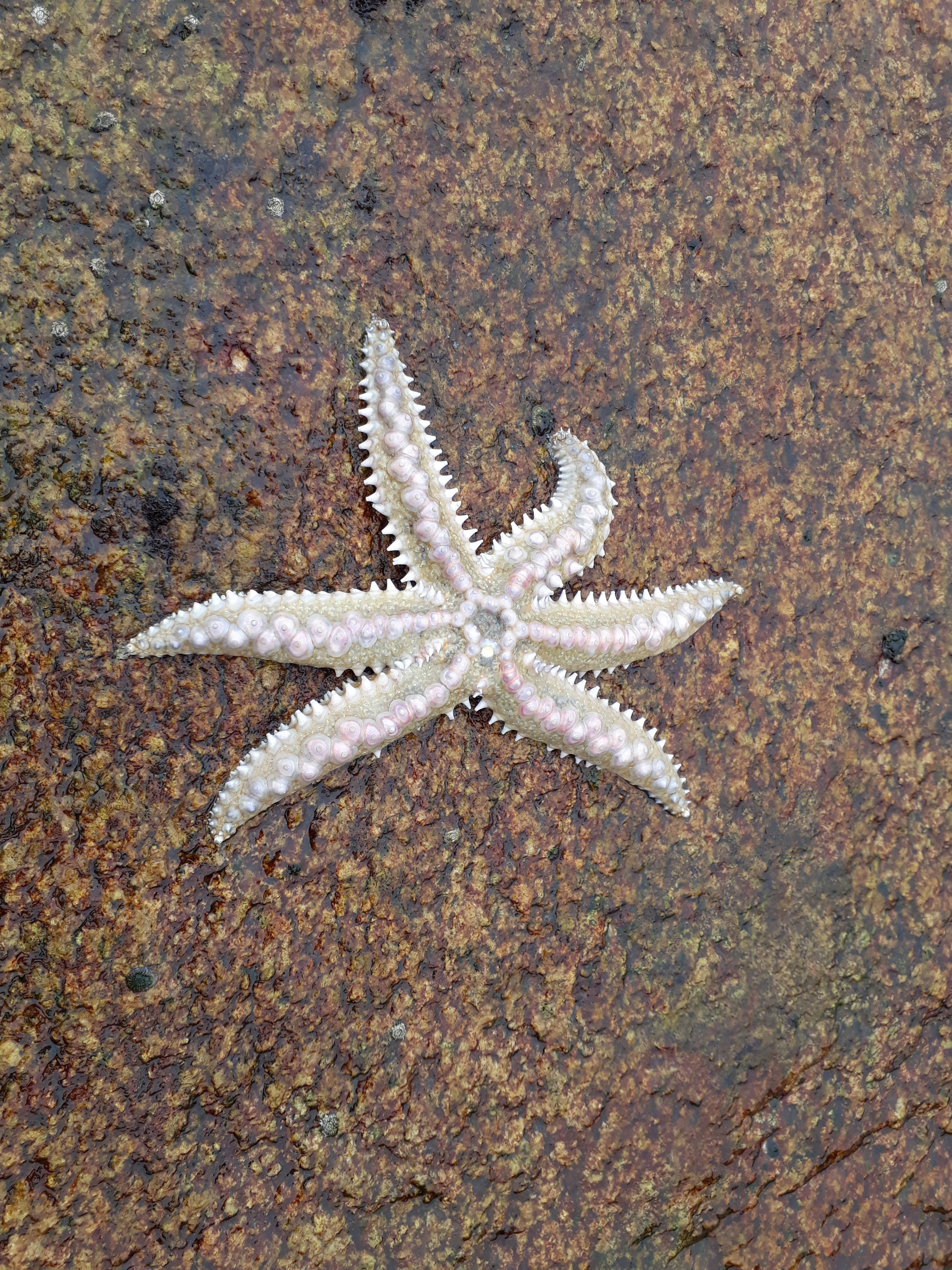

Scientific classification
- Kingdom: Animalia
- Phylum: Echinodermata
- Class: Asteroidea
- Order: Forcipulatida
- Family: Asteriidae
- Genus: Meyenaster; Verrill, 1913
- Species: M. gelatinosus

Binomial name
- Meyenaster gelatinosus (Meyen, 1834)

Synonyms
- Asteracanthion gelatinosus (Meyen, 1834); Asterias gelatinosa Meyen, 1834; Asterias rustica Gray, 1840

= Meyenaster =

Genus of starfishes

Meyenaster is a genus of starfish in the family Asteriidae. It is a monotypic genus and the only species is Meyenaster gelatinosus which was first described by the Prussian botanist and zoologist Franz Julius Ferdinand Meyen in 1834. It is found in the southeastern Pacific Ocean on the coasts of South America.

== Description ==
Meyenaster gelatinosus is a white starfish with six arms and a mean radius ranging from 150 to 210 mm (5.9 to 8.3 in).

== Distribution and habitat ==
Meyenaster gelatinosus is native to the southeastern Pacific Ocean where it is found on the coasts of Chile. It is abundant in kelp forests in the subtidal zone as well as being found on sand and gravel bottoms, and among seagrasses. It is usually found in areas with strong surge away from quiet locations.

== Ecology ==
In the kelp forests, M. gelatinosus is one of the dominant predators along with the starfish Stichaster striatus, Luidia magellanica and Heliaster helianthus, the fish Pinguipes chilensis, Semicossyphus darwini and Cheilodactylus variegatus, and the Chilean abalone (Concholepas concholepas), a gastropod mollusc. If M. gelatinosus manages to trap the multiarmed H. helianthus, it everts its stomach over several of the arms of its prey, and these become autotomised as a result of the predation; while the M. gelatinosus feeds on the shed arms, H. helianthus makes its escape. In a study in Chile, up to 76% of H. helianthus were found to have regenerating arms.

In a study in Tongoy Bay in north central Chile, M. gelatinosus was found to be a generalist predator in sand and gravel habitats, but showed a marked preference for the Peruvian scallop (Argopecten purpuratus) in seagrass meadows. During the study, the number of scallops declined dramatically when they were heavily harvested commercially over a short period. This caused the starfish to increase its preference for the scallop in both habitats, but it was forced to broaden its diet in the seagrass areas, substituting small epifauna for the missing scallops. The starfish can feed on all sizes of scallop, from 4 to 14 cm (2 to 6 in) in diameter, but particularly preys on the larger specimens. The local fishermen are aware of the competition they face from the starfish for the scallops.

In another study, the main prey was the Chilean sea urchin (Loxechinus albus) and M. gelatinosus often selected and pursued its prey with great care. The sea urchin responded to a foraging starfish at a distance of at least a metre by fleeing. This is an effective response where there is vigorous wave action, as the sea urchin gets swept away by the surging water. This sea urchin appeared to be able to distinguish between a foraging M. gelatinosus and a non-foraging one, taking evasive action in the first case but not in the second. In fact this sea urchin has even been observed touching the starfish when it is not searching for prey.
