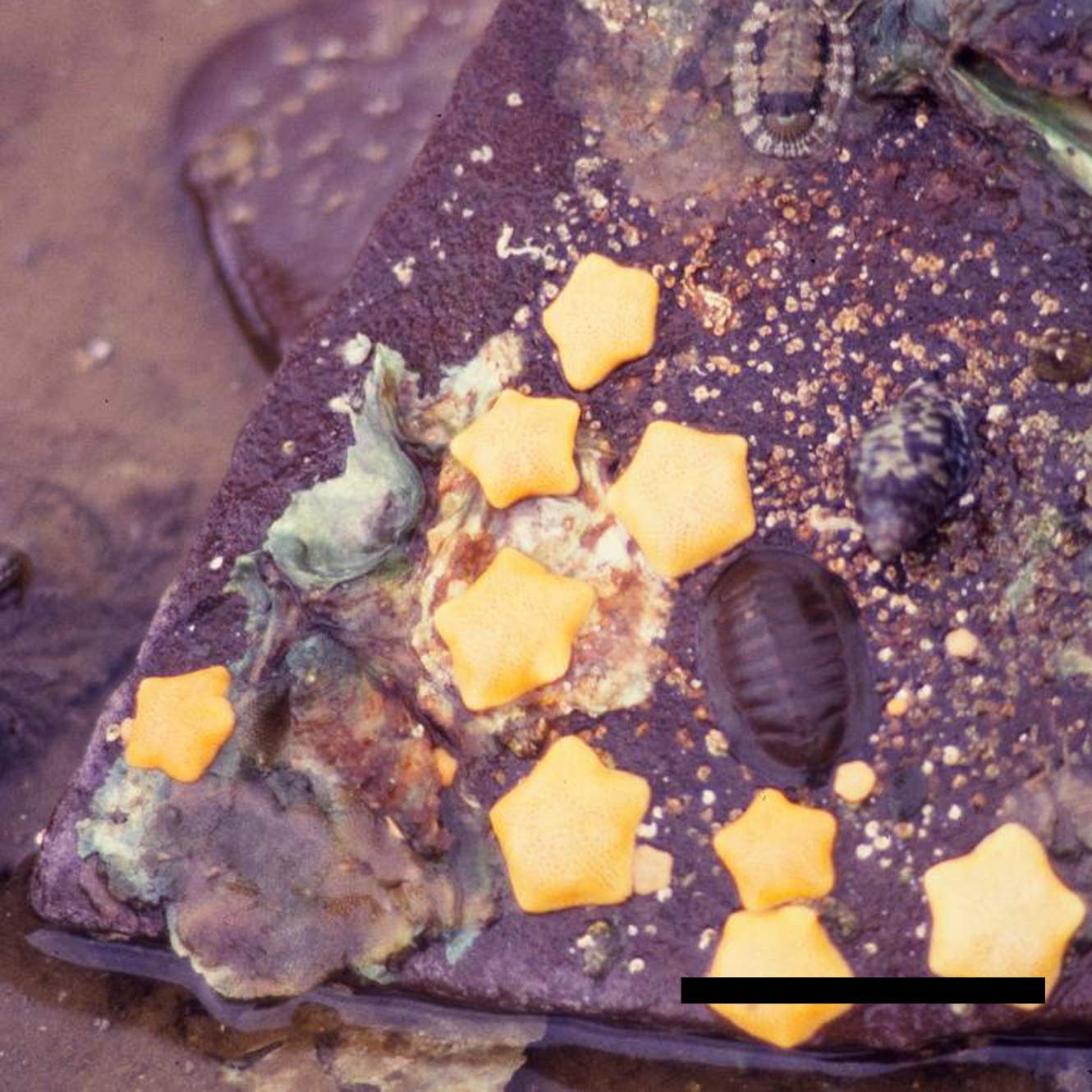

Conservation status
- Critically Endangered (IUCN 3.1)

Scientific classification
- Kingdom: Animalia
- Phylum: Echinodermata
- Class: Asteroidea
- Order: Valvatida
- Family: Asterinidae
- Genus: Parvulastra
- Species: P. vivipara

Binomial name
- Parvulastra vivipara (Dartnall, 1969)

Synonyms
- Patiriella vivipara Dartnall, 1969

= Parvulastra vivipara =

Species of starfish

Parvulastra vivipara, the Tasmanian live-bearing seastar, is a tiny, uniformly orange-yellow seastar, ranging between 15 mm (0.6 in) and 30 mm (1.18 in) in diameter. The species is typically a rounded, pentagonal shape, but some individuals can be found with three, four or six arms. It is endemic to littoral waters in southeast Tasmania.

Parvulastra vivipara is one of only six known species of seastars to give birth viviparously. The species was added to the IUCN Red List in 2023. It is currently listed as Critically Endangered.

== Description ==
Parvulastra vivipara is among the smallest sea stars in the world, with a maximum diameter of 30 mm (1.18 in). The species typically exhibits a rounded, cushion-like, pentagonal shape, however, morphological variation is common; individuals with three, four or six arms can occur. The aboral (upward-facing) surface is a consistent yellowish-orange, and the actinal (downward-facing) surface is slightly lighter in color. Parvulastra vivipara is a member of the Asterinidae family, a wide spanning group of stars sometimes characterized by their "knitted" appearance. This effect is due to crescent-shaped plated forming their aboral surface.

== Habitat and ecology ==
Parvulastra vivipara is endemic to the waters of south-eastern Tasmania. It resides in a variety of intertidal habitats including rocky shores and natural reef platforms. It is typically found in temperate waters; hiding under stones and in crevices in shallow water (<1.2m(4ft) deep). The starfish feeds on the microbial and algal film found on the submerged surfaces of rocks by everting (pushing out) its stomach through its mouth. Individuals are capable of everting the stomach to a diameter larger than that of its body and digesting the film in situ. It feeds mostly at night, however it will emerge to the top side of rocks to feed on overcast days.

Parvulastra vivipara is a self-fertile, matrotrophic, viviparous species. As such, they are simultaneous hermaphrodites, each individual typically having six to eight female gonads and a single male-type gonad. The gonads produce a few mature eggs and a small amount of sperm, suggesting the likelihood of self-fertilization; however, some cross-fertilization is likely to occur. One study demonstrated the ability of P. vivipara to reproduce in isolation for 8 years. Sexual maturity is achieved around 12 months, with a hypothesized lifespan of 8-10 years. Parvulastra vivipara has small vestigial larvae and reduced egg size, about 140–150 μm diameter. The embryos and juveniles are brooded within the parent's body cavity, with the parent carrying between 1 and 46 offspring in the gonads. Embryo development is asynchronous, so juveniles are present in various sizes in the gonads and can incubate throughout the course of the year. The number of juveniles released is typically greatest in the Southern Hemisphere's spring and summer (October-January), but high numbers of juveniles were also observed in June and July, indicating a possible mid-year release pattern.

Juveniles emerge through gonopores on the aboral surface of the parent, which, by softening connective tissue surrounding the gonopore and separating the ossicles, enlarge to let them out. As embryogenesis can continue in perpetuity, juvenile P. vivipara are born ranging in diameter from 1.5–5 mm. Juveniles can grow to up to 25–30% of the parent's diameter by the time they emerge, considerably larger than the parent's ova. These large offspring require extraembryonic nutrition, which they gain by cannibalizing their siblings inside the gonadal cavity. Sibling cannibalism may have arisen as a response to unpredictable intertidal environments. Larger size may allow for increased survival or distributive capacity in variable environments. Alternatively, competitive pressures between developing embryos for nutrient allocation may also have an effect on the timing of juveniles evacuating the gonad. Some juveniles are likely to exit the gonad to avoid predation by siblings. Regardless of the cause, juveniles typically emerge as large, near-mature individuals with seven pairs of tube feet per arm, leading them to be referred to as "crawl-away" offspring.

== Distribution ==
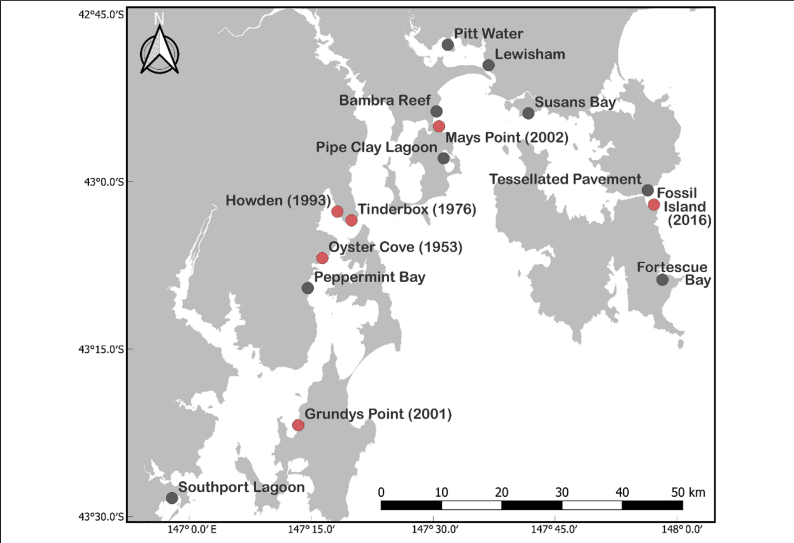
Range map of Parvulastra vivipara in Tasmania, 2022. Red dots denote extirpated population sites and the last year individuals were recorded.

Parvulastra vivipara is found only in the shallow intertidal waters of south-eastern Tasmania. As of 2024, the species is known from sixteen sites over ten separate locations. One of these locations was as a result of an accidental introduction in 1995 when an aquarium population was liberated into the sea at Woodbridge due to a concern over their care during a holiday period. Historically, there were at least 15 populations; five of these have gone locally extinct, three of which occurred within the past twenty years. The estimated total population size is just below 42,000 individuals and declining. Because P. vivipara does not undergo a planktonic larval stage, and its subpopulations are geographically isolated from each other, it has a limited scope of dispersal. Its total area of occupation is estimated to be approximately 16,940 m^{2} (~182,340 ft^{2}). At some sites, hybrids of P. vivipara and its sister taxa, Parvulastra exigua were found. These individuals were not included in the total metapopulation count.

== Conservation ==
Since the description of the species in 1969, densities of P. vivipara have been declining at all known sites. Recent data suggests a reduction in metapopulation of 90% between 1974 and 2001. The decline in population at key sites has been linked to anthropogenic impacts. Increased urbanization and runoff from nearby agricultural lands have impacted the concentrations of nutrients and sediments in P. vivipara habitats, disrupting the availability of food and shelter. Parvulastra vivipara is also vulnerable to increased wave energy caused by boat launching and fishing near habitats. Other threats include storm and wastewater runoff, changing sea temperatures, ocean acidity, salinity, and rising water levels.

The starfish also faces displacement by introduced Pacific oyster (Magallana gigas) farms. Magallana gigas is invasive to Tasmania, as well as the elongated porcelain crab (Petrolisthes elongatus); both of which have been associated with declines in population abundance of P. vivipara. It is also subject to competition for resources from introduced starfish, such as the New Zealand sea star (Patiriella regularis) and Asteria amurensis, the Northern Pacific sea star, the latter of which preys upon P. vivipara.

The total population density of this species has decline by over 90% since 1974, and populations that remain are vulnerable to extinction due to fragmentation and low amounts of gene flow among subpopulations. Some estimates suggest that on the current trajectory, P. vivipara populations will diminish to approximately 1 individual per site by 2111. In April of 2023, P. vivipara was determined to be Critically Endangered by the IUCN, whom suggest enhanced monitoring and protection is necessary to preserve this species.

== Taxonomy and misclassification ==
Parvulastra vivipara was first described in 1969 as Patiriella vivipara. Based on its morphology, it was suggested to be a sister taxa of Patiriella exigua (now known as Parvulastra exigua), a co-occurring sea star. Parvulastra exigua, P. vivipara and its sister taxa, P. parvivipara each participate in a benthic larval stage, however while P. vivipara and P. parvivipara give birth to live young, P. exigua does not. The two viviparous species likely diverged from P. exigua around 3 million years ago.

A revised taxonomy was proposed in 2004 which placed P. vivipara, P. parvivipara, and P. exigua into their own novel clade, Parvulastra.

Another species in the asterinidae family, Cryptasterina hystera, is also viviparous, however, despite diverging from a common ancestor, these lineages evolved viviparity independently of each other.
