= Chathamiidae =

Scientific classification
- Kingdom: Animalia
- Phylum: Arthropoda
- Clade: Pancrustacea
- Class: Insecta
- Order: Trichoptera
- Superfamily: Sericostomatoidea
- Family: Chathamiidae; Tillyard, 1925

Genera
- Chathamia; Philianisus

Synonyms
- Philanisidae Mosely & Kimmins, 1953

Family of caddisflies

Chathamiidae is a family of case-making caddisflies more commonly known as the marine caddisflies. Chathamiids are unusual among insects in their invasion of the tide pool environment. Larvae construct their cases of coralline algae. The eggs of one marine caddisfly species (Philanisus plebeius) are found inside starfish (Patiriella regularis in New Zealand and Patiriella exigua in Australia). The five described species are distributed along the coasts of New Zealand, New South Wales, and the Chatham Islands.

== Taxonomy ==
In 1925 Tillyard created the new sub-family Chathamiinae and described the species Chathamia brevipennis from the Chatham Islands. He wrote that this caddisfly is remarkable for the reduced wings and enormous head of adults. The two genera Philanisus and Chathamia were combined into the same family by Riek in 1977. The five species within this family were shown to be closely related using mtDNA sequence.

== Distribution ==
Found around the coast of New Zealand and in Southern Australia. Two species are endemic to New Zealand with restricted distributions. Kermadecs is home to P. fasciatus and P. mataua is restricted to Northern New Zealand. Chathamia integripennis is found in Northern New Zealand and Southern Australia. Chathamia brevipennis is restricted to the Chatham Islands. In contrast Philanisus plebeius is widespread around the shores of New Zealand.
