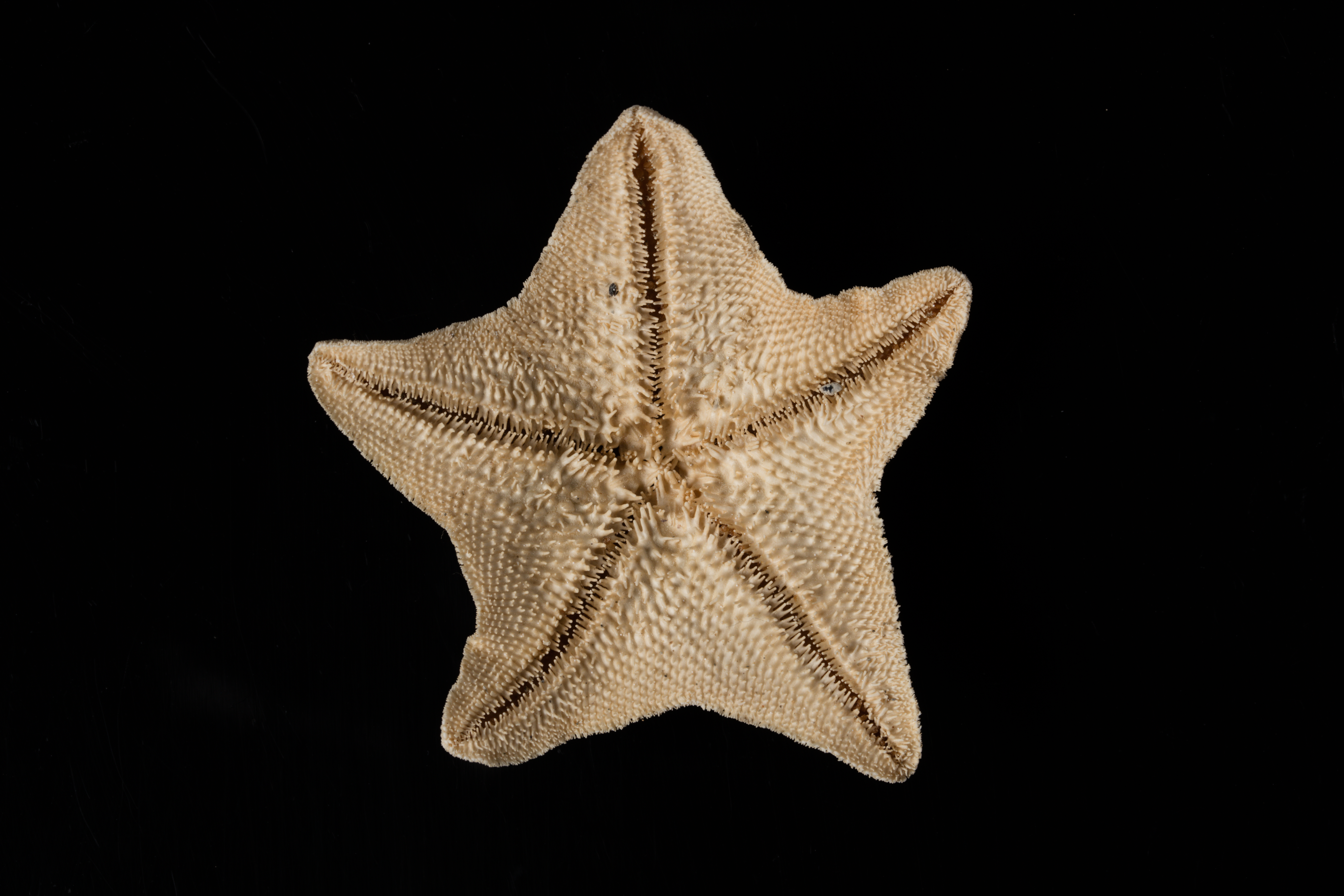

Scientific classification
- Kingdom: Animalia
- Phylum: Echinodermata
- Class: Asteroidea
- Order: Valvatida
- Family: Asterinidae
- Genus: Meridiastra
- Species: M. mortenseni

Binomial name
- Meridiastra mortenseni O'Loughlin, Waters & Roy, 2002

Synonyms
- Patiriella mortenseni

= Meridiastra mortenseni =

Species of starfish

Meridiastra mortenseni is a sea star of the family Asterinidae. It is endemic to New Zealand. Described as Patiriella mortenseni in 2002, it is named after T. Mortensen, who recorded it as distinct from Patiriella regularis, the New Zealand common cushion star, in 1925. According to genetic evidence, P. mortenseni was moved from the Patiriella genus to Meridiastra in 2004.

Reciprocal transplant experiments in Fiordland have shown it is less tolerant of hyposaline conditions than the sympatric (but distantly related) P. regularis. This is reflected in its distribution: it lives in deeper waters (at depths of roughly 10±3 m in Milford and Doubtful Sounds), below the low salinity layer. In laboratory conditions, they die after 24-hour exposure to water with salinities below 25‰.
