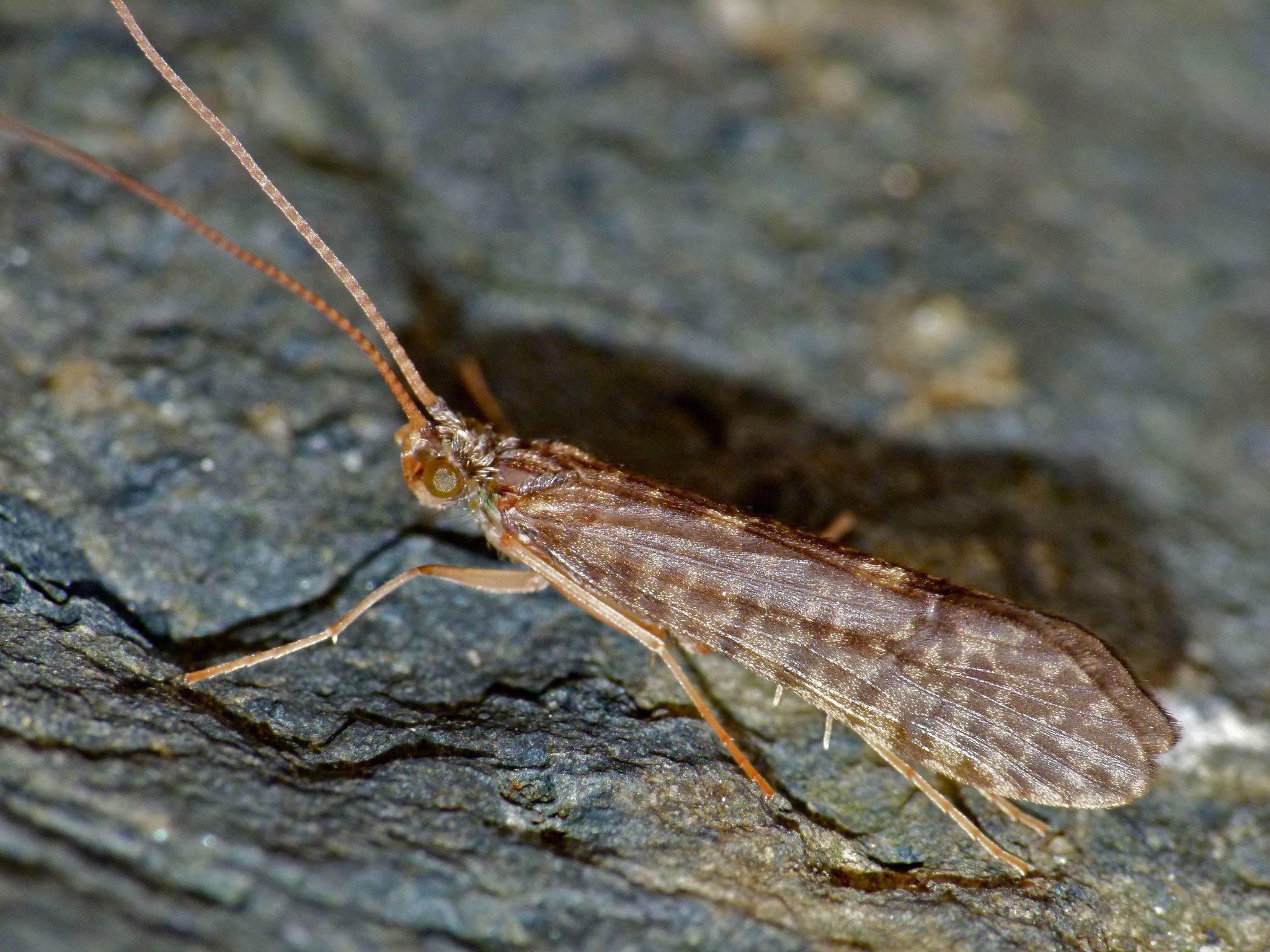
- Observed at Anderson's Bay, Dunedin

Scientific classification
- Kingdom: Animalia
- Phylum: Arthropoda
- Clade: Pancrustacea
- Class: Insecta
- Order: Trichoptera
- Family: Chathamiidae
- Genus: Philanisus
- Species: P. plebeius

Binomial name
- Philanisus plebeius Walker, 1852

Synonyms
- Anomalostoma alloneura Brauer, 1865

= Philanisus plebeius =

Species of caddisfly

Philanisus plebeius is a species of marine caddisfly in the family Chathamiidae found in New Zealand and Australia. These insects have winged terrestrial adults, eggs are laid in starfish and aquatic larvae live in marine rock pools.

== Taxonomy ==
This species was first described by Francis Walker in 1852 from a single adult male specimen obtained by Dr. Sinclair from New Zealand. 'Plebeius' means common. Brauer described the same species in 1866 and pointed out the unusual maxillary palpi of males where the insertion of the third joint is well before the apex. F. W. Hutton discovered the larvae live in rock-pools in 1882.

== Description ==
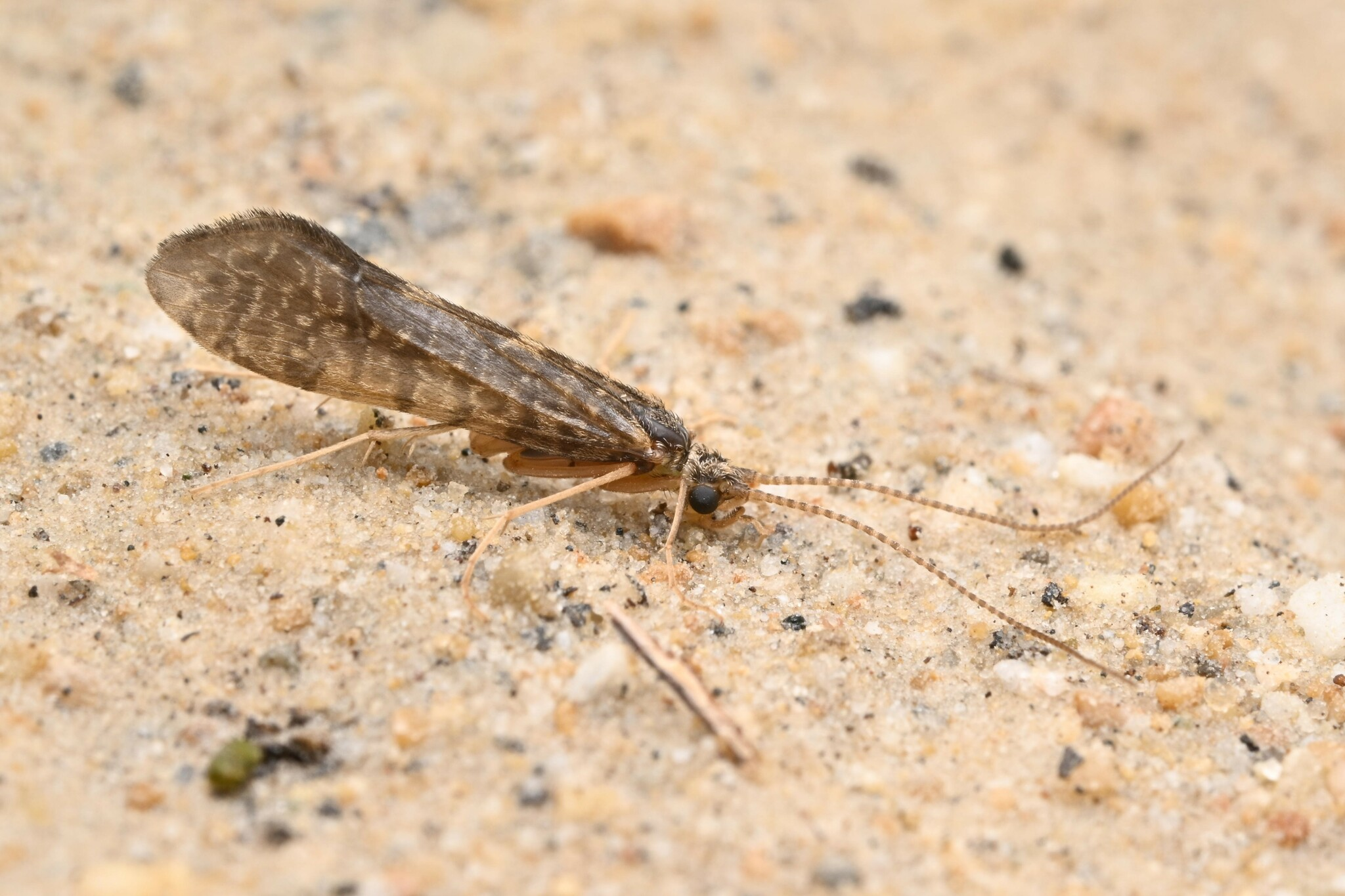
P. plebeius on seashore

Walker in his original description described this species as follows:

Male. — Tawny, thinly clothed with tawny hairs : antennae testaceous, rather stout, slightly setaceous, much longer than the body : legs testaceous, long; fore-tibiae without spurs; hinder tibiae with two pairs of long spurs, one pair near the tips, the other at the tips : abdomen with two appendages at the tip : wings narrow; fore-wings slightly gray, with pale brown marks or interrupted bands : hind-wings subhyaline. Length of the body 2 1/2 — 2 3/4 lines; of the wings 7 — 8 1/2 lines.

== Biology ==
There are very few insects that live in the sea but this caddisfly cannot survive in freshwater. Philanisus plebeius females lay eggs in starfish. Eggs are found most of the year in the body cavity (coelom) of cushion star Patiriella regularis (NZ) and P. exigua (Australia). Larvae live in tide pools and make a case from seaweed (e.g. Corallina, Zostera) and bits of sand or shell. Larvae go through 7 instars feeding on algae and detritus in tide pools.

== Distribution ==
Philanisus plebeius is found throughout New Zealand coastal areas as well as on the coast of New South Wales in Australia.
