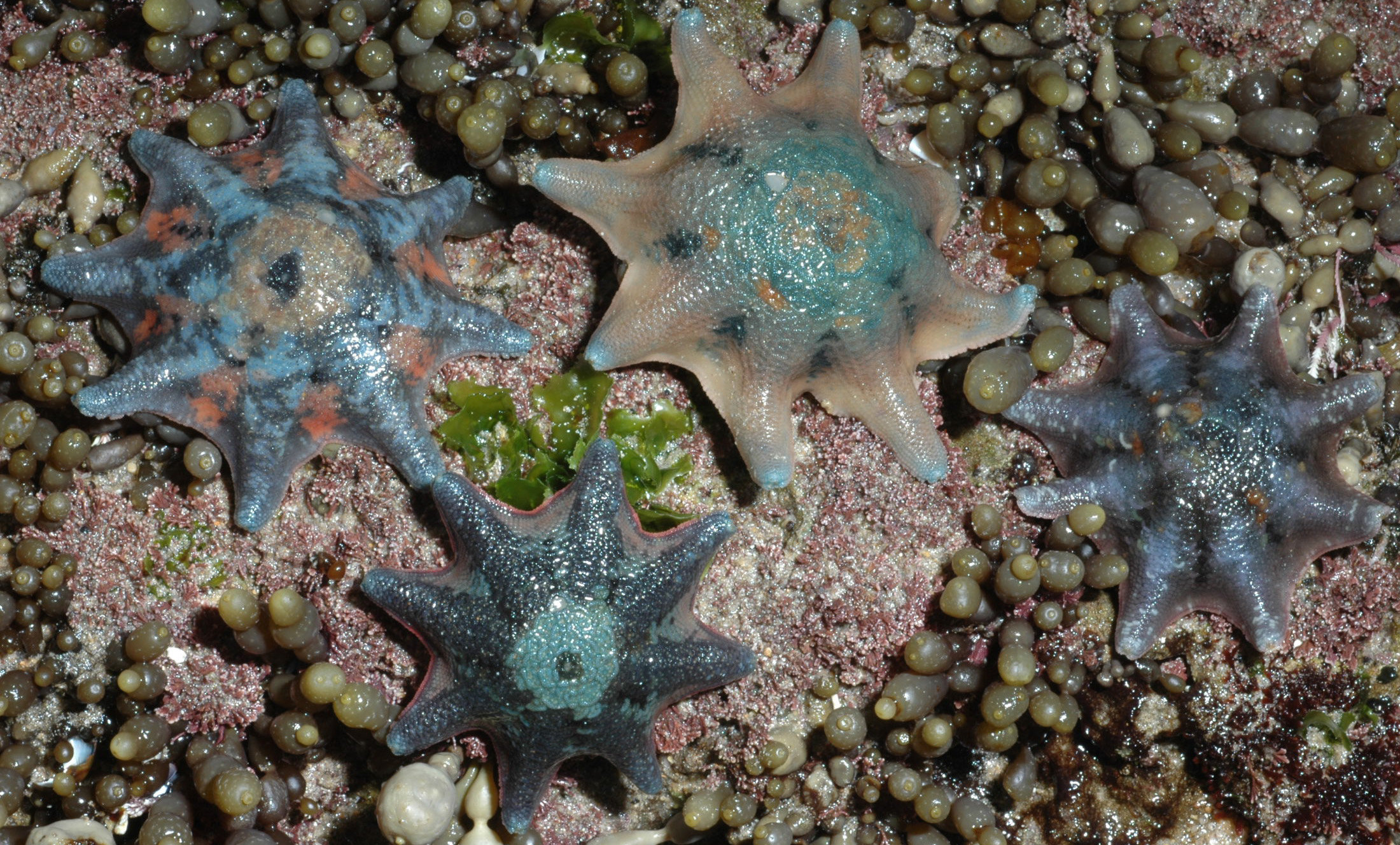

Scientific classification
- Kingdom: Animalia
- Phylum: Echinodermata
- Class: Asteroidea
- Order: Valvatida
- Family: Asterinidae
- Genus: Meridiastra
- Species: M. calcar

Binomial name
- Meridiastra calcar (Lamarck, 1816)

Synonyms
- Asterias calcar Lamarck, 1816; Asterias octagona Lamarck, 1816; Patiriella calcar (Lamarck, 1816)

= Meridiastra calcar =

Species of starfish

Meridiastra calcar, formerly classified as Patiriella calcar, is a species of sea star in the family Asterinidae. It is endemic to Australia. It is commonly known as carpet sea star, cushion sea star, or eight-armed sea star.

== Description ==
The cushion sea star typically has eight short, distinct, triangular "arms", though 7- or 9-armed individuals can be found. These "arms" are laterally fused together for some of their length, leaving ray-like tips of varying length to jut from the disk-like body. This species aboral surface can be any colour or combination of colours, while the oral side is uniformly pale. This sea star attains a maximum diameter from arm tip to arm tip of 5 cm–10 cm.

== Distribution and habitat ==
The cushion sea star is found in the intertidal zone of Australian coasts from Western Australia's south coast to Queensland's coast off Currumbin, while including Tasmania, South Australia, Victoria and New South Wales. This sea star species favours rocky coasts abiding both in tide pools and to a maximum depth of 3 meters below sea level.

== Ecology and behaviour ==
Like other sea stars, the cushion sea star is a slow-moving animal using its tube feet to move about, collecting or subduing the food items that constitute this omnivorous species diet, namely, algae, detritus, mussels and other invertebrates. This species is viviparous like a few others classified in the genus Patiriella, brooding its young within the body.
