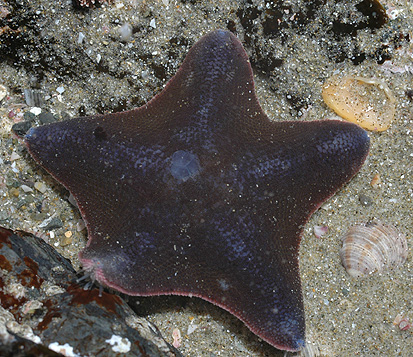
- Patiriella littoralis

Scientific classification
- Kingdom: Animalia
- Phylum: Echinodermata
- Class: Asteroidea
- Order: Valvatida
- Family: Asterinidae
- Genus: Patiriella; Verrill, 1913

Type species
- Asterina regularis Verrill, 1867

Species
- 5 species (see text)

= Patiriella =

Genus of starfishes

Patiriella is a genus of sea stars of the family Asterinidae. Many species formerly included in this genus have been transferred to other genera (Cryptasterina, Meridiastra, and Parvulastra). They are commonly known as carpet sea stars.

The genus is found in the Indian and Pacific Oceans, primarily around Australia and the south-west Pacific. They occur in shallow waters down to a depth of about 92 m (302 ft).

== Description and characteristics ==
Patiriella are sea stars with five or rarely six rays (arms). The shape ranges from subpentagonal to having short, discrete rays. The interradial margin is straight to incurved. They are medium-sized, with Patiriella regularis reaching a radius of 39 mm (1.5 in). Patiriella regularis can rarely show fissiparity.

== Species ==
There are five recognized species:

- Patiriella inornata Livingstone, 1933
- Patiriella littoralis (Dartnall, 1970)
- Patiriella oliveri (Benham, 1911)
- Patiriella paradoxa Campbell & Rowe, 1997
- Patiriella regularis (Verrill, 1867)
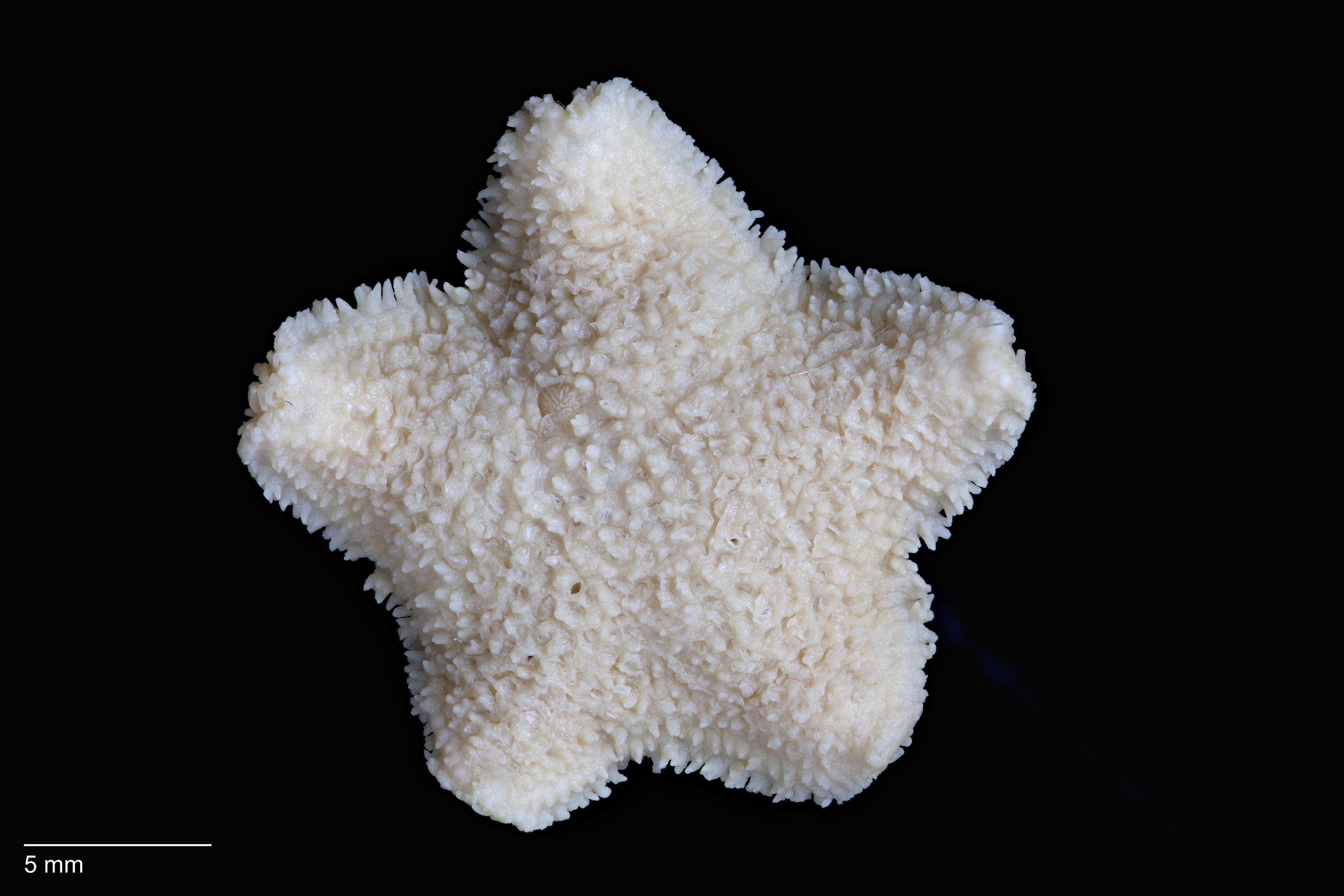
Patiriella littoralis.

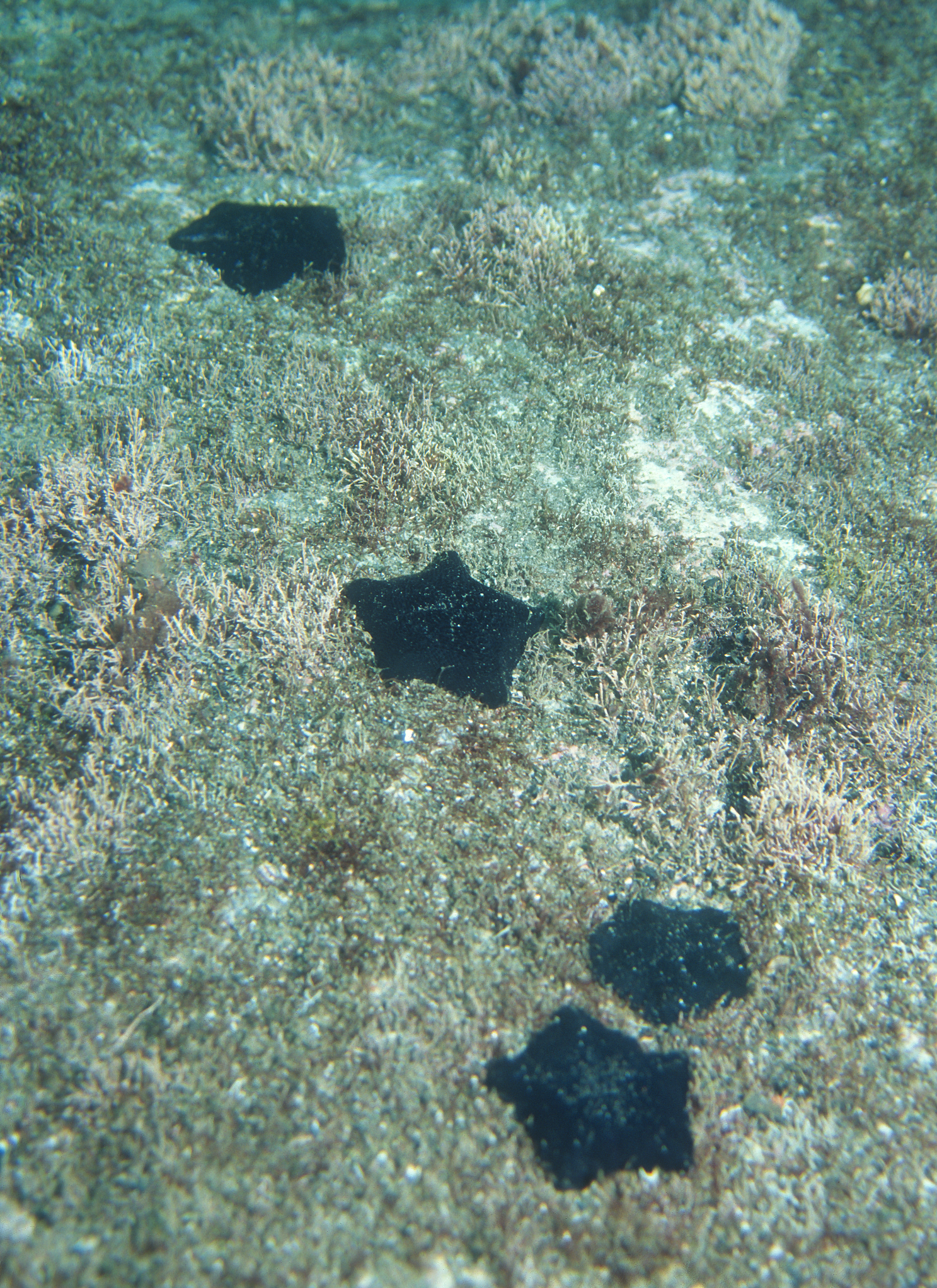
Patiriella oliveri.

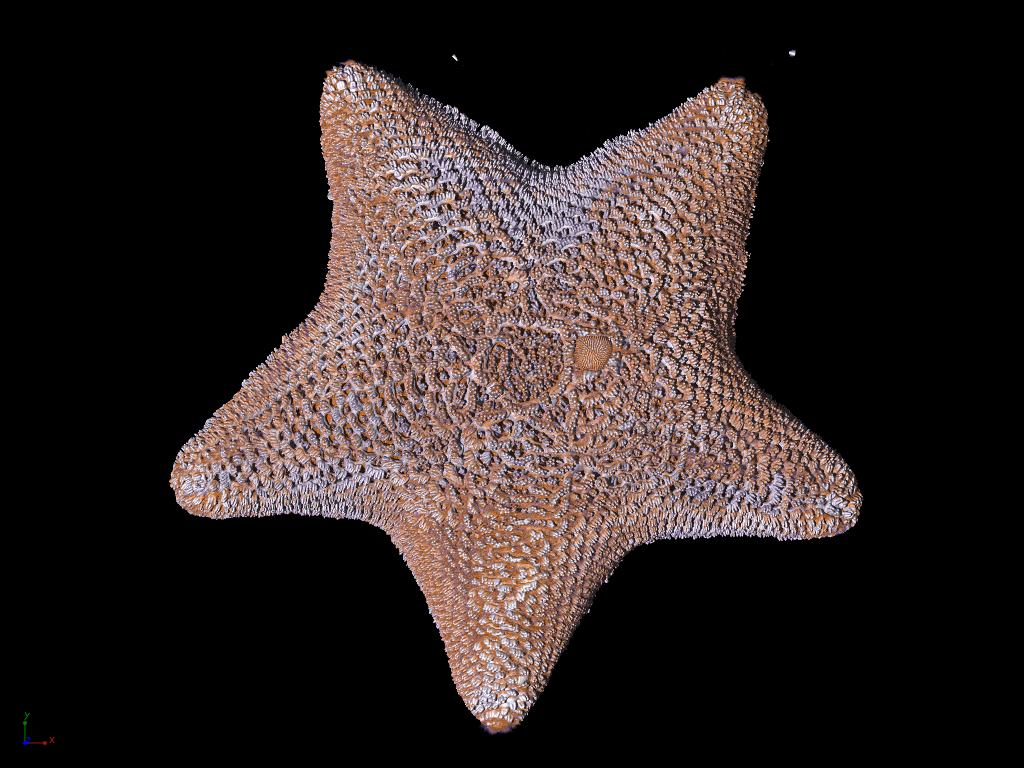
Patiriella regularis.
