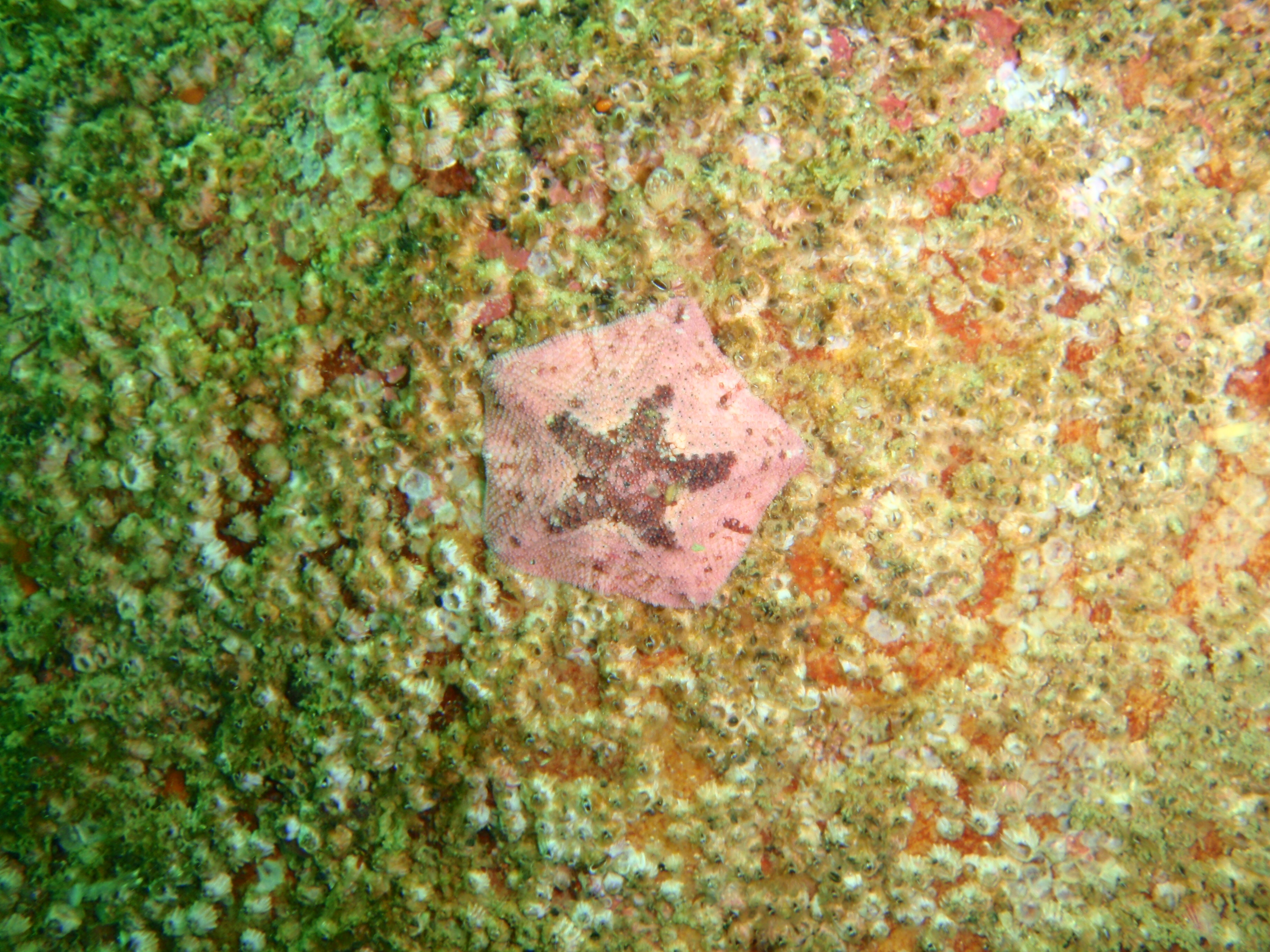

Scientific classification
- Kingdom: Animalia
- Phylum: Echinodermata
- Class: Asteroidea
- Order: Valvatida
- Family: Asterinidae
- Genus: Parvulastra
- Species: P. dyscrita

Binomial name
- Parvulastra dyscrita (Clark, 1923)

Synonyms
- Asterina dyscrita H.L. Clark, 1923; Patiriella dyscrita (Clark, 1923)

= Parvulastra dyscrita =

Species of sea star

Parvulastra dyscrita is a species of starfish belonging to the family Asterinidae. The species is found in Southern Africa.
