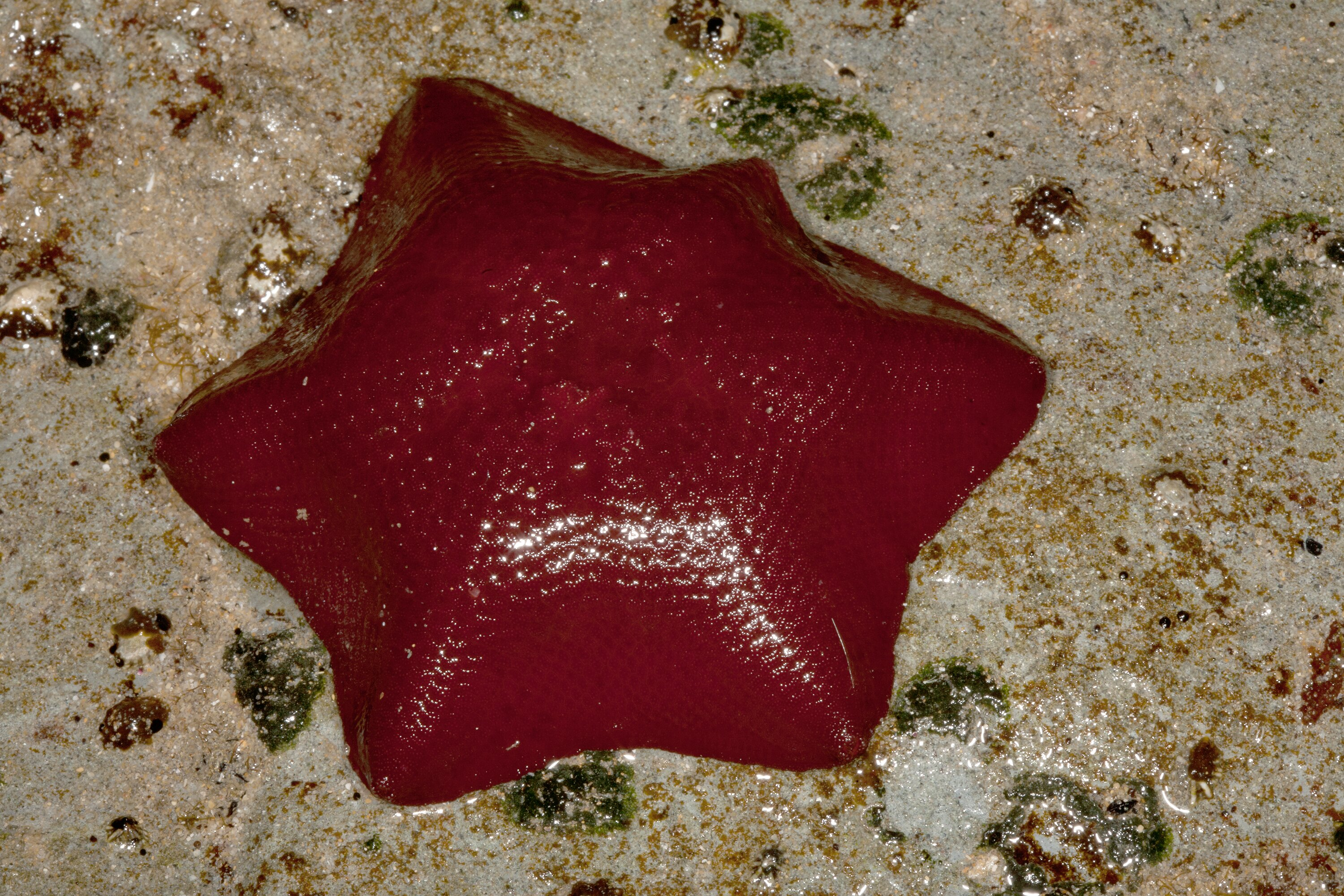

Scientific classification
- Kingdom: Animalia
- Phylum: Echinodermata
- Class: Asteroidea
- Order: Valvatida
- Family: Asterinidae
- Genus: Meridiastra
- Species: M. gunnii

Binomial name
- Meridiastra gunnii (Gray, 1840)

Synonyms
- Patiriella brevispina H.L. Clark, 1938; Patiriella gunni (Gray, 1840)

= Meridiastra gunnii =

Species of starfish

Meridiastra gunnii is an Australian species of sea star.

It has six arms and can be any colour.

Molecular evidence indicated that there were genetically divergent eastern and western forms of what is currently referred to as M. gunnii in southern Australia, and that a taxonomic revision was necessary. Further studies have shown that it can be conspecific with Patiriella brevispina.
