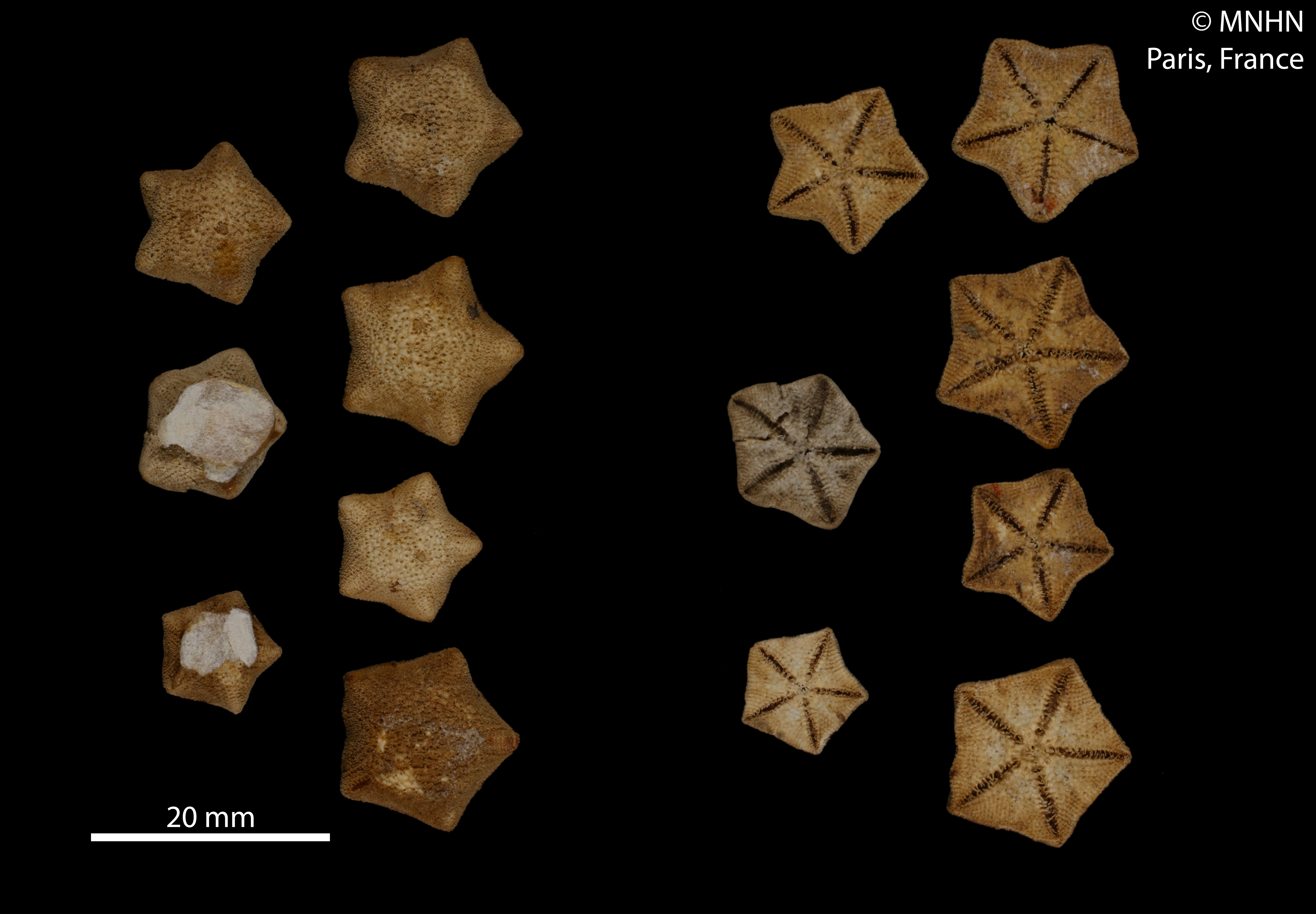
- Parvulastra exigua

Scientific classification
- Kingdom: Animalia
- Phylum: Echinodermata
- Class: Asteroidea
- Order: Valvatida
- Family: Asterinidae
- Genus: Parvulastra; O'Loughlin, 2004

= Parvulastra =

Genus of starfishes

Parvulastra is a genus of starfish belonging to the family Asterinidae. The species of this genus are found in Southern Hemisphere.

The genus shows an unusual reproductive mode within Asterinidae: Parvulastra parvivipara and Parvulastra vivipara are viviparous. Prior to their description as distinct species, they were considered variants of Parvulastra exigua, which has free-living (but non-feeding) larvae.

== Species ==
There are five species:

- Parvulastra calcarata (Perrier, 1869)
- Parvulastra dyscrita (H.L. Clark, 1923)
- Parvulastra exigua (Lamarck, 1816)
- Parvulastra parvivipara (Keough & Dartnall, 1978)
- Parvulastra vivipara (Dartnall, 1969)
