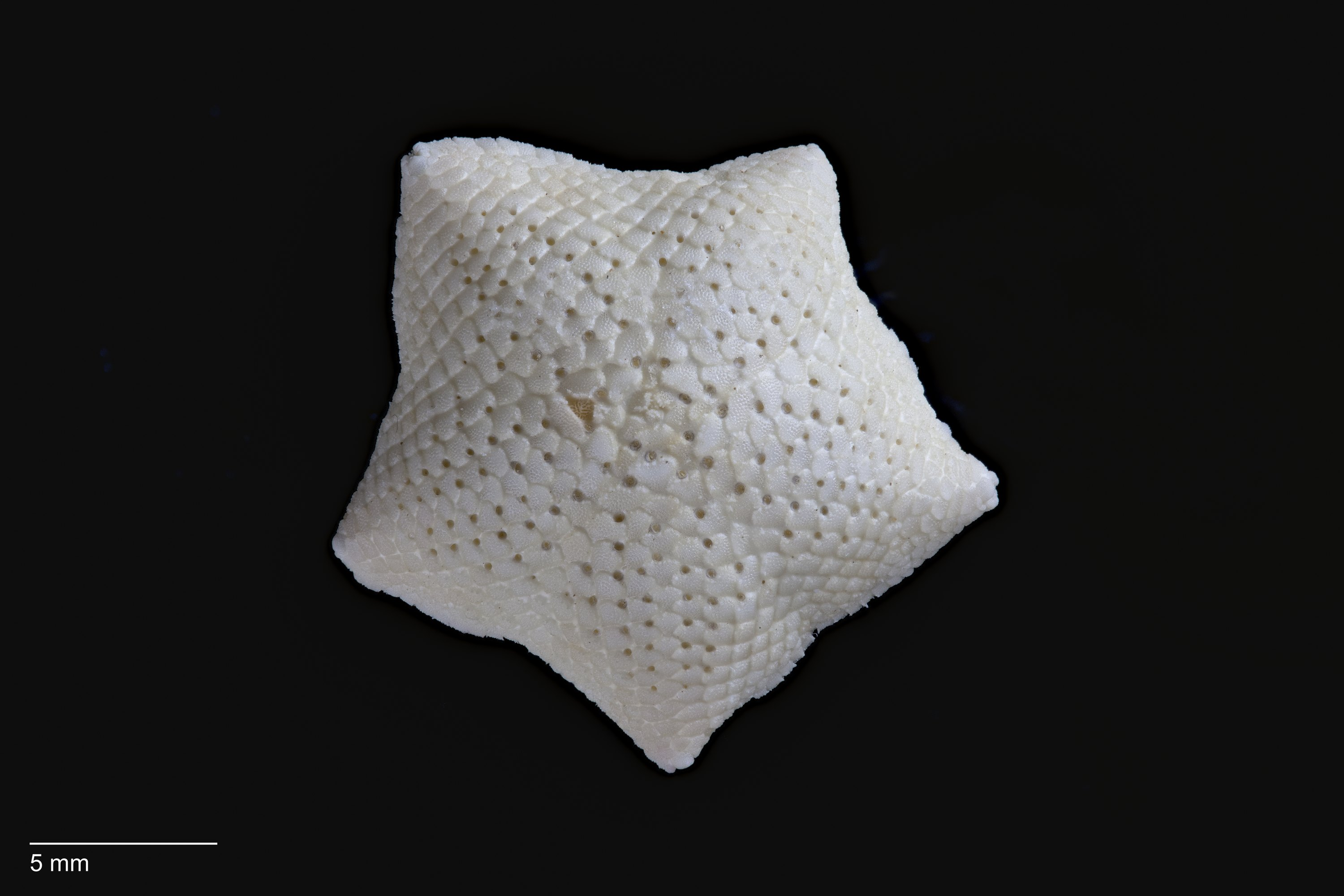
- Meridiastra atyphoida – the type species

Scientific classification
- Kingdom: Animalia
- Phylum: Echinodermata
- Class: Asteroidea
- Order: Valvatida
- Family: Asterinidae
- Genus: Meridiastra; O'Loughlin, 2002

Type species
- Asterina atyphoida H.L. Clark, 1916

Species
- 11 species (see text)

= Meridiastra =

Genus of star fish

Meridiastra is a genus of starfish in the family Asterinidae. The genus is found in the Indian and Pacific Oceans, with most records from the waters around Australia. They occur in shallow waters down to a depth of about 59 m (194 ft). Meridiastra are morphologically similar to the Atlantic genus Asterina. They are also phylogenetically close and possibly sister genera.

== Etymology ==
The generic name is derived from the Latin meridies (=south) and astrum (=star), in reference to the southern Australian and Pacific distribution of the genus (at the time of description – the genus now includes also species occurring on the northern hemisphere (Mexico, Panama)).

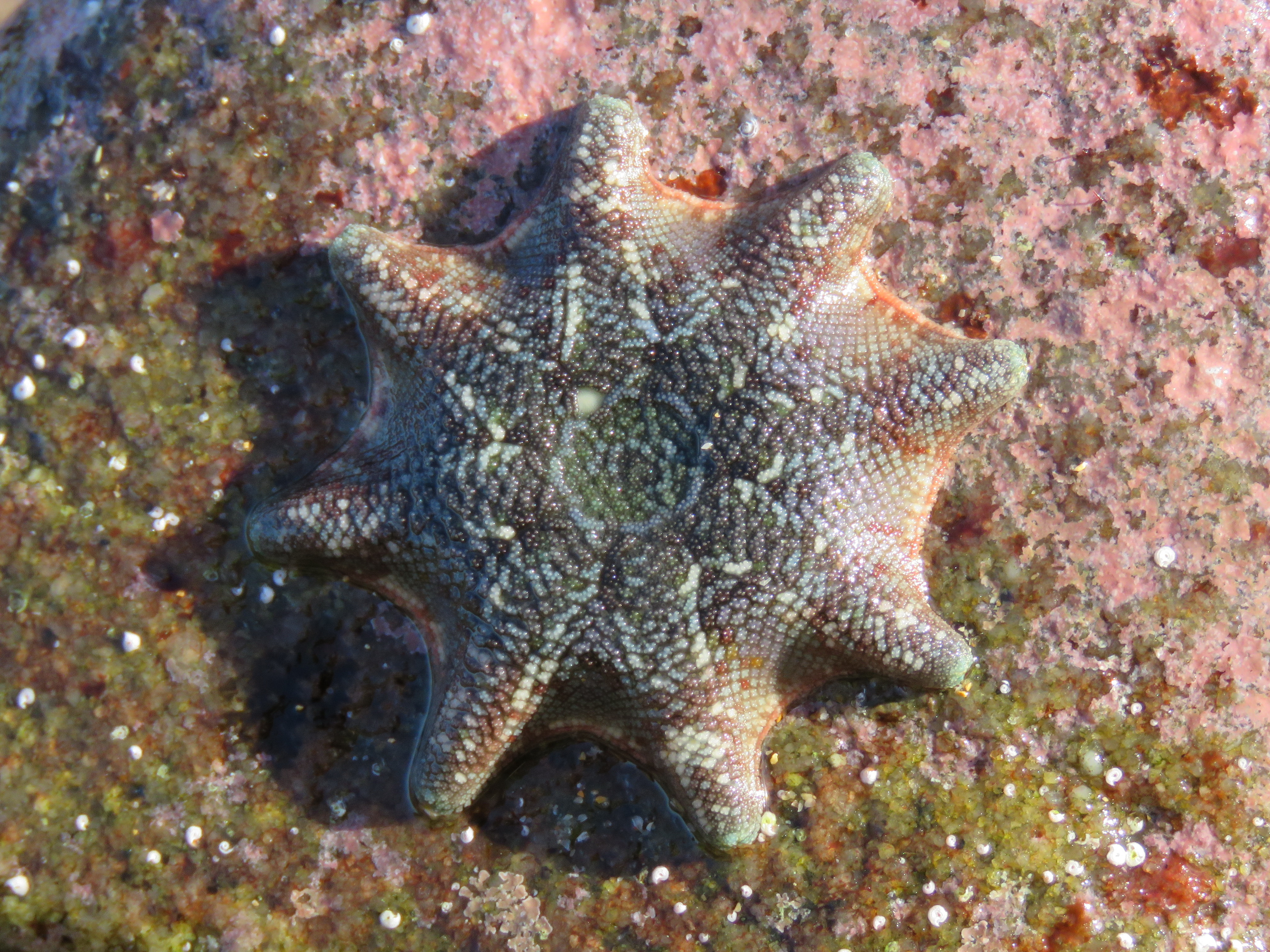
Meridiastra calcar – an example of a species with distinct rays

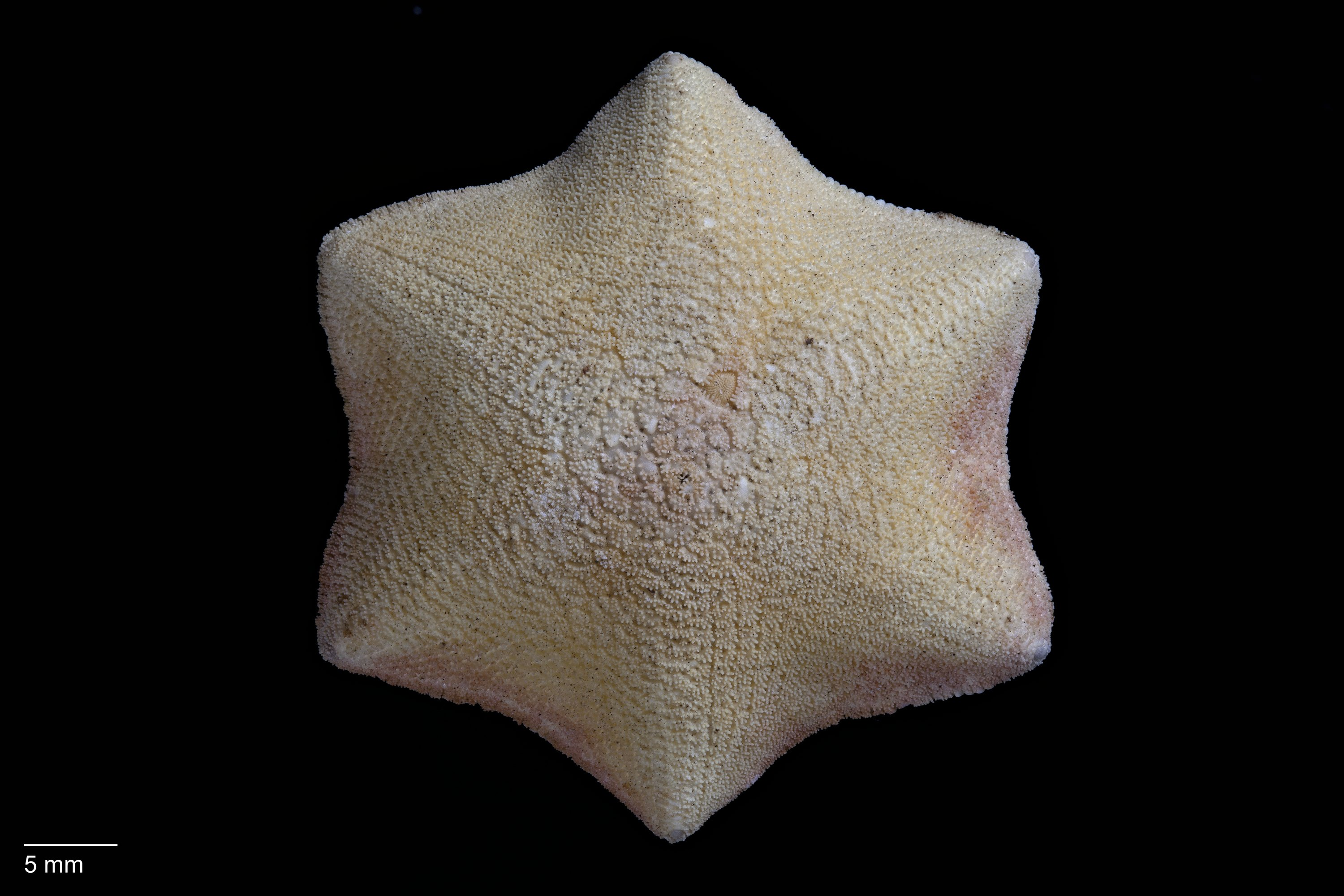
Meridiastra medius – an example of a species with indistinct rays

== Description ==
Meridiastra are sea stars with five to eight rays (arms). They range from very small (Meridiastra rapa: radius 6 mm (0.24 in)) to medium-sized (Meridiastra gunnii: radius 56 mm (2.2 in)). The interradial margin is straight to incurved; when the rays are distinct, they have narrowly rounded to pointed tips. One species, Meridiastra fissura, is fissiparous.

== Species ==
There are 11 recognized species:

- Meridiastra atyphoida (H.L. Clark, 1916)
- Meridiastra calcar (Lamarck, 1816)
- Meridiastra fissura O'Loughlin, 2002
- Meridiastra gunnii (Gray, 1840)
- Meridiastra medius (O'Loughlin, Waters & Roy, 2003)
- Meridiastra modesta (Verrill, 1867)
- Meridiastra mortenseni (O'Loughlin, Waters & Roy, 2002)
- Meridiastra nigranota O'Loughlin, 2002
- Meridiastra occidens (O'Loughlin, Waters & Roy, 2003)
- Meridiastra oriens (O'Loughlin, Waters & Roy, 2003)
- Meridiastra rapa O'Loughlin, 2002
