= Parvulastra parvivipara =

Scientific classification
- Kingdom: Animalia
- Phylum: Echinodermata
- Class: Asteroidea
- Order: Valvatida
- Family: Asterinidae
- Genus: Parvulastra
- Species: P. parvivipara

Binomial name
- Parvulastra parvivipara (Keough & Dartnall, 1978)

Synonyms
- Patiriella parvivipara Keough and Dartnall, 1978

Species of starfish

Parvulastra parvivipara is a very small species of starfish in the family Asterinidae. It is a viviparous species and gives birth to live young. It lives in rock pools on intertidal granite rocks in a limited area of South Australia.

== Description ==
Adults of P. parvivipara can grow to a diameter of about 1 cm (0.4 in) and are an orange-yellow colour. They are the smallest known starfish.

== Distribution and habitat ==
P. parvivipara is endemic to the coast of South Australia, where it is found within 200 km (120 mi) of the Eyre Peninsula. Its distribution is limited to intertidal rock pools on granite rocks. Some seemingly suitable pools contain none of these starfish, while others have large numbers. Starfish favoured pools with little wave action, but with a considerable degree of biodiversity. They also preferred pools low down the beach rather than high-level pools.

The main identified threats to the Tasmanian live-bearing sea star are habitat deterioration and destruction through sedimentation, eutrophication, and coastal development. As P. parvivipara uses mostly small boulders that are particularly susceptible to disturbances that are increasing with rising sea levels, future ecological restoration effects to protect this rare species may be required.

== Lifecycle ==
P. parvivipara has a very unusual lifecycle for a starfish. The adults are self-fertilising hermaphrodites and the eggs are brooded within the gonads. No planktonic larval stage is seen, and the directly developing juveniles are cannibalistic, feeding on other embryos and juveniles while in the brood pouch. When mature enough, they are released into the water in batches of up to 20, where they continue their lives, quite probably in the same rock pool as their parents. Most starfish disperse to new habitats during the planktonic larval stage, but P. parvivipara is unable to do this. It likely can move to a new pool only by chance when an individual is swept there by a wave. Because of the inability of this species to disperse in a typical starfish manner, it may experience some adverse circumstances in any particular pool, be exterminated there, and perhaps recolonize the pool later.

Some individuals breed in the autumn and winter, but most do so in the late spring and the summer, when the brood sizes are smallest and the juveniles are the largest when born. By varying size and number of offspring in this way, the starfish is thought to maximize the chances that its young will survive.

== See also ==
- List of marine animals of Australia (temperate waters)
- Smallest organisms
