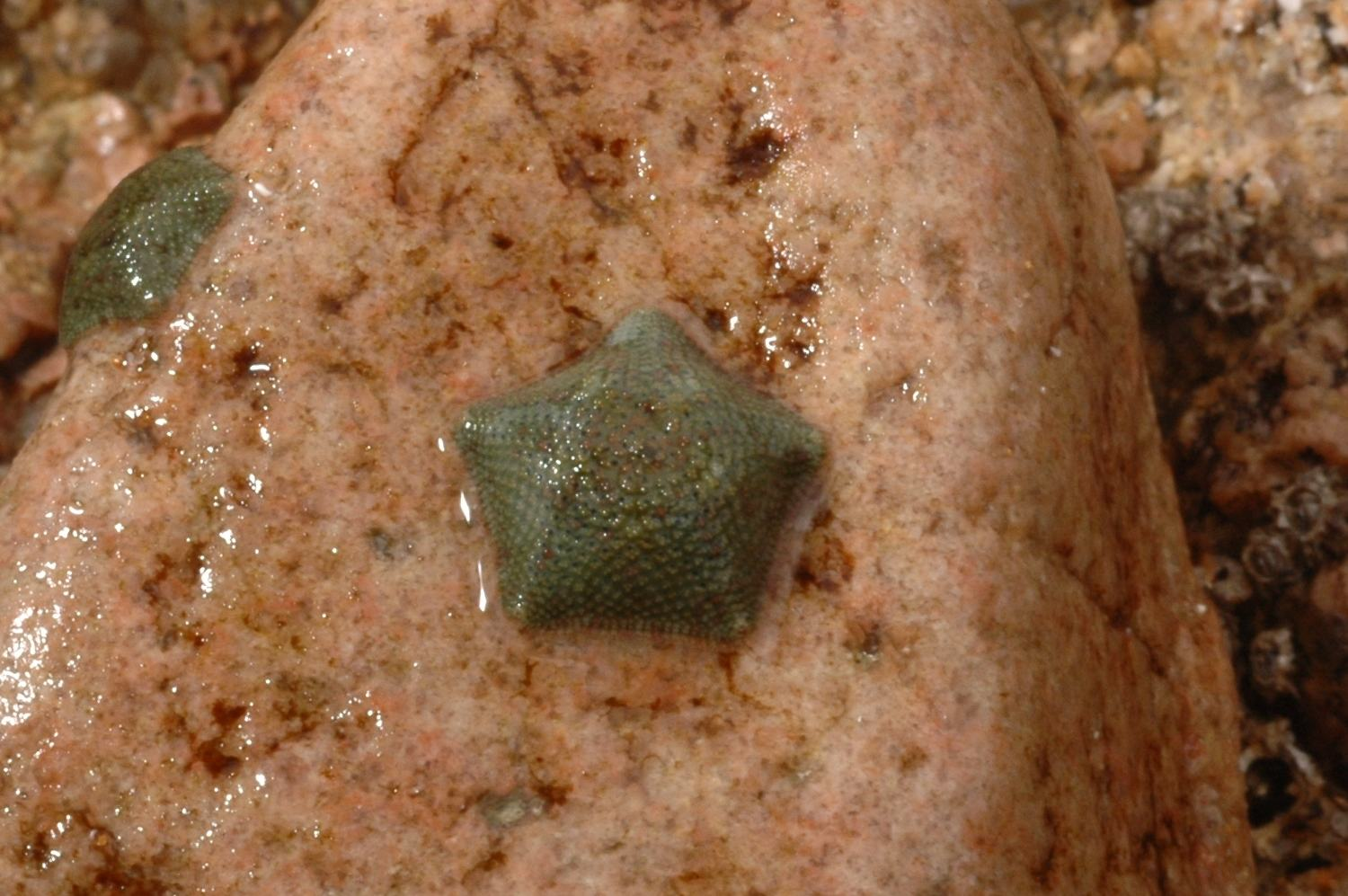

Scientific classification
- Domain: Eukaryota
- Kingdom: Animalia
- Phylum: Echinodermata
- Class: Asteroidea
- Order: Valvatida
- Family: Asterinidae
- Genus: Parvulastra
- Species: P. exigua

Binomial name
- Parvulastra exigua (Lamarck, 1816)

Synonyms
- Asterias exigua Lamarck, 1816; Asterias minuta de Blainville, 1834; Asterina exigua (Lamarck, 1816); Asteriscus krauss (Gray, 1840); Patiriella exigua (Lamarck, 1816)

= Parvulastra exigua =

Species of starfish

Parvulastra exigua, or the dwarf cushion star is a species of sea star in the family Asterinidae. It can be found in temperate intertidal marine communities from geographically widespread sites around the southern hemisphere (including South Africa and Australia).

== Description ==
Parvulastra exigua has pentagonal body with no obvious protruding arms. Dorsal surface is tiled with a small cluster of spines at each tile. Colour is variegated, with bright patterns in orange, brown, green and white.

== Distribution ==
Parvulastra exigua is found from Namibia to Mozambique on intertidal zones up to 3 m, on St Helena, St Paul, and southeastern Australia.

== Natural history ==
Parvulastra exigua occurs in the intertidal zone and slightly deeper, and is well camouflaged. It feeds on microscopic algae by everting stomach onto substrate. No planktonic larval stage is present.
