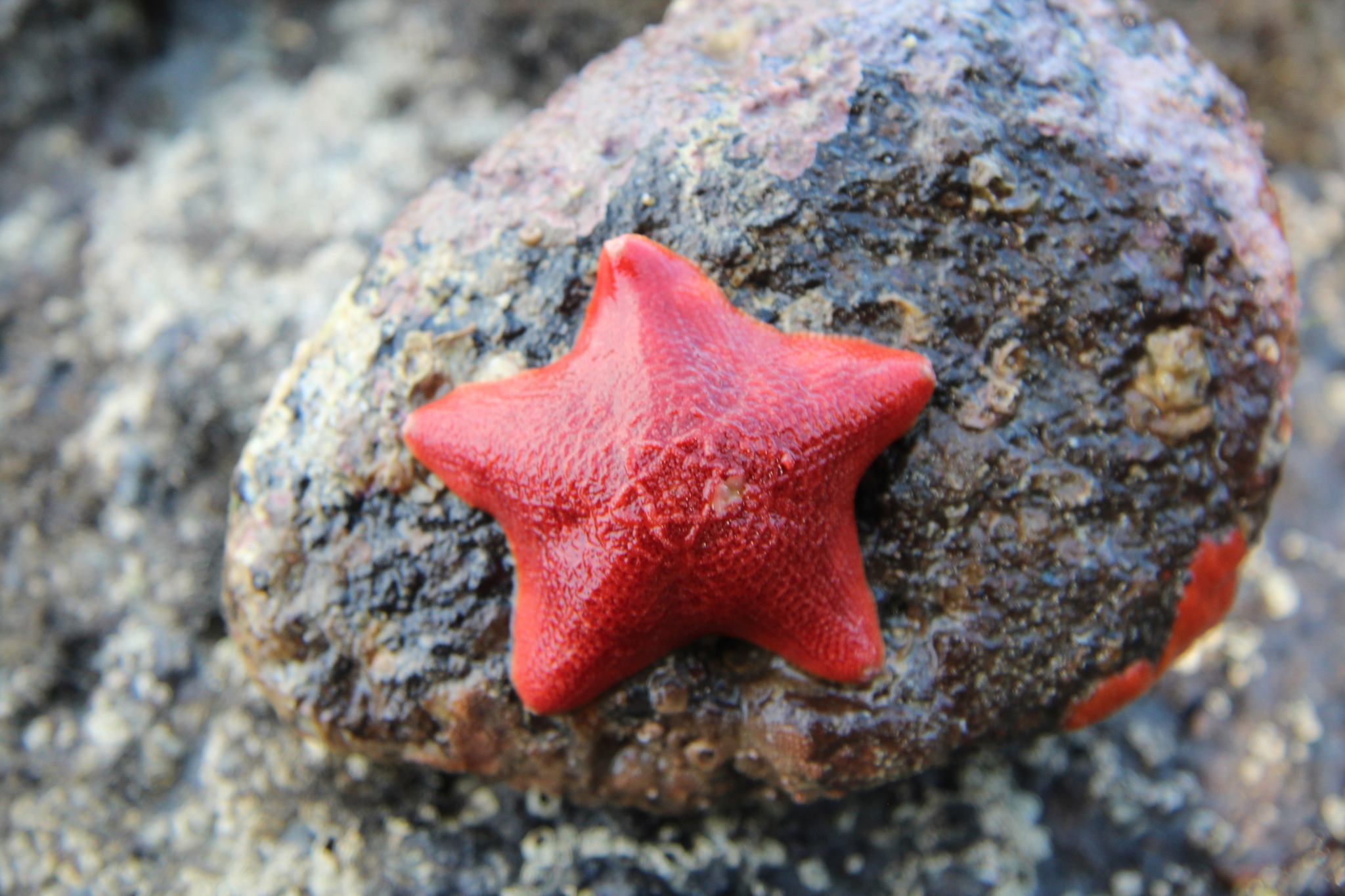

Scientific classification
- Kingdom: Animalia
- Phylum: Echinodermata
- Class: Asteroidea
- Order: Valvatida
- Family: Asterinidae
- Genus: Patiriella
- Species: P. regularis

Binomial name
- Patiriella regularis (Verrill, 1867)

= Patiriella regularis =

Species of echinoderm

Patiriella regularis, the New Zealand common cushion star, or, in Māori, kapu parahua, is a sea star native to New Zealand. It is one of New Zealand's most common rocky shore starfish.

== Description ==
Patiriella regularis is a spinulosan asterinid with a pentagonal shape. It typically has five short arms, however, 2% of the population is composed of individuals with 4, 6, 7 or 8 arms. It has an arm spread of up to 60 mm (2.4 in). The colour of Patiriella regularis differs greatly between individuals and includes blues, greens and browns as the more common colours, although oranges, reds and individuals with mottled forms have also been identified.

Two separate forms of Patiriella regularis have been identified. The most significant difference between the two is the plate arrangement along the ray crests. They typically grow up to 10 cm (3.9 in) across in diameter, although their sizes vary greatly within the species.

== Taxonomy ==
New Zealand is home to a rich abundance of endemic asteroid fauna. Patiriella regularis is one of these species and was originally described by Verill in 1867 as Asterina regularis. In 1913, Verrill described the new genus Patiriella, naming Patiriella regularis as the type species for this genus.

== Range ==
=== Natural global range ===
Although native to New Zealand, Patiriella regularis has also spread to Southern Australia and Tasmania. This spread is likely due to mussel exports in the 19th century. Establishing populations in Tasmania are bordering on becoming labelled an invasive species due to their effects on the native fauna in those habitats.

Patiriella regularis is the most commonly found asteroid in New Zealand and tends to dominate most suitable habitats. They range the full length of New Zealand, from the North Cape to Stewart Island. Patiriella regularis is abundant in many harbours around New Zealand, including Otago Harbour and Whangateau Harbour, at opposite ends of the country. They are frequently found in the Fiordland of New Zealand, specifically throughout the Doubtful and Milford Sounds. Patiriella regularis is also found in the Kermadec Islands, a subtropical island group 1000 km northeast of the North Island.

== Habitat ==
Patiriella regularis inhabit shallow waters in rocky reefs and sandy areas close to coastlines. It is found in intertidal cobble fields as well as shallow and moderately deep rock pools. This species lives on a wide range of substrates with small preference shown toward shell gravel substrates. It is found on rocky substrates, sandy bottoms, amongst/on boulders, crushed shells and many other habitats. This starfish is common in the shallow depths of these waters within the low salinity layer (LSL), a depth of between <1–12 m that typically has a low diversity of species in comparison to below the LSL.

== Ecology ==
=== Life cycle and phenology ===
Patiriella regularis follows an annual reproductive cycle. They reproduce asexually by fission and also sexually, with males and females releasing eggs and sperm into the water for external fertilisation. Reproductive success in Patiriella regularis is dependent on environmental conditions that are the most favourable for success of the offspring, for example the abundance of food within the habitat. Where food abundances are low, the stored food reserves in the pyloric caeca of the asterinid will also be low, resulting in poor gonad development.

The reproductive cycle of females of Patiriella regularis is divided into five stages: the recovery stage, the growing stage, the maturing stage, the partly-spawned stage and the spent stage. These stages are characterised by the number of oocytes in each stage of development, the presence or absence of degenerating octets and the abundance of somatic cells. The female Patiriella regularis' reproductive cycle follows a sequence of events from oogenesis, gonad activation, spawning of gametes, regression of gonadal activity and a resting period. Oogenesis produces an ovum from a primordial germ cell with cell growth and organelle synthesis.

Patiriella regularis is an oviparous animal, one which deposits eggs that hatch outside of their body. Patiriella regularis spawns eggs which are around the size of 150 μm. During the reproductive process for oviparous animals, the gamete has to be prepared as a specialised cell that has the energy and nutrition required for the future embryo, as it cannot rely on the mother like viviparous organisms can. It is during the most significant event of the reproductive cycle, oogenesis, that these nutrients are accumulated in the form of yolk proteins in the oocyte for future use by the embryo. Ovarian activity peaks in the southern hemisphere summer months (December to January) followed by a gradual decrease towards the end of January through March. Ovarian activity reaches its minimum value of 5% at the end of March, is stable through austral autumn and gradually begins to rise through winter before increasing almost two-fold between spring and summer. This species of asteroid has a relationship with photoperiod as well as water temperature; as day length increases/water temperature increases, ovarian activity increases similarly and spawning occurs just after the longest day in the southern hemisphere towards the end of December.

The larval stage of Patiriella regularis is consistent with the typical form of most asteroids, with indirect development through the larval stages of bipinnaria and brachiolaria. Bipinnaria is a bilaterally symmetrical starfish larva with two cilia bands, one at the front of the mouth and one at its back, for feeding and movement respectively. The brachiolaria stage is the second stage in the larval sequence of asteroids. Characterisation of this stage is by the possession of three short arms and movement via the external cilia. Shade is a significant environmental cue for metamorphosis from larval stage to adult starfish, which in itself takes 5–6 days. The cycle from egg to mature starfish takes, on average, two months to complete, although this is dependent on environmental conditions such as water temperature. The cycle of Patiriella regularis depends on particular environmental signals to become induced. The starfish gather in groups prior to spawning to increase the chance of fertilisation, a behavioural factor that impacts their reproductive success.

=== Diet and foraging ===
Patiriella regularis is an omnivore that predominantly feeds on crustose coralline algae and microorganisms. It can act as a detritivore and consume dead flesh of other organisms. Carrion is an important part of the diet of this asteroid and is linked to increased growth rates and reproduction. Common prey includes sponges, annelids, gastropods, bivalves, crustaceans and ascidians. Patiriella regularis regularly competes with other organisms such as whelk over shared resources, specifically mussel flesh. This starfish can prey on small organisms such as gastropods and can also feed on the Elminius modestus barnacle. Diet and energy intake is key to population survival, with a direct link between well fed populations and increased growth rate and gonad activity. Populations with surplus feeding resources can reach breeding maturity within a year of metamorphosis, despite the usual time taking three years.

The digestive system starts with the mouth that directly leads to the cardiac stomach. In a relaxed state the cardiac stomach is gathered in folds within the body. Patiriella regularis can evert its stomach to digest substrate externally, with the degree of eversion dependent on the food type and therefore determined by the environment and substrate type. Circumferential fibres separate the ventral cardiac stomach from the pyloric stomach, which is the second compartment that is responsible for further digesting what the cardiac stomach partially digests.

=== Predators, parasites and diseases ===
Mass mortality of Patiriella regularis is often due to a disease commonly coined 'sea star wasting disease', scientifically referred to as 'asteroid idiopathic wasting syndrome'. Investigation of infected individuals revealed they were inhabited by a host of copiotrophic bacteria - bacteria that consumes organic matter rapidly. This indicates that sea-star 'wasting' is not necessarily a virus; it is a result of a congregation of organic matter that encourages microbial respiration. This results in oxygen depletion in the outer asteroid tissue responsible for diffusion and respiration. Research suggests that Patiriella regulari's is host to a great diversity of undiscovered microbes of varying parasitic and symbiotic relationships.

Mesomycetozoea are a small clade of opisthokonta and are parasites of many aquatic species. They were identified in the epidermal cells of Patiriella regularis and found widespread in coastal habitats of New Zealand; thus they are predicted to be a regularly occurring inhabitant of the sea star. This eukaryote can form dermal infections due to their occurrence in epidermal tissues. Patiriella regularis is preyed on by a variety of larger organisms such as fish, rays, shorebirds, crabs and other Asteroid species. Sea stars in the larval stages of bipinnaria and brachiolaria are particularly at risk of predation.

== Research ==
There is a genetic variance between P. regularis from the North and South of New Zealand. Geographic barriers and coastal upwellings might keep various types of P. regularis from being able to spread or comingle.

== Cultural uses ==
Patiriella regularis is not used specifically for cultural purposes, however, it does play an important role in aquatic ecosystems and can be used as an indicator of water quality.
