= Chantal Conand =

French marine biologist

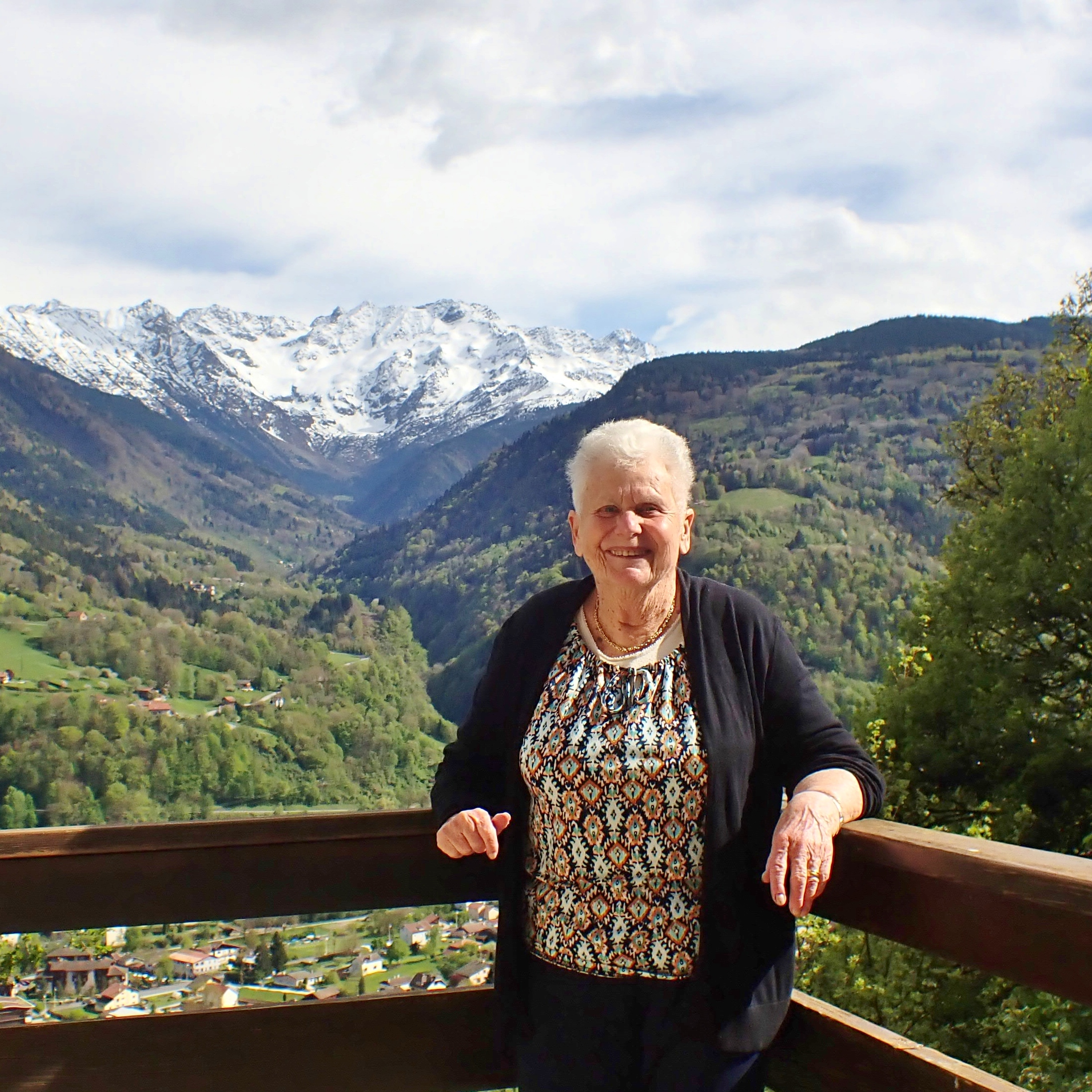
- Born: 10 April 1943 (age 83)
- Education: University of Western Brittany (PhD)
- Occupation: Marine biologist

Chantal Conand (born 10 April 1943) is a French marine biologist and oceanographer.

== Biography ==
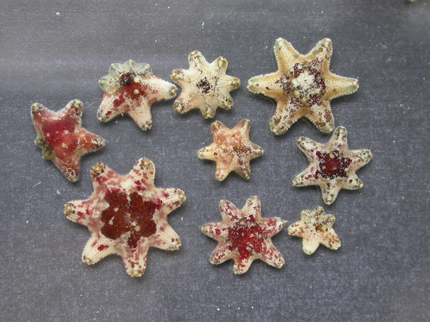
A group of Aquilonastra conandae stars found on Reunion Island named in honor of Conand.

Conand obtained her PhD in biological oceanography at University of Western Brittany in Brest in 1988. Her thesis focused on Aspidochirotida of the New Caledonia Barrier Reef (French: Les Holothuries aspidochirotes du lagon de Nouvelle-Calédonie). In January 1993, she joined the marine ecology laboratory (ECOMAR) at the University of La Réunion and eventually became its chief scientist. Her expertise extends to all echinoderms of the Indo-Pacific, but her work has focused on sea cucumbers, but also on other echinoderms of la Réunion. Her other work has included studies of the crown-of-thorns starfish, which preys upon hard, or stony, coral polyps (Scleractinia). She was a member of the scientific committee of the Western Indian Ocean Marine Science Association from 2001 to 2004. She has since retired and become emeritus faculty.

== Selected works ==
Her works include more than thirty books or book chapters and over 100 peer-reviewed articles and reports.

=== Books ===
- Organisation des Nations Unies pour l'alimentation et l'agriculture; Chantal Conand (1986). Les ressources halieutiques des pays insulaires du Pacifique. Deuxième partie, Les holothuries (PDF). Rome: FAO. ISBN 92-5-202508-1.
- Chantal Conand (1988). Les Holothuries aspidochirotes du lagon de Nouvelle-Calédonie [Microforme]:biologie, écologie et exploitation. Grenoble 2: ANRT.
- Chantal Conand (1989). "Les Holothuries aspidochirotes du lagon de Nouvelle-Calédonie [Microforme]:biologie, écologie et exploitation". Migration et Urbanisation: La Cas de la Côte d'Ivoire. Bondy: Ed. de l'ORSTOM: 393. ISSN 0767-2888.
- Alessandro Lovatelli; Chantal Conand (2004). Advances in Sea Cucumber Aquaculture and Management. Food & Agriculture Org. pp. 425.
- Chantal Conand; Nyawira Muthiga (2007). Commercial Sea Cucumbers: A Review for the Western Indian Ocean. WIOMSA Book Series. p. 66.
- Purcell, Steven W.; Samyn, Yves; Conand, Chantal (2012). Commercially important sea cucumbers of the world. Rome: FAO Species Catalogue for Fishery Purposes No. 6. p. 233. ISBN 978-92-5-106719-2..

=== Papers ===
- Conand, Chantal (1984). "Distribution, reproductive cycle and morphometric relationships of Acanthaster planci in New Caledonia". Proceedings of the 5th International Echinoderm Conference, Galway: 499–506.
- Conand, Chantal (2001). "Acanthaster Acanthaster planci". Bull. Nat., Hist. & Géo., Mayotte (in French) (5): 26–29..
- Chantal Conand; Pascale Cuet; Odile Naïm; Dominique Mioche (August 2002). "Des coraux sous surveillance". Pour la Science (in French) (298).
- Stöhr, Sabine; Conand, Chantal; Boissin, Emilie (2008). "Brittle stars (Echinodermata: Ophiuroidea) from La Réunion and the systematic position of Ophiocanops Koehler, 1922". Zoological Journal of the Linnean Society. 153 (3): 545–560. doi:10.1111/j.1096-3642.2008.00401.x..
- Uthicke, Sven; Byrne, Maria; Conand, Chantal (2010). "Genetic barcoding of commercial Bêche-de-mer species (Echinodermata: Holothuroidea)". Molecular Ecology Resources. 10 (4): 634–46. doi:10.1111/j.1755-0998.2009.02826.x. PMID 21565068. S2CID 19614500..
- Purcell, S. W.; Mercier, A.; Conand, Chantal; Hamel, J. F.; Toral-Granda, M. V.; Lovatelli, A.; Uthicke, S. (2011). "Sea cucumber fisheries: global analysis of stocks, management measures and drivers of overfishing". Fish and Fisheries. 14: 34–59. doi:10.1111/j.1467-2979.2011.00443.x..

== Honour ==
Two species of Starfishes are dedicated to her: Aquilonastra conandae et Aquilonastra chantalae.
