= Timothy R. McClanahan =

Timothy R. McClanahan (born 1957 in New Haven, Connecticut) is a biologist and a senior conservation zoologist at the Wildlife Conservation Society (WCS) and is known for his work on the ecology of coral reefs. He lives and works in Mombasa, Kenya, where he studies the marine tropical ecosystems of the western Indian Ocean, and is the director of the WCS coral reefs program for eastern Africa.

== Education and career ==
McClanahan received his bachelor's degree with honours in 1981, from the department of biology at the University of California, Santa Cruz. He completed his master of sciences in 1984 and later his doctorate of philosophy at the University of Florida, in 1990, under the chairmanship of the ecologist Professor Howard T. Odum.

In 1991, he started his work as a conservation zoologist, initially at the Coral Reefs Conservation Project and later under the Wildlife Conservation Society, where he is still working as a senior conservation zoologist based in Kenya.

He is also member on editorial boards of a number of international journals, such as "Conservation Biology", Marine Ecology Progress Series, Ecosystems, Environmental Conservation, Global Change Biology, and Aquatic Conservation.

== Works ==
McClanahan has been working principally on coral reef ecology, most notably for the western Indian Ocean region (especially the African coast and Kenya), including interdisciplinary work about the effects of human activity like fishing on marine ecosystems.

He has published over 200 articles in peer-reviewed journals, thirty book chapters, edited four books, compiled seven symposium papers, and produced numerous other publications including popular articles, editorials, and book reviews. According to an evaluation by the International Scientific Information that summarizes the scientific literature, he is the second most cited coral reef scientist in the past 10 years.

== Honours and fellowships ==
McClanahan has been awarded:

- Pew Fellows Program in Marine Conservation in 1996
- Pew Fellows award for the most published fellow in 2002
- Fellow of the Western Indian Ocean Marine Science Association in 2005

He is also a member of the American Association for the Advancement of Science, American Institute for Biological Sciences, American Society of Naturalists, East African Wildlife Society, Ecological Society of America, the Western Indian Ocean Marine Science Association, and the International Science for Reef Studies.

== Selected publications ==
- Boris Worm, Ray Hilborn, Julia K. Baum, Trevor A. Branch, Jeremy S. Collie, Christopher Costello, Michael J. Fogarty, Elizabeth A. Fulton, Jeffrey A. Hutchings, Simon Jennings, Olaf P. Jensen, Heike K. Lotze, Pamela M. Mace, Tim R. McClanahan, Cóilín Minto, Stephen R. Palumbi, Ana M. Parma, Daniel Ricard, Andrew A. Rosenberg, Reg Watson, Dirk Zeller, 2009. Rebuilding global fisheries, Science 325 (5940), 578-585
- A. C. Baker, C. J. Starger, T. R. McClanahan, P. W. Glynn, 2004. Coral reefs: corals' adaptive response to climate change, Nature 430 (7001), 741-741
- Graham, N., T. R. McClanahan, Y. Letourner, and R. Galzin. 2007. Anthropogenic stressors, inter-specific competition and ENSO effects on a Mauritian coral reef. Environmental Biology of Fish 78:57-69.
- McClanahan, T. R. 2007. Achieving sustainability in East African coral reefs. Journal of the Marine Science and Environment C5:13-16.
- McClanahan, T. R. 2007. Testing for correspondence between coral reef invertebrate diversity and marine park designation on the Masoala Peninsula of eastern Madagascar. Aquatic Conservation: Marine and Freshwater Ecosystems 17:409-419.
- McClanahan, T. R., and J. Cinner. A framework for adaptive gear and ecosystem-based management in the artisanal coral reef fishery of Papua New Guinea. Aquatic Conservation: Marine and Freshwater Ecosystems
- McClanahan, T. R., M. Ateweberhan, C. R. Sebastian, N. A. J. Graham, S. K. Wilson, M. M. M. Guillaume, and J. H. Bruggemann. 2007. Western Indian Ocean coral communities: bleaching responses and susceptibility to extinction. Marine Ecology Progress Series 337:1-13.
- McClanahan, T. R., M. Ateweberhan, C. Ruiz Sebastian, N. A. J. Graham, S. K. Wilson, J. H. Bruggemann, and M. M. M. Guillaume. 2007. Predictability of coral bleaching from synoptic satellite and in situ temperature observations. Coral Reefs 26:695-701.
- McClanahan, T. R., N. A. J. Graham, J. M. Calnan, and M. A. MacNeil. 2007. Towards pristine biomass: reef fish recovery in coral reef marine protected areas in Kenya. Ecological Applications 17:1055-1067.
- McClanahan, T. R., N. A. J. Graham, J. Maina, P. Chabanet, J. H. Bruggemann, and N. Polunin. 2007. Influence of instantaneous variation on estimates of coral reef fish populations and communities. Marine Ecology Progress Series 340:221-234.
- Pratchett, M. S., C. N. Munday, S. K. Wilson, N. A. Graham, J. E. Cinner, D. R. Bellwood, G. P. Jones, N. V. C. Polunin, and T. R. McClanahan. in press. Effects of climate-induces coral bleaching on coral-reef fishes: ecological and economic consequences. Oceanography and Marine Biology: an Annual Review.
- Cinner, J. E., and T. R. McClanahan. 2006. Socioeconomic factors that lead to overfishing in small-scale coral reef fisheries of Papua New Guinea. Environmental Conservation.
- Cinner, J., M. J. Marnane, T. R. McClanahan, and G. R. Almany. 2006. Periodic closures as adaptive coral reef management in the Indo-Pacific. Ecology and Society
- McClanahan, T. R., S. Mwaguni, and N. A. Muthiga. 2005. Management of the Kenyan coast. Ocean & Coastal Management
- T. R. McClanahan and N. A. J. Graham. 2005. Recovery trajectories of coral reef fish assemblages within Kenyan marine protected areas. Marine Ecology Progress Series 294:241-248
- McClanahan, T. R. 2003. The near future of coral reefs. Environmental Conservation 29(4): 460-483
- McClanahan, T. R. 2002. A comparison of the ecology of shallow subtidal gastropods between western Indian Ocean and Caribbean coral reefs. Coral Reefs 21(4): 399-406
- McClanahan, T. R., J. Maina, L. Pet-Soede and L. Ambio. 2002. Effects of the 1998 Coral Morality Event on Kenyan Coral Reefs and Fisheries. (book, 550p)
- McClanahan, T. R. and S. Mangi. 2001. The effect of a closed area and beach seine exclusion on coral reef fish catches. Fisheries Management and Ecology 8(2): 107-122
- McClanahan, T. R., M. McField, M. Huitric, K. Bergman, E. Sala, M. Nystrom, I. Nordemar, T. Elfwing and N. A. Muthiga. 2001. Responses of algae, corals and fish to the reduction of macroalgae in fished and unfished patch reefs of Glovers Reef Atoll, Belize. Coral Reefs 19(4): 367-379
- McClanahan, T. R., N. A. Muthiga, S. Mangi. 2001. Coral and algal changes after the 1998 coral bleaching: interaction with reef management and herbivores on Kenyan reefs. Coral Reefs 19(4): 380-391
- McClanahan, T. R., R. Arthur. 2001. The effect of marine reserves and habitat on populations of East African coral reef fishes. Ecological Applications 11(2): 559-569
- McClanahan, T. R. 2000. Recovery of a coral reef keystone predator, Balistapus undulatus, in East African marine parks. Biological conservation 94(2): 191
- McClanahan, T. R., Obura, D. O., Sheppard, C. (editors). 2000. Coral Reefs of the Indian Ocean: Their Ecology and Conservation. Oxford University Press, NY, pp. 525
- McClanahan, T. R. 1998. In living coral color. Wildlife Conservation 101(4): 28
- McClanahan, T. R. 1997. Empty ark? Swara 20(2): 7
- McClanahan, T. R. 1997. Letter from under the sea. The Wildlife Conservation Magazine 100(2): 6-7
- McClanahan, T. R. 1997. Monitoring - the state of our art. Reef Encounter 20:9-11
- McClanahan, T. R. and B. Kaunda-Arara. 1996. Fishery recovery in a coral-reef marine park and its effect on the adjacent fishery. Conservation Biology 10(4): 1187
- McClanahan, T. R. and T. P. Young (eds.). 1996. East African Ecosystems and Their Conservation. Oxford University Press, UK
- McClanahan, T. R. 1995. A coral reef ecosystem-fisheries model: Impacts of fishing intensity and catch selection on reef structure and processes. Ecological Modelling 80(1): 1
- McClanahan, T. R. 1995. Fish predators and scavengers of the sea urchin Echinometra mathaei in Kenyan coral-reef marine parks. Environmental Biology of Fishes 43:187-193
- McClanahan, T. R. and D. Obura. 1995. Status of Kenyan coral reefs. Coastal Management 23:57-76
- McClanahan, T. R. 1994. Kenyan coral reef lagonal fishes: Associations with reef management, complexity, and sea urchins. Coral Reefs 13:231-241
