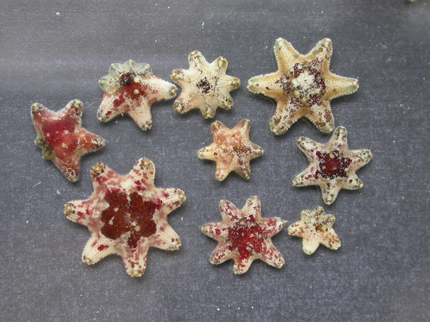

Scientific classification
- Domain: Eukaryota
- Kingdom: Animalia
- Phylum: Echinodermata
- Class: Asteroidea
- Order: Valvatida
- Family: Asterinidae
- Genus: Aquilonastra
- Species: A. conandae

Binomial name
- Aquilonastra conandae O'Loughlin & Rowe, 2006

= Aquilonastra conandae =

Species of starfish

Aquilonastra conandae is a species of starfish from the family Asterinidae found near the Mascarene Islands in the Indian Ocean. It is known for its asexual reproduction and is fissiparous. It is a small starfish, discrete and camouflaged, and occurs in coral reefs in the surf zone of large waves. The species was described in 2006 by Australian marine biologists P. Mark O'Loughlin and Francis Winston Edric Rowe, and gets its name from Chantal Conand.

== Description ==
It is a very small starfish, less than 2 cm (0.79 in), with seven or eight short, rounded arms, often irregular in length. This is due to its potential of regeneration, but also to its ability to reproduce through fissiparity. The arms measure 5 mm (0.20 in) in length, and the starfish has multiple madreporites and a single spine on the interradial plates. Solitary papules are present on the top of the starfish. Spikes are present and are rough, granular, and crystalline, and are conical and prominent on the arms. It has an irregular pattern of colours, showing a grey-beige background with granular patterns of reddish or greenish.

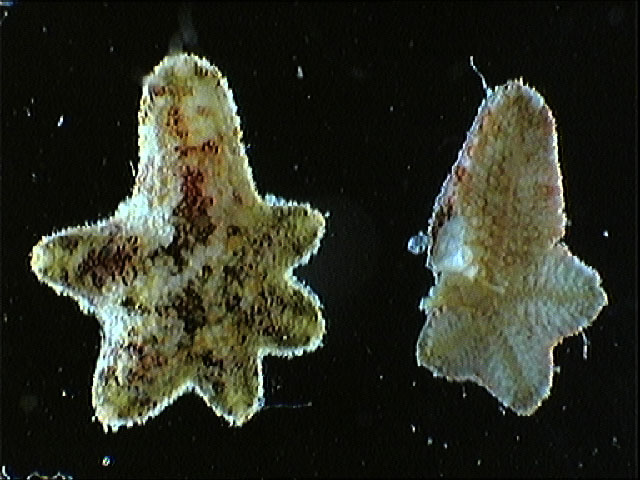
Aboral and oral faces.

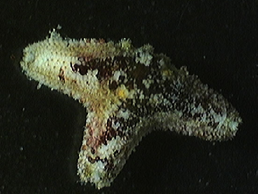
A recently divided specimen

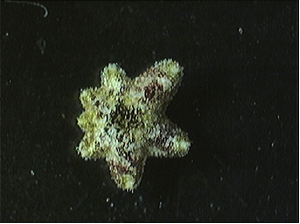
Regenerating specimen (probably after division)

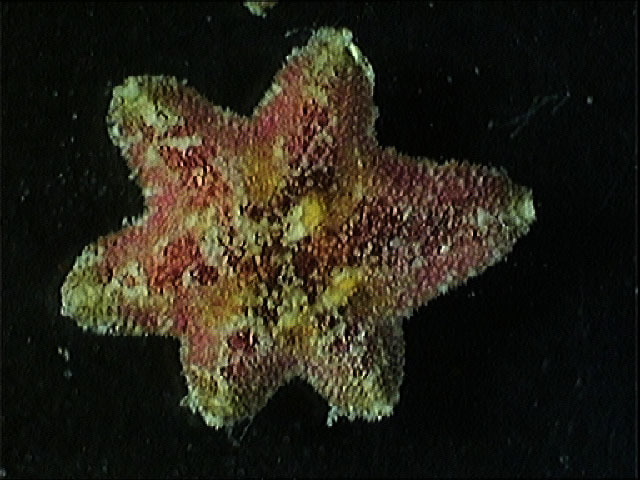
Regenerated specimen, with an irregular shape

== Ecology and behaviour ==
A. conandae reproduces by fission in addition to sexual reproduction, which takes place at the beginning of the summer. The gonopores (genital openings) are located on the upper side, and the observed sex ratio is 52 males per 93 females, but some specimens are hermaphrodites.

== Distribution ==
This species was first spotted at Réunion Island (south-tropical Indian Ocean) at the breakers on a coral reef at a section known as the "Watering Hole" (south of La Saline les Bains), where it is abundant. It was later identified in all the Mascarenes (mainly Mauritius and Rodrigues), where it occurs between the surface and 10 m (33 ft) but more often on the reef front and rocky cliffs, but also on volcanic flows.

== Systematics ==
This species was described in 2006 by P. Mark O'Loughlin and Francis Winston Edric Rowe, on the basis of material collected by Chantal Conand at Réunion Island, after whom it was named. Its type specimen was collected in Trou d'Eau and is located in the National Museum of Natural History of France under the registration "IE-2013-2489". The genus name Aquilonastra comes from Latin aquilonis (meaning northern), and astra (meaning star), referring to the fact that this genus of starfish is found in the northern part of the Indo-Pacific.

A similar species, also fissiparous, was discovered on Europa Island in the Mozambique Channel, and was described in 2013 as Aquilonastra chantalae.
