= Sustainable Seas Trust =

Non-profit organisation in South Africa

Sustainable Seas Trust (SST) is a South African non-profit organisation based in Gqeberha, Eastern Cape, focused on marine conservation and the reduction of plastic pollution. The organisation operates as a science-based entity, working across research, education, and community-based initiatives to address marine litter, support waste management systems, and contribute to sustainable coastal development in Africa.

== History ==
Sustainable Seas Trust was conceptualised through discussions among partner countries participating in the African Coelacanth Ecosystem Programme (ACEP) and established in 2006 as an independent non-profit organisation. The trust was intended to serve as a coordinating mechanism to support marine research, conservation, and transboundary collaboration across the Western Indian Ocean region. According to a United Nations-hosted abstract, its establishment formed part of broader efforts to develop long-term solutions for coastal communities in the region.

In 2014, the organisation was involved in marine conservation initiatives in South Africa linked to the global Hope Spots programme, working in collaboration with marine conservationist Sylvia Earle and Mission Blue. Several coastal areas in South Africa were designated as “Community Hope Spots”, including sites in Algoa Bay and along the Western and Southern Cape coasts. The initiative involved collaboration between researchers, government representatives, civil society organisations, and local communities, with SST contributing to coordination and local implementation.

Alongside its national activities, SST has contributed to regional and international initiatives addressing marine pollution and ocean governance through collaboration with academic institutions, governments, and international organisations.

== Research and scientific contributions ==
SST has contributed to research on marine litter, pollution pathways, and contaminant exposure in coastal environments.

The organisation has been involved in regional marine litter monitoring initiatives, including coordination of monitoring activities across the Western Indian Ocean region, and contributed to the development of guidance and methodologies for marine litter monitoring in Africa. Research associated with SST has examined marine litter accumulation and composition along the South African coastline, including baseline assessments of litter density and distribution.

Additional studies involving SST-affiliated researchers have investigated pollutants such as heavy metals, bisphenols, and ultraviolet filters in marine organisms, including mussels collected from Algoa Bay.

Research has also included the use of unmanned aerial vehicles (UAVs) to assess land-based litter in coastal environments.

== Policy and international collaboration ==
SST has contributed to regional and international policy development on marine litter and plastic pollution.

In collaboration with the Western Indian Ocean Marine Science Association (WIOMSA) and under the supervision of the United Nations Environment Programme (UNEP), SST contributed to a study on marine litter legislation in Africa, including a gap analysis and technical guidelines to support policy development.

SST has also participated in national and international workshops and collaborative initiatives on marine plastic pollution, including activities linked to the Commonwealth Litter Programme.

== Community-based programmes ==
SST implements and evaluates community-based programmes focused on reducing marine litter and improving waste management in coastal and urban environments, with approaches that can be adapted for use in other African contexts.

These approaches have been incorporated into the organisation’s primary programme, Operation Clean Spot (OCS), launched in Nelson Mandela Bay in 2021. The programme focuses on reducing land-based litter through community participation, including collaboration with municipalities, schools, households, and informal waste collectors.

The initiative includes environmental education, waste separation at source, support for informal waste collectors, and data collection to monitor outcomes. SST’s education initiatives form part of OCS and include the Munch on the Move programme, a school-based recycling initiative piloted in Nelson Mandela Bay. Media coverage has described OCS as a model designed for African contexts.

== Public engagement and partnerships ==
SST has participated in public awareness campaigns and collaborative initiatives related to marine conservation and waste management.

During the COVID-19 pandemic, the organisation contributed to initiatives involving UNEP and South African stakeholders to promote responsible waste disposal.

SST has also contributed to the establishment and development of multi-stakeholder platforms, including the African Marine Network, which serves as a collaborative hub connecting government agencies, research institutions, industry, and civil society organisations to address marine pollution across Africa.

SST-affiliated researchers have contributed to public discussions on marine conservation challenges, and capacity building initiatives across the Western Indian Ocean Region.
