= Nyawira Muthiga =

African conservation zoologist and researcher

Nyawìra A. Mūthìga
- Born: Kenya
- Education: Florida State University; University of Nairobi
- Scientific career
- Workplaces: Western Indian Ocean Marine Science Association; Wildlife Conservation Society
- Thesis: The Role Of Early Life History Strategies On The Population Dynamics Of The Sea Urchin Echinometra Mathaei (de Blainville) On Reefs' In Kenya (1996)

Nyawìra A. Mūthìga is an African conservation zoologist who is Director of the Western Indian Ocean Marine Science Association Marine Programme in Kenya. She is a conservation scientist for the Wildlife Conservation Society.

== Early life and education ==
Mūthìga was born in Kenya, and spent part of her childhood in Dar es Salaam. She earned her undergraduate degree in biological oceanography in the United States. She completed her master's degree at the Florida State University, where she studied the impact of salinity on the photosynthesis of Siderastrea siderea. Mūthìga returned to Kenya for her doctoral research, where she joined the University of Nairobi.

== Research and career ==
In 2000 Mūthìga was elected president of the Western Indian Ocean Marine Science Association board of trustees (WIOMSA). She oversaw the growth of the WIOMSA internationally, building local chapters and networks. Mūthìga worked for the Kenya Wildlife Service where she led the coastal and wetland programme. In this capacity, Mūthìga was made of Chair of the Kenya Sea Turtle Conservation programme. She has worked to survey hundreds of different coral reefs on the Western Indian Ocean.

Mūthìga was a founder of the Wildlife Conservation Society coral reef programme, which researches and deploys programmes that can conserve coral reefs, as well as identifying novel ways to allow critical species to recover. The programme helps to protect 90% of the world's coral species and has surveyed almost 1,000 sites across the Indo-Pacific and Caribbean Sea. In 2007 Mūthìga joined the World Commission on Protected Areas as the Kenya coordinator. She has argued that to preserve coral reefs, social and environmental scientists must work together. She believes that the orange-lined triggerfish may play a crucial role in maintaining health corals.

Mūthìga was awarded the 2018 Banovich Wildscapes Foundation Award for Conservation Excellence (ACE) for her work on ocean conservation. In 2020 Eco Magazine named Mūthìga as one of the world's top coral reef researchers.

== Awards and honours ==
- 2005 National Geographic Society/Buffett Award for Leadership
- 2018 Award for Conservation Excellence
- 2020 Eco Magazine Top Coral Reef Researcher
- 2020 Coral Reef Conservation Award

== Personal life ==
Mūthìga is married to American marine biologist Timothy McClanahan. She met him in the 1980s, when McClanahan was on a study-abroad programme in Kenya.

== Selected publications ==
- Hoegh-Guldberg, O.; Mumby, P. J.; Hooten, A. J.; Steneck, R. S.; Greenfield, P.; Gomez, E.; Harvell, C. D.; Sale, P. F.; Edwards, A. J.; Caldeira, K.; Knowlton, N. (2007-12-14). "Coral Reefs Under Rapid Climate Change and Ocean Acidification". Science. 318 (5857): 1737–1742. Bibcode:2007Sci...318.1737H. doi:10.1126/science.1152509. hdl:1885/28834. ISSN 0036-8075. PMID 18079392. S2CID 12607336.
- Koch, Evamaria W.; Barbier, Edward B.; Silliman, Brian R.; Reed, Denise J.; Perillo, Gerardo ME; Hacker, Sally D.; Granek, Elise F.; Primavera, Jurgenne H.; Muthiga, Nyawira; Polasky, Stephen; Halpern, Benjamin S. (2009). "Non-linearity in ecosystem services: temporal and spatial variability in coastal protection". Frontiers in Ecology and the Environment. 7 (1): 29–37. Bibcode:2009FrEE....7...29K. doi:10.1890/080126. hdl:11336/28652. ISSN 1540-9309. S2CID 53957452.
- McClanahan, Tim R.; Graham, Nicholas A. J.; MacNeil, M. Aaron; Muthiga, Nyawira A.; Cinner, Joshua E.; Bruggemann, J. Henrich; Wilson, Shaun K. (2011-10-11). "Critical thresholds and tangible targets for ecosystem-based management of coral reef fisheries". Proceedings of the National Academy of Sciences. 108 (41): 17230–17233. Bibcode:2011PNAS..10817230M. doi:10.1073/pnas.1106861108. ISSN 0027-8424. PMC 3193203. PMID 21949381.
