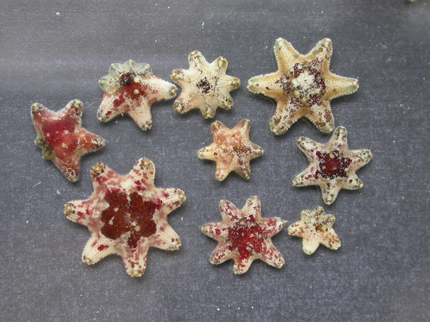
- Aquilonastra conandae

Scientific classification
- Kingdom: Animalia
- Phylum: Echinodermata
- Class: Asteroidea
- Order: Valvatida
- Family: Asterinidae
- Genus: Aquilonastra; O'Loughlin, 2004

Type species
- Asteriscus cepheus Müller and Troschel, 1842.

Species
- see text

= Aquilonastra =

Genus of starfishes

Aquilonastra is a genus of small sea stars within the family Asterinidae. It has over 20 described species.

== Description ==
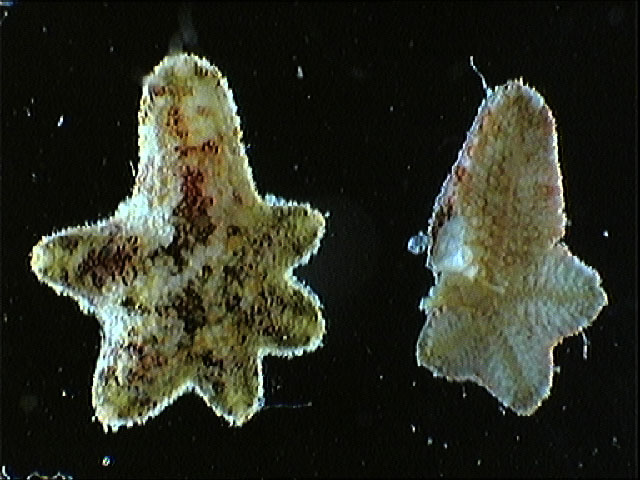
Aquilonastra conandae.

Aquilonastra has generally five rays, except fissiparous species which have five to eight ones. It looks like a star, as inter-radial margins are deeply incurved.

== List of species ==
According to World Register of Marine Species and O'Loughlin & Rowe 2006:

- Aquilonastra anomala (H.L. Clark, 1921)
- Aquilonastra batheri (Goto, 1914)
- Aquilonastra burtoni (Gray, 1840)
- Aquilonastra byrneae O'Loughlin & Rowe, 2006
- Aquilonastra cepheus (Muller & Troschel, 1842)
- Aquilonastra chantalae O'Loughlin & MacKenzie, 2013
- Aquilonastra colemani O'Loughlin & Rowe, 2006
- Aquilonastra conandae O'Loughlin & Rowe, 2006
- Aquilonastra corallicola (Marsh, 1977)
- Aquilonastra coronata (von Martens, 1866)
- Aquilonastra doranae O'Loughlin & Rowe, 2006
- Aquilonastra halseyae O'Loughlin & Rowe, 2006
- Aquilonastra heteractis (H.L. Clark, 1938)
- Aquilonastra iranica (Mortensen, 1940)
- Aquilonastra limboonkengi (Smith, 1927)
- Aquilonastra marshae O'Loughlin & Rowe, 2006
- Aquilonastra minor (Hayashi, 1974)
- Aquilonastra moosleitneri O'Loughlin & Rowe, 2006
- Aquilonastra oharai O'Loughlin & Rowe, 2006
- Aquilonastra richmondi O'Loughlin & Rowe, 2006
- Aquilonastra rosea (H.L. Clark, 1938)
- Aquilonastra rowleyi O'Loughlin & Rowe, 2006
- Aquilonastra samyni O'Loughlin & Rowe, 2006
- Aquilonastra scobinata (Livingstone, 1933)
- Aquilonastra shirleyae O'Loughlin, 2009
- Aquilonastra watersi O'Loughlin & Rowe, 2006
- Aquilonastra yairi O'Loughlin & Rowe, 2006

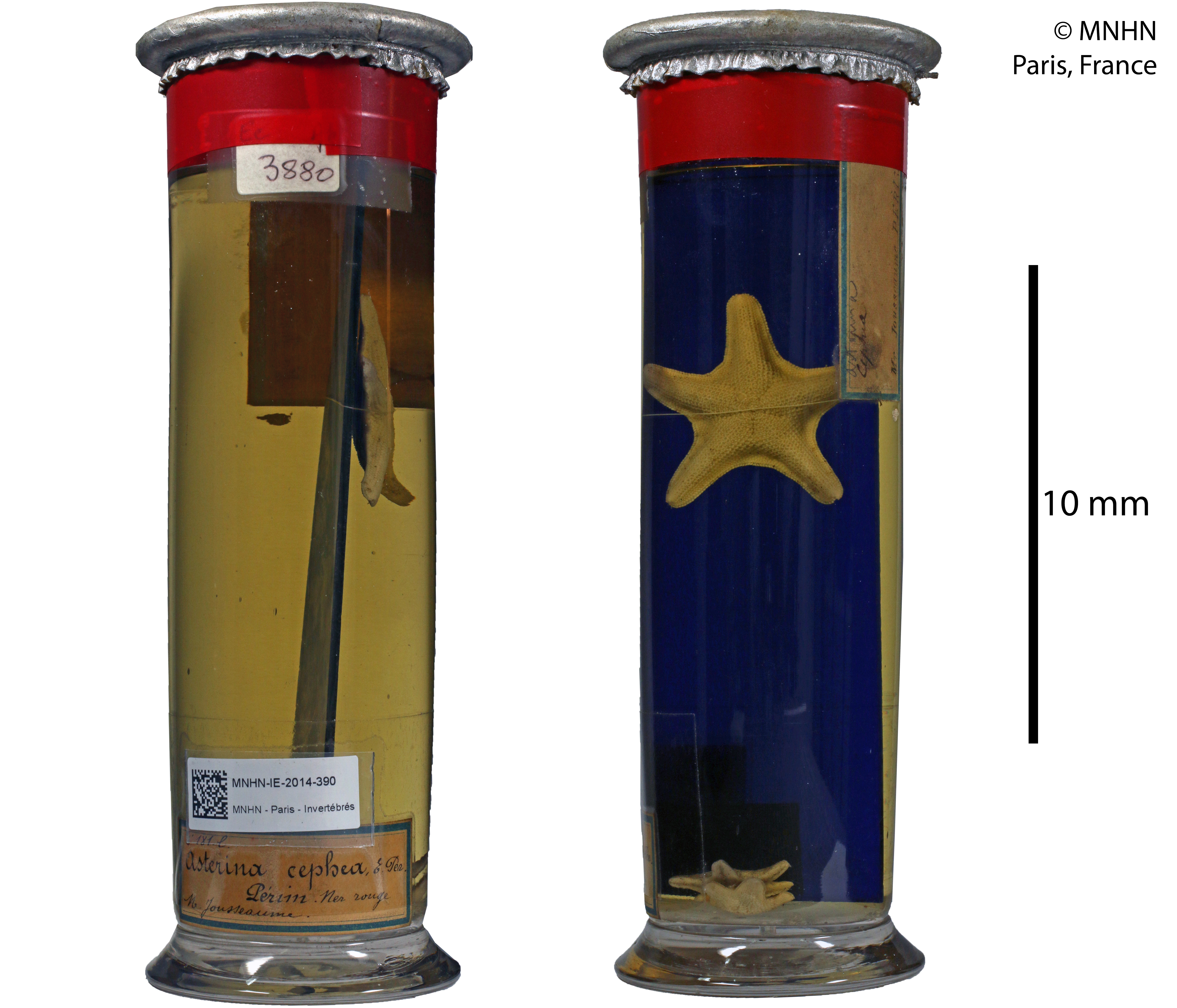
Aquilonastra cepheus from Red Sea (MNHN)

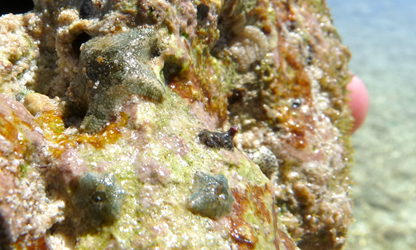
Aquilonastra chantalae in Europa Island.

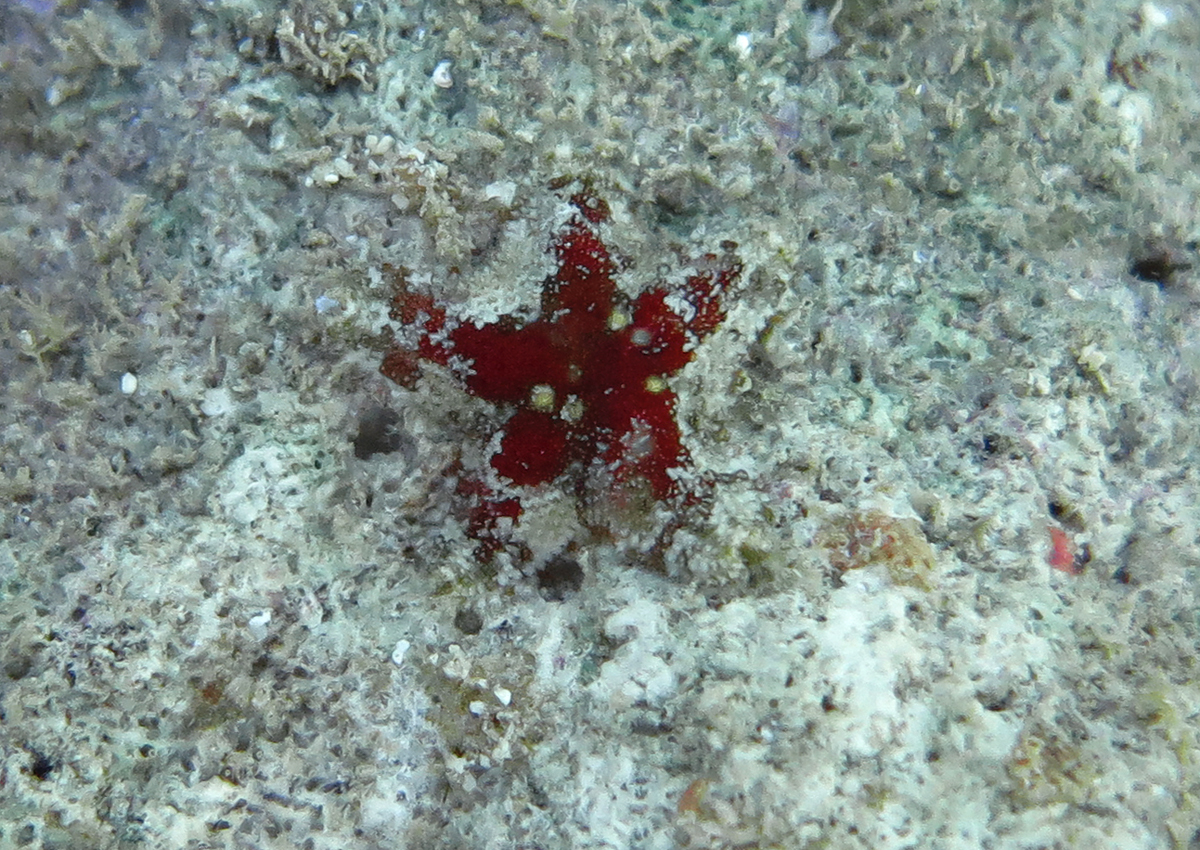
Aquilonastra conandae in Réunion island.

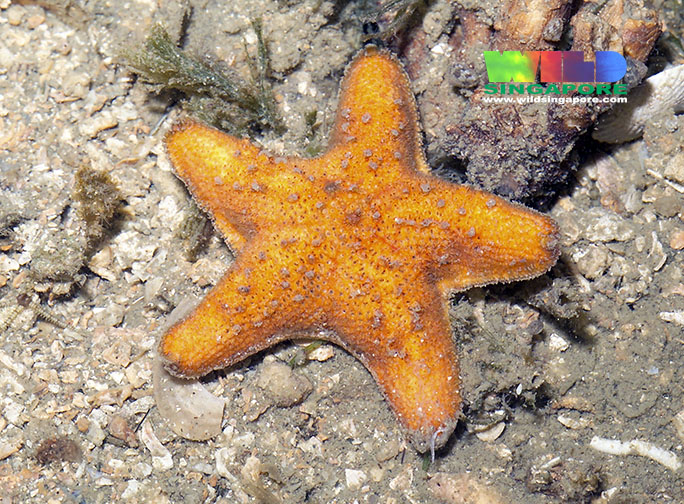
Aquilonastra coronata in Singapore.

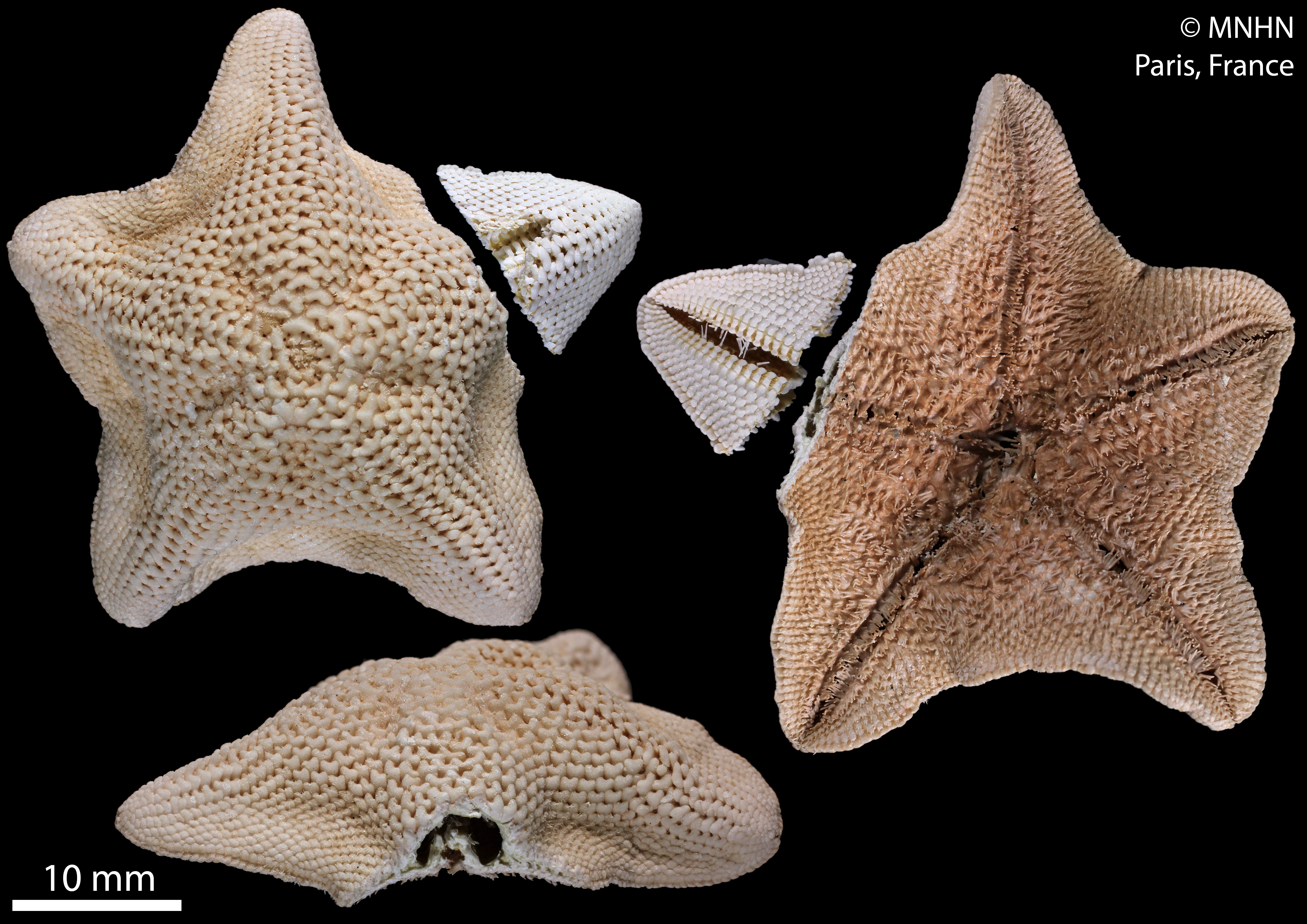
Aquilonastra donia from New Caledonia (MNHN)

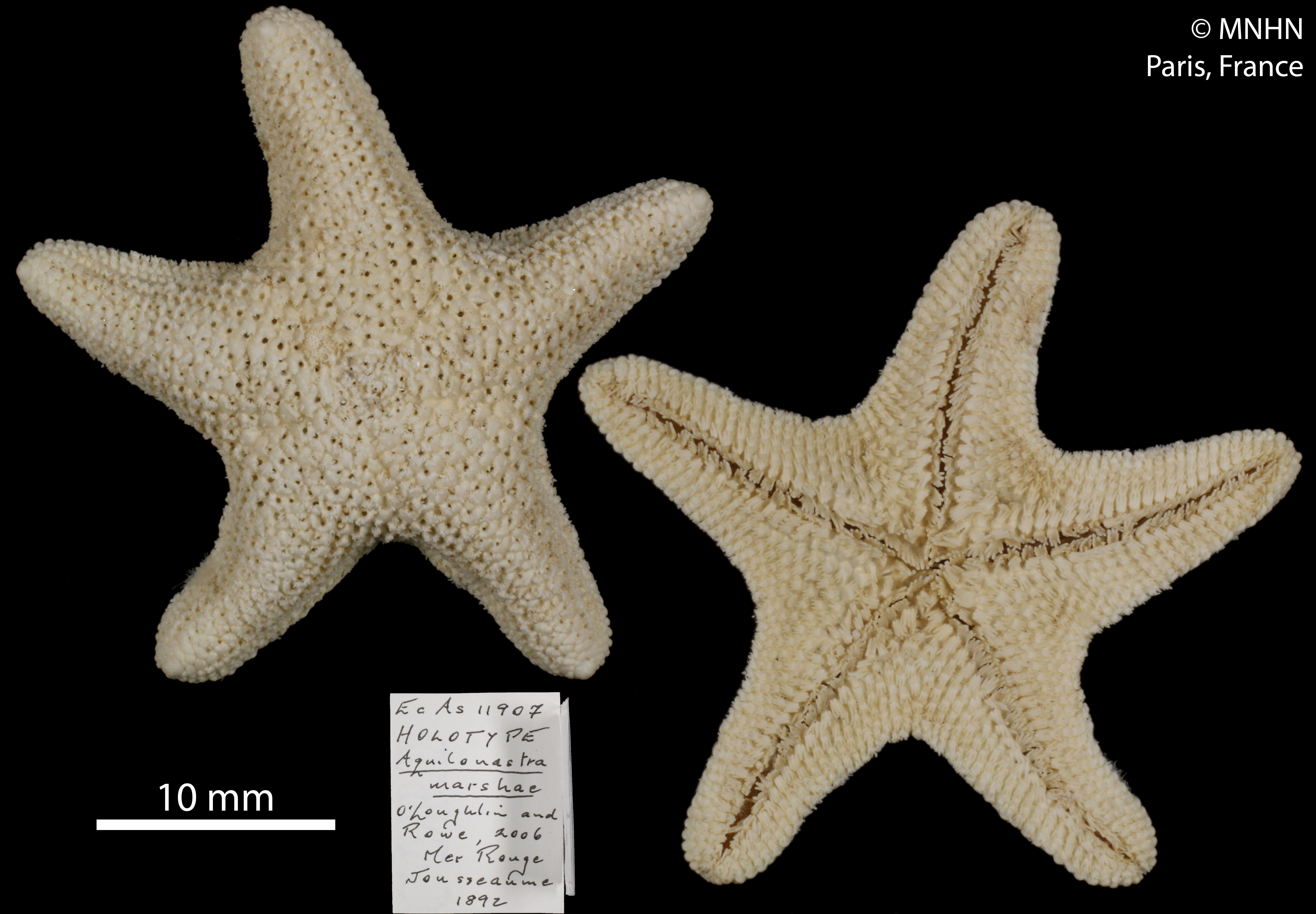
Aquilonastra marshae de Mer Rouge (MNHN)

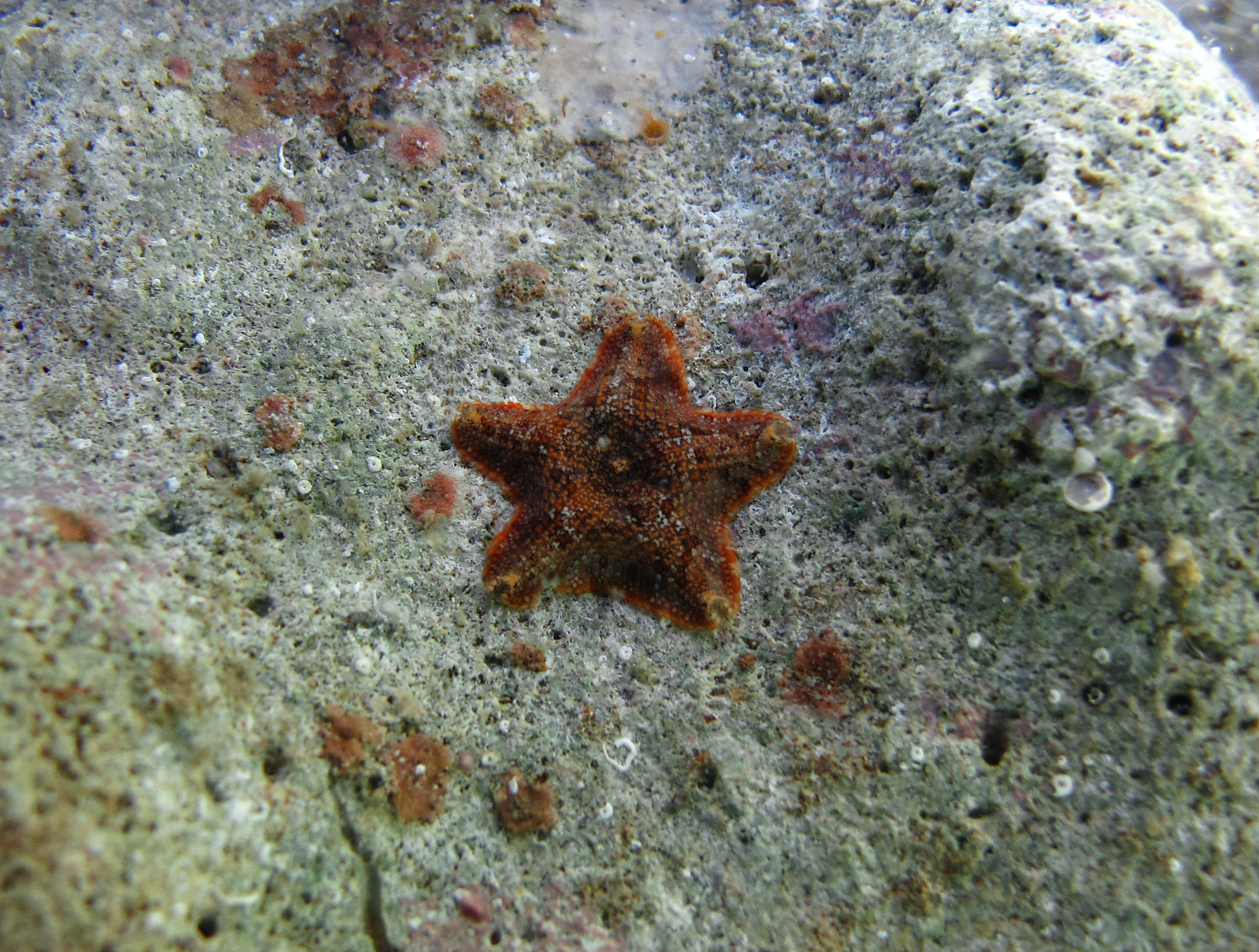
Probable Aquilonastra moosleitneri in Réunion island.

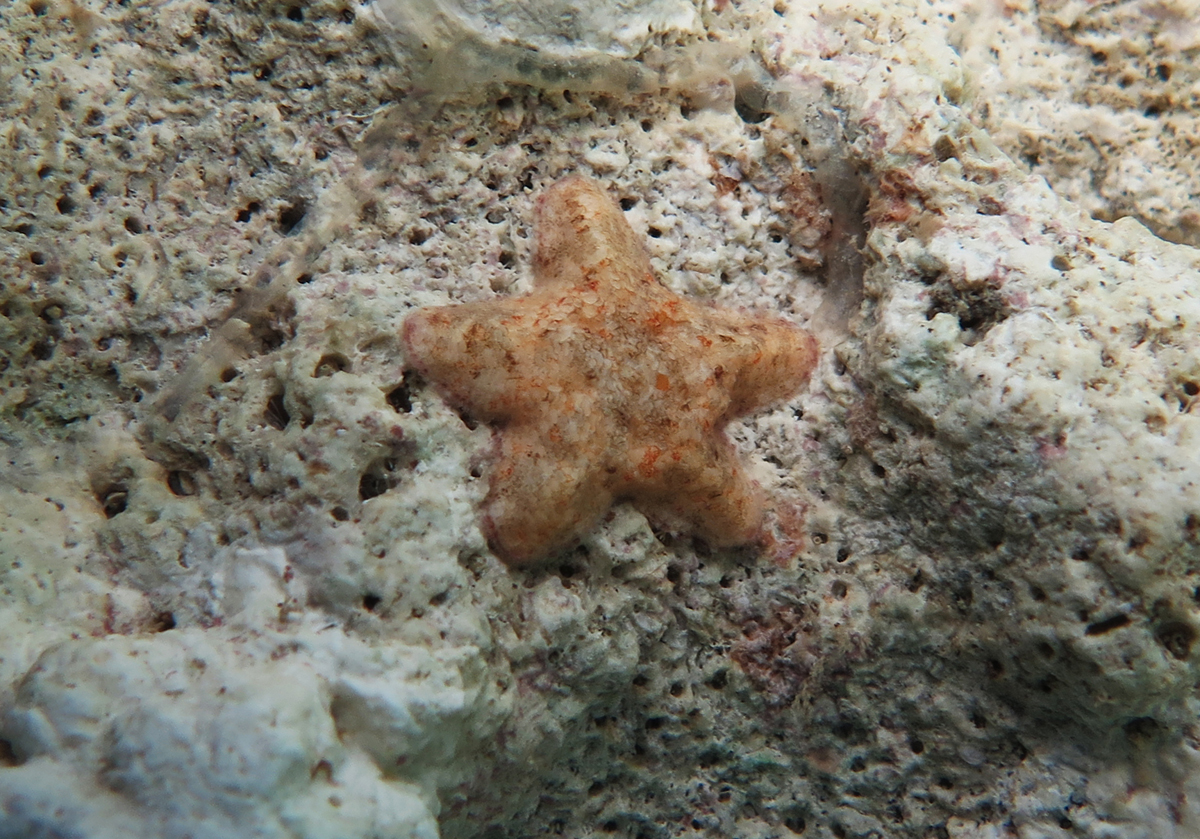
Probable Aquilonastra richmondi in Réunion island.

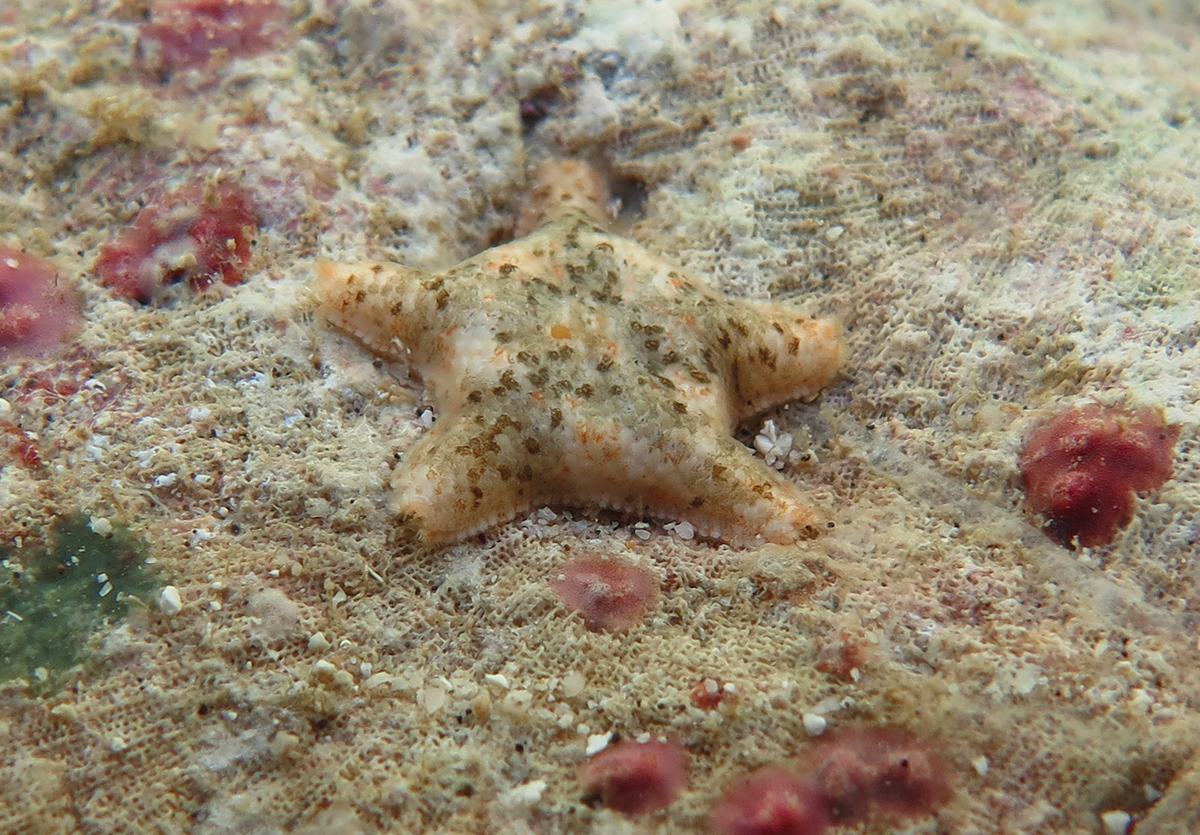
Probable Aquilonastra samyni in Réunion island.

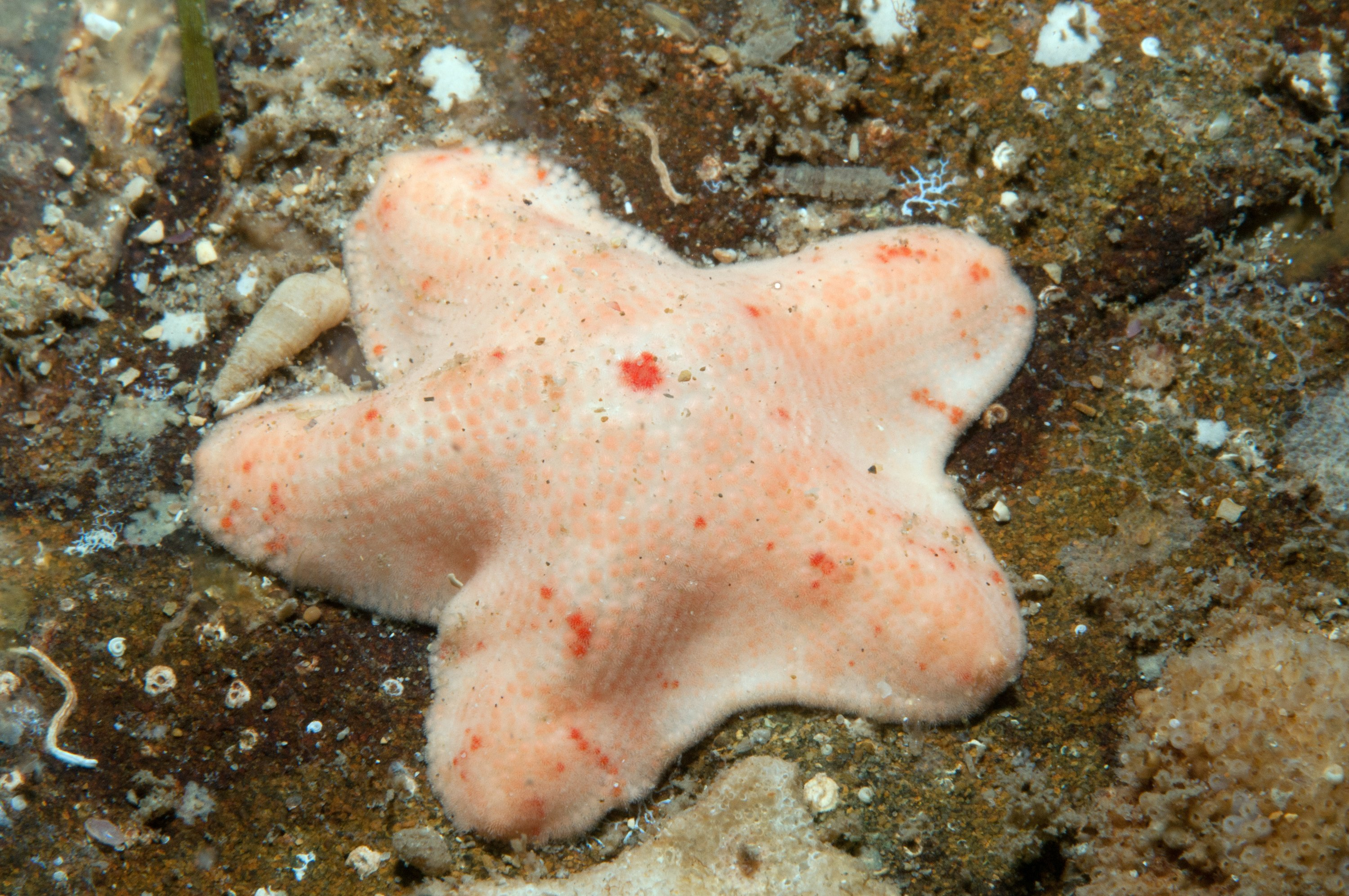
Aquilonastra scobinata in Australia.
