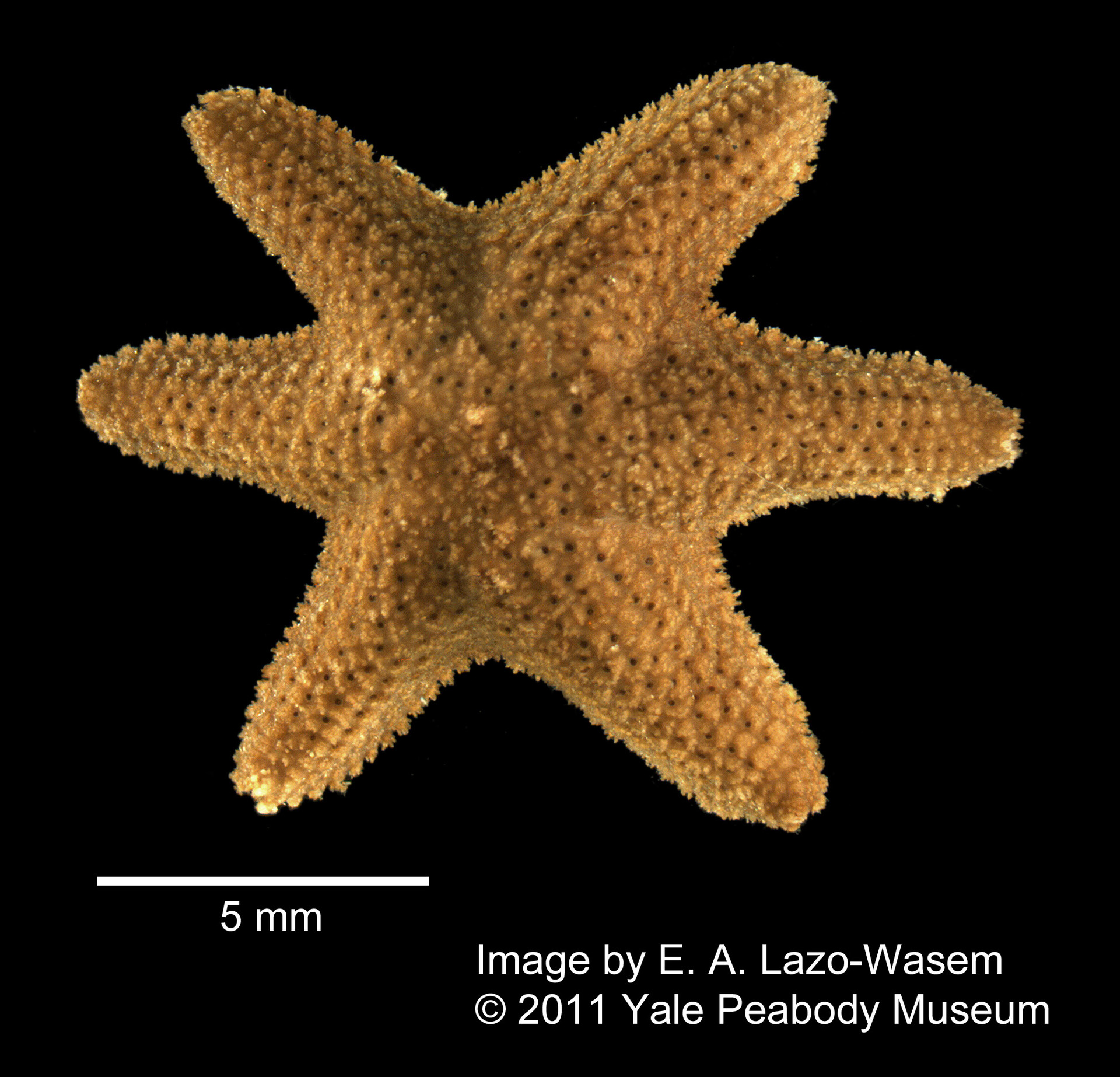

Scientific classification
- Kingdom: Animalia
- Phylum: Echinodermata
- Class: Asteroidea
- Order: Valvatida
- Family: Asterinidae
- Genus: Aquilonastra
- Species: A. burtoni

Binomial name
- Aquilonastra burtoni (Gray), 1840

Synonyms
- Asterina burtoni Gray, 1840; Asterina wega Perrier, 1875; Asteriscus wega Valenciennes, 1869

= Aquilonastra burtoni =

Species of starfish

Aquilonastra burtoni is a species of small sea star from the family Asterinidae from the Red Sea which has colonised the eastern Mediterranean by Lessepsian migration through the Suez Canal, although the Mediterranean populations are clonal reproducing through fissiparous asexual reproduction. It was originally described in 1840 by the English zoologist and philatelist John Edward Gray.

== Description ==
Aquilonastra burtoni is a small species of sea star with up to 8 rays, frequently 7, they frequently demonstrate an asymmetrical form after fissiparous division while the form of larger specimens is often symmetrical with 5 equal rays; there is an inconspicuous madreporite in most interradii. The rays narrow basally, tapering to a narrow rounded distal part which is finger-like. Each of the plates on the oral surface has a grouping of 3 crowded mobile tapering spines in their centres, while those of the dorsal surface have a dense group of short tubercles. It is a greenish gray colour on the dorsal sid with a large, irregular, purplish brown blotch in the centre which is surrounded by red spots at the bases of the arms. The arms are normally a darker greenish near their distal portions where there is also a pale median line.

== Distribution ==
The native range of Aquilonastra burtoni is the north western Indian Ocean including the Gulf of Suez, Gulf of Aqaba, the Red Sea, Persian Gulf, Sea of Oman and the coasts of eastern Africa south to Zanzibar. It has been reported from a wider range east to Hawaii and south to Madagascar but these records appear to refer to other similar Aquilonastra species. It was first recorded within the Suez Canal in 1926 and then in the eastern Mediterranean in 1966, and by 2010 it had been recorded from Cyprus.

== Biology ==
Aquilonastra burtoni is a benthic species which occurs in shallow waters between 0 and 10m in depth where is common in the lower shore below the low tide line under rock slabs and boulders. It is uncommon in the gravel tails and gravelly hydraulic banks, its preferred food seems to be the rich shade-loving animals that live underneath blacks and slabs, including sponges such as Spirastrella spp and Timea spp. or Ascidiacea, for example Trididemnum or Eudistoma.

In sexual reproduction the eggs and sperm are broadcast and the larvae are planktonic lecithotrophs, i.e. they rely on a yolk for their initial nutrition. In the fissiparous population off the Mediterranean coast of Israel histological examination showed spermatogenesis in all the mature individuals and the peak of sperm production was coincident with the peak of fissiparous reproduction. This has been taken to indicate that the origin of the Mediterranean colonisers was from a fissiparous population in the Red Sea.

== Taxonomy ==
Aquilonastra burtoni was originally named Asterina burtoni by John Edward Gray from specimens collected by a Mr John Burton in the Red Sea. A second species was named Asterina wega and this name was used to describe a separate multi armed form which reproduced by fissipary while A. burtoni was used for the five armed sexually reproducing form. Further studies have suggested that this is a complex of species with the three fissiparous Mediterranean populations named as Aquilonastra yairi sp. nov. and the specimens taken in the Gulf of Aqaba as A. burtonii sensu stricto while the non-fissiparous specimens from Eilat were described as Aquilonastra marshae sp. nov., with the caveat that populations elsewhere still have to be properly studied to determine their status.
