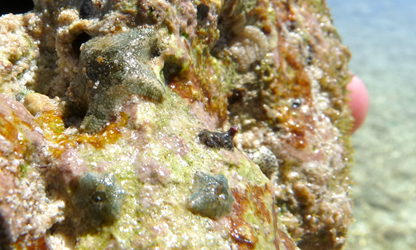

Scientific classification
- Domain: Eukaryota
- Kingdom: Animalia
- Phylum: Echinodermata
- Class: Asteroidea
- Order: Valvatida
- Family: Asterinidae
- Genus: Aquilonastra
- Species: A. chantalae

Binomial name
- Aquilonastra chantalae O'Loughlin & MacKenzie, 2013

= Aquilonastra chantalae =

Species of starfish

Aquilonastra chantalae is a species of starfish from the family Asterinidae. Asterinid sea stars are typically quite small with an often pentagonal-shaped body, though there are exceptions. They are dorsally flattened and have short arms. The body's thin periphery is built up by very small marginal plates. One distinct characteristic of those in this family is the presence of an aboral face shaped by crescent-like plates.

== Genus- Aquilonastra ==
Aquilonastra chantalae belongs to the genus Aquilonastra. Organisms within the genus Aquilonastra typically have five rays, commonly called arms. However, fissiparous species, those that reproduce by fission, can have from five to eight. Those of this genus resemble stars, with their inter-radial margins being incurved significantly.

== Description ==
Aquilonastra chantalae is a fissiparous Aquilonastra species that can have a radius up to a size of 4mm. Organisms of this species generally have 5–7 rays, with the most prominent number being 6 and the most rare being 7. The rays are discrete with a wide basal end and taper distally to the rounded end. At a radial size of 4mm, the star may have rays 5. On the other hand, smaller stars could have up to 7 rays. Specimens of this kind have mostly digitiform abactinal spinelets. They also have actinal interradial spines which are predominantly subsacciform.

== Biology ==
Though not much is known yet of the biological behaviors and properties specific to Aquilonastra chantalae, such information can be extrapolated from knowledge of the family of sea stars to which it belongs, Asterinidae. Most species of said family tend to live sequestered in crevices and under rocks. A great majority of Asterinidae, and likely Aquilonastra chantalae, feed on algal or bacterial mat and other floating fragments of food.

== Distribution ==
This species can be found within the Mozambique Channel on the island of Europa and other scattered islands. It can also be found in the Indian Ocean.

== Etymology ==
The species was named chantalae in reverence of the great contributions to the research of echinoderms done by Chantal Conand. Conand was a professor at the University of La Reunion.
