= Julia K. Baum =

Canadian marine biologist

Academic background
- Education: Bsc, McGill University; MSc, 2002, PhD, Biology, 2007, Dalhousie University

Academic work
- Institutions: University of Victoria

Julia Kathleen Baum (born 1976) is a Canadian marine biologist. In 2017, she was named to the Royal Society of Canada's College of New Scholars, Artists, and Scientists. She was awarded a Pew Fellowship in Marine Conservation in 2017 and an EWR Steacie Fellowship in 2018.

== Early life and education ==
Baum was born in 1976. She received her Bachelor of Science degree in biology from McGill University and enrolled at the University of British Columbia for her graduate degrees. Baum eventually transferred to Dalhousie University to work alongside Ransom A. Myers and complete her MSc and PhD. Baum wrote her thesis on the declining shark population and subsequently received the Governor General's Academic Medal. Upon graduating, Baum completed a two-year David H. Smith Conservation Research post-doctoral fellowship at Scripps Institution of Oceanography, followed by a Schmidt Ocean Institute postdoctoral fellowship at the National Center for Ecological Analysis and Synthesis.

== Career ==
In 2009, Baum began studying the effects that fishing practices have on coral reefs in Kiritimati. As a professor at the University of Victoria, she was named among 126 recipients of the 2012 Sloan Fellowships from the Alfred P. Sloan Foundation. The fellowship included a $50,000 grant, which she would use to explore the impact of fishing on the life of predatory species. Later that year, she was one of three co-organizers of the Ecology@UVic group to plan bi-weekly meetings for journal-group discussions and informal seminars on the topic of ecology. A few days later, Baum received A $72,000 grant from the Canada Foundation for Innovation to create a marine ecology and conservation centre.

Following the 2015–2016 Marine heatwave that caused mass coral bleaching and mortality on reefs around the world, Baum began researching how to assist the different species of reef fishes in recovering. As a result of her efforts, Baum was elected a Member of the Royal Society of Canada's College of New Scholars, Artists and Scientists and Pew Fellowship in Marine Conservation. She was also one of six university faculty members to be awarded the 2018 E.W.R. Steacie Memorial Fellowship from the Natural Sciences and Engineering Research Council of Canada for "outstanding and highly promising faculty who are earning a strong international reputation for original research."

During the COVID-19 pandemic, she co-authored a study in Ecological Applications which identified 170,000 individual fishes of 245 different species of reef fishes at 16 reefs on Christmas Island, before, during, and after the heatwave. Later, Baum led the first study that found the reefs could recover from the bleaching when they were not simultaneously exposed to other types of human-caused stressors, such as water pollution. In July 2020, Baum released a study claiming that sharks were "functionally extinct" in nearly 20 per cent of the world's coral reefs.
