= Western Indian Ocean Marine Science Association =

Nongovernmental organization

Western Indian Ocean Marine Science Association (WIOMSA)
- Founded: 1993
- Purpose: Capacity Development, Scientific Research, Communication, Partnerships
- Location: Zanzibar
- Region served: Western Indian Ocean (WIO) region (consisting of 10 countries: Somalia, Kenya, Tanzania, Mozambique, South Africa, Comoros, Madagascar, Seychelles, Mauritius, Réunion (France))
- Website: www.wiomsa.org

Western Indian Ocean Marine Science Association (WIOMSA) is a regional professional, non-governmental, non-profit, membership organization, registered in Zanzibar, Tanzania. The organization is dedicated to promoting the educational, scientific and technological development of all aspects of marine sciences throughout the region of Western Indian Ocean (Somalia, Kenya, Tanzania, Mozambique, South Africa, Comoros, Madagascar, Seychelles, Mauritius, Réunion (France)), with a view toward sustaining the use and conservation of its marine resources. The association has about 1000 individual members as well as about 50 institutional members from within and outside the region.

The organization's inter-disciplinary memberships consist of marine scientists, coastal practitioners, and institutions involved in the advancement of marine science research and development. The association:

1. provides a forum for communication and exchange of information amongst its members that promotes and fosters inter-institutional linkage within and beyond the region;
2. supports marine research by offering research grants;
3. implements programs to build the capacity of marine scientists and coastal management practitioners;
4. works to promote policy dialogue on key topics by organizing meetings and seminars on the findings and policy implications of science.

WIOMSA WIOMSA | The Western Indian Ocean Marine Science Association | Home promotes marine science research through the award of research grants under the Marine Science for Management (MASMA) and the Marine Research Grant (MARG) programmes. MASMA is a competitive research grant scheme designed to support research activities in the region as well as organisation of training courses/workshop.

== Marine Science in the Western Indian Ocean (WIO) region ==
Marine and coastal management requires scientific and technical information on both natural (physical, chemical, biological, etc.) and social (institutions, knowledge, perceptions, economic and cultural values, etc.) processes to identify and define priority environment issues as well as to define alternative solutions and strategies. It is therefore essential that appropriate environmental information is available for assessment of impacts of existing and planned activities, and that a sound scientific base exists which can accommodate the changing needs of environmental management institutions as well as society at large. However, experience shows that knowledge generated is often not effectively used in management processes.

In the past two decades, the Western Indian Ocean (WIO) region has seen a significant increase in research studies conducted on different aspects of the marine and coastal environment at a local, national or regional level. This has led to the strengthening of the knowledge base within these environments and increased awareness of important marine and coastal issues. Research capacity has also been strengthened in many disciplines.

At both national and regional levels, a number of important initiatives have been put in place in the recent past, seeking to improve both understanding and management of the marine and coastal environment. Governments’ efforts, together with those of donor-supported projects and programmes, have allowed countries in the region to considerably strengthen the management of their marine and environment. The cumulative effect of such initiatives is evidenced, for example, by the fact that all the governments in the WIO region have initiated the implementation of integrated coastal zone management to a greater or lesser extent, as well as the process of formulating policies and legislation focusing on these marine and coastal environments. In many cases governments have established dedicated units for dealing with marine and coastal issues. In addition, a number of marine protected areas have been established in priority areas.

Despite these efforts, the management of the marine and coastal environment in the WIO remains a challenge. While most countries in the WIO region have put in place policy, legal, regulatory and institutional frameworks that are relevant to the protection and management of the marine and coastal environment, most countries have not succeeded in reversing the trend of degradation in coastal and marine ecosystems. This is attributed to, amongst others factors, sometimes inappropriate, ineffective and/or inadequate governance structures. These weaknesses in governance are reflected as policy and legislative inadequacies; limited institutional capacity; inadequate awareness; inadequate financial mechanisms; and poor knowledge management Welcome to Nairobi Convention | Nairobi Convention

Research in the WIO region is undertaken mainly by universities, government-affiliated research institutes, national and regional NGOs, and by scientists from outside of the region. With the exception of the research initiatives undertaken by Government-affiliated research institutes, research by other organizations is not necessarily aligned to the needs of management authorities. The research agenda of Government-affiliated research institutes such as the Kenya Marine and Fisheries Research Institute (KMFRI); Tanzania Fisheries Research Institute (TAFIRI) and IIP of Mozambique should generally be guided by the management objectives of the departments or Ministries to which they are affiliated.

The strategic objective and priorities of WIOMSA are:

1. Fostering research excellence through facilitating the development and updating of a regional a research agenda, supporting improvements in research quality, and supporting the development of a critical mass of excellent scientists in all relevant disciplines;
2. Developing expertise for effective management and sustainable development;
3. Raising public awareness and enhancing access to relevant knowledge and information;
4. Promoting networking, cooperation and exchange of knowledge between researchers, managers and local communities; and
5. Promoting and advocating appropriate policies and practices.

Based on these priorities, WIOMSA work initially emphasised three programme areas i.e. scientific research, capacity building and communication & extension; with more focus recently on capacity development, information dissemination, partnerships and networking. In this regard, WIOMSA's activities fall within five broad programmatic areas:

- Capacity development

Overall goal of the association's capacity development programme is to develop technical and managerial capacity as well as professionalism, and build the capability of scientists and practitioners to meet the existing and future challenges of coastal and marine management in the WIO region and beyond. WIOMSA and its partners have been at the forefront of initiating innovative and pioneering capacity building programme, which have often been replicated in other regions. The capacity development programme includes short and long-term training courses, development and dissemination of training materials and tools, and the provision of technical support to organizations e.g. recent international training course in mangrove ecosystems (http://inweh.unu.edu/mangrove-wio-region/),. Through its Marine and Coastal Science for Management (MASMA) Programme, WIOMSA has supported experts from the region to pursue MSc and PhD degrees, while the Marine Research Grants (MARG) Program has provided partial support to individuals registered at universities within the region to enable travel for research purposes.

- Scientific research

WIOMSA uses two competitive grant programmes, MASMA and the MARG as mechanisms to address priority issues, improving research quality and developing research capacity in all relevant disciplines. MASMA is designed to support regional research activities as well as organisation of training courses/workshop and publication of books/manuals.

There are two competitive research grants under the MASMA Programme, the ‘Open’ Competitive research grant programme which covers any topic within the priority themes as suggested by applicants, and the ‘Commissioned’ Competitive research grant programme which covers specific topics that emerge as critical during the course of the Programme. Ideas for ‘Commissioned’ grants come from the Programme Committee.

MARG aims at providing young and upcoming scientists with a reliable and flexible mechanism to turn their ideas into research projects and also offers opportunity for presentation of research results at various regional and international fora. There are three types of MARG grants, MARG I (research), MARG II (travel to laboratories outside your country for data analysis) and MARG III (travel grant to attend conferences).

- Information dissemination and communication

Information dissemination and communication are core activities of WIOMSA and are integrated into all objectives of the association. WIOMSA's approaches to information dissemination and communication include publicationPublications | Western Indian Ocean Marine Science Association of books/manuals, policy briefs Policy Briefs, regional Journal/peer-reviewed papers , newsletters, magazines WIOMSA Magazine, flyers and brochures and production of CD-ROMS, DVDs, and TV programmes designed to serve the needs of a wide range of audiences. The WIOMSA website and blog provide news and announcements, while events such as the biennial WIOMSA Scientific Symposium serve as major hubs for exchange and dissemination of information.

- Partnerships/networking

WIOMSA promotes partnerships/networks through a number of approaches such as linking multiple scientific domains e.g. connecting social and natural sciences through the competitive grant programme; institutional partnerships beyond the academic sphere where a number of science to policy initiatives have been facilitated e.g. through WIO-C, a network of implementing agencies active in marine conservation, Nairobi Convention (Nairobi Convention UNEP/Nairobi Convention Secretariat and WIOMSA, 2009); and linkages across geographic boundaries e.g. WIO-COMPAS Programme with the Coastal Resource Center of the University of Rhode Island (http://wiomsa.net/wiocompas/) and Memoranda of Understanding with different organizations e.g. Odinafrica.

WIOMSA provides opportunities through its activities for networking amongst researchers and between researchers and other stakeholders in the region. Most of WIOMSA's activities are carried out in partnership with national institutions and regional and international organizations e.g. The Nairobi Convention Nairobi Convention

=== MASMA projects ===
The Marine and Coastal Science for Management (MASMA) programme is the regions’ first competitive research grant mechanism and was established in 2000 to provide funding and technical support for coastal and marine research, capacity development, and communication of research results in the WIO region. The MASMA programme aims to contribute to the knowledge base on the coastal and marine environments of the region, to raise awareness on important issues, to conduct and coordinate research activities of national and regional importance, as well as to disseminate information and data in support of the sustainable use of coastal and marine resources. The MASMA programme is also seen as an effective means to bolster and maintain regional research capacity in key research areas central to sustainable coastal resource management in the WIO region.

MASMA encourages and supports multi/trans-disciplinary research efforts and promotes regional collaboration in research amongst experts from the different countries in the region and partnerships between scientists from within and outside the region. It also aims at building professionalism and competence amongst regional researchers in designing and coordinating regional research projects.

MASMA provides an exceptional foundation for addressing the pressing environmental issues of the region in a collaborative and structured manner. As a regional programme, MASMA provides a number of benefits:

With limited personnel capacity and financial resources to sponsor research at the national level, MASMA as a regional programme provides an opportunity for countries in the region to access funds and human capacity that they would not have been able to mobilize in normal circumstances.

The MASMA programme contributes towards facilitating access for regional experts to international research and networks leading to the internationalization of their institutions and research work.

Between 2000 and 2011 WIOMSA financed at least forty regional projects, which have contributed to the increased knowledge base on the coastal and marine environments of the region and raised awareness on important management issues. However, outputs and outcomes of these projects are not well known outside project teams as there has been no strategy both at the project and WIOMSA level to use these projects as flagships for the purpose of raising their visibility as well as that of WIOMSA.

In the current phase, six projects have been approved so far covering topics ranging from adaptation to climate change at local government and community level; integration of science into MPA management; and linking marine science, traditional knowledge and cultural perceptions to develop future marine management frameworks using spatial simulation tools and educational games; identification and effective integrated management of dugongs and their habitats; use of the adaptive management approach to build the capacity of communities to implement fisheries management interventions; and assessment of the scale and impacts of bycatch in fisheries across the region.

These projects are not only multi-disciplinary with involvement of social and natural scientists working at different levels from the community to regional levels, but are implemented in all countries of the WIO except Somalia, and involve management authorities, research institutions, non-governmental organizations and the private sector. Further, all these projects have developed coherent communication and dissemination plans outlining how their outputs and results will be communicated to the potential end users including the general public, policy makers and the scientific community.

== Notable members ==
- Adelaida K. Semesi (1951-2001), mangrove ecologist and former trustee
