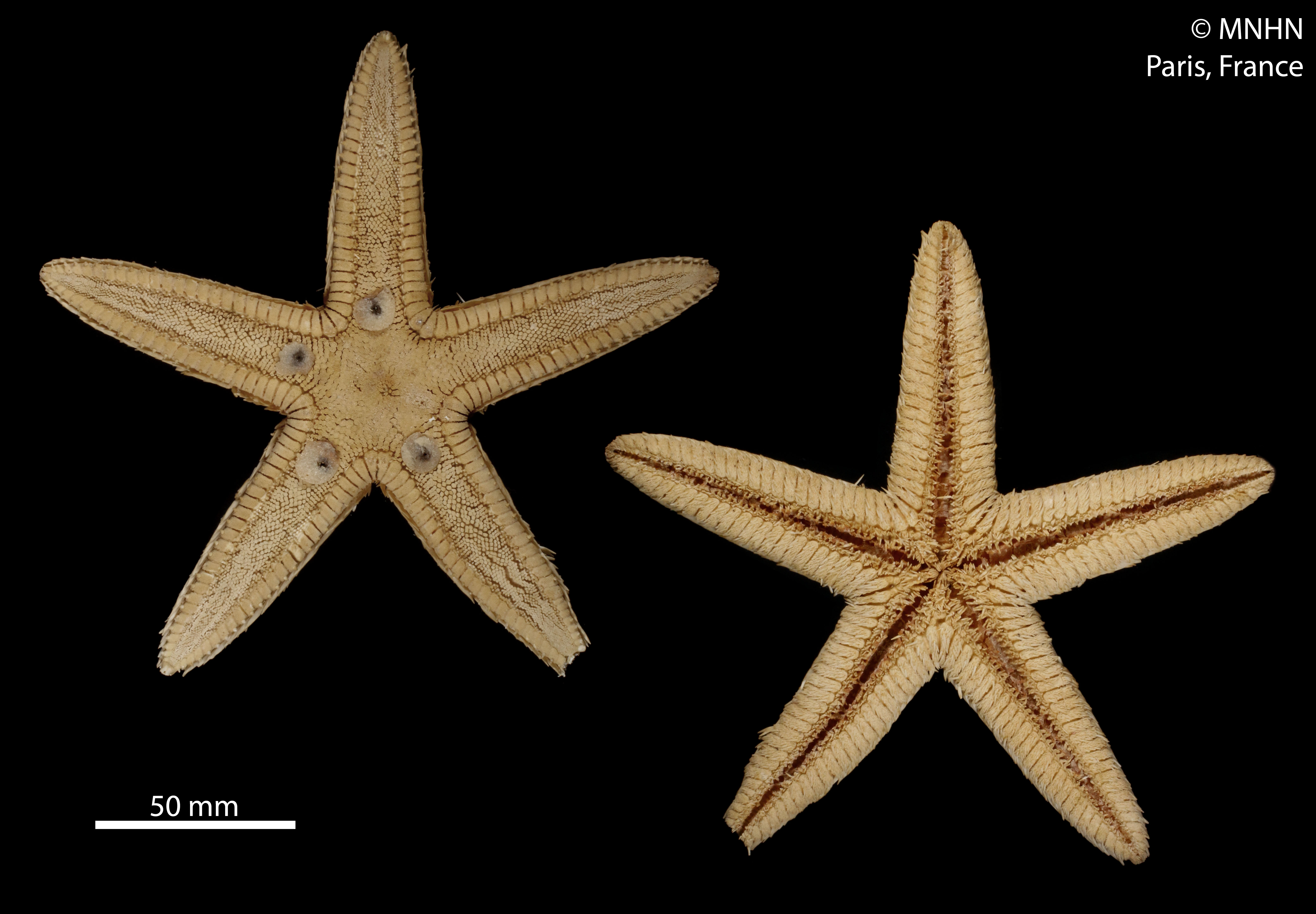

Scientific classification
- Kingdom: Animalia
- Phylum: Echinodermata
- Class: Asteroidea
- Order: Paxillosida
- Family: Astropectinidae
- Genus: Astropecten
- Species: A. scoparius

Binomial name
- Astropecten scoparius Müller & Troschel, 1842

Synonyms
- Astropecten japonicus Müller & Troschel, 1842

= Astropecten scoparius =

Species of starfish

Astropecten scoparius is a sea star in the family Astropectinidae. It is found in shallow water in the East China Sea and around the coasts of Japan. It is a grey starfish and each of its five arms has a narrow pale margin. It burrows in the muddy sediments on the seabed and feeds on molluscs.

== Distribution ==
Astropecten scoparius occurs in the East China Sea and around the islands of Hokkaido, Honshu and Kyushu.

== Biology ==
Astropecten scoparius is a predator and is found on the seabed in shallow water or buried in soft sediments. In Ise Bay in central Japan, it lives near the mouth of the bay, while another starfish, Luidia quinaria, predominates in other parts of the bay. Astropecten scoparius feeds largely on molluscs such as the clam Alvenius ojianus and the small gastropod Voorwindia paludinoides while Luidia quinaria is adept at catching brittle stars (Ophiura kinbergi) and other echinoderms.

Astropecten scoparius mostly breeds between June and August. Both females and males liberate gametes into the sea where fertilisation takes place. The bipinnaria larvae that hatch from the eggs are planktonic. They are bilaterally symmetrical and have a pair of body processes, a gut and two bands of cilia which are used for swimming. They feed and grow but do not pass through a brachiolaria stage as do most starfish larvae. After about eighteen days they settle on the seabed where they undergo metamorphosis. At this stage they become radially symmetrical, each one having a single central plate, a madreporite plate, five radial and five interradial plates, and five terminal plates which are the first stage in the development of the arms. A central mouth also develops on the oral (under) surface and the juvenile starts to feed.

== Toxicity ==
In some circumstances, Astropecten scoparius contains the neurotoxin tetrodotoxin, also known as TTX. This starfish accumulates lesser quantities of the toxin than does its close relative Astropecten polyacanthus. Both have been associated with cases of paralytic shellfish poisoning of humans in Japan caused by consumption of the trumpet shell Charonia lampas. It is believed that the toxin is passed through the food chain, the trumpet shell having acquired it through feeding on the starfish. The starfish may themselves have incorporated TTX into their tissues through feeding on certain tiny gastropod molluscs Umborium suturale.
