= Astropecten latespinosus =

Scientific classification
- Kingdom: Animalia
- Phylum: Echinodermata
- Class: Asteroidea
- Order: Paxillosida
- Family: Astropectinidae
- Genus: Astropecten
- Species: A. latespinosus

Binomial name
- Astropecten latespinosus Meissner, 1892

Species of starfish

Astropecten latespinosus is a species of starfish in the family Astropectinidae. It is one of the commonest starfish in the seas around Japan. The name in Japanese is hira momiji, "hira" meaning flattened and "momiji" meaning maple leaves tinged with bright red, a name given to certain starfish which resemble maple leaves in form.

== Description ==
Astropecten latespinosus is a five-armed starfish with a brownish flattened body and a fringe of pale-coloured spines round the margins of the short, tapered arms.

== Biology ==
Unlike many members of this genus, the larva of Astropecten latespinosus is not a brachiolaria larva but is barrel-shaped and undergoes metamorphosis at a very early stage of development.
