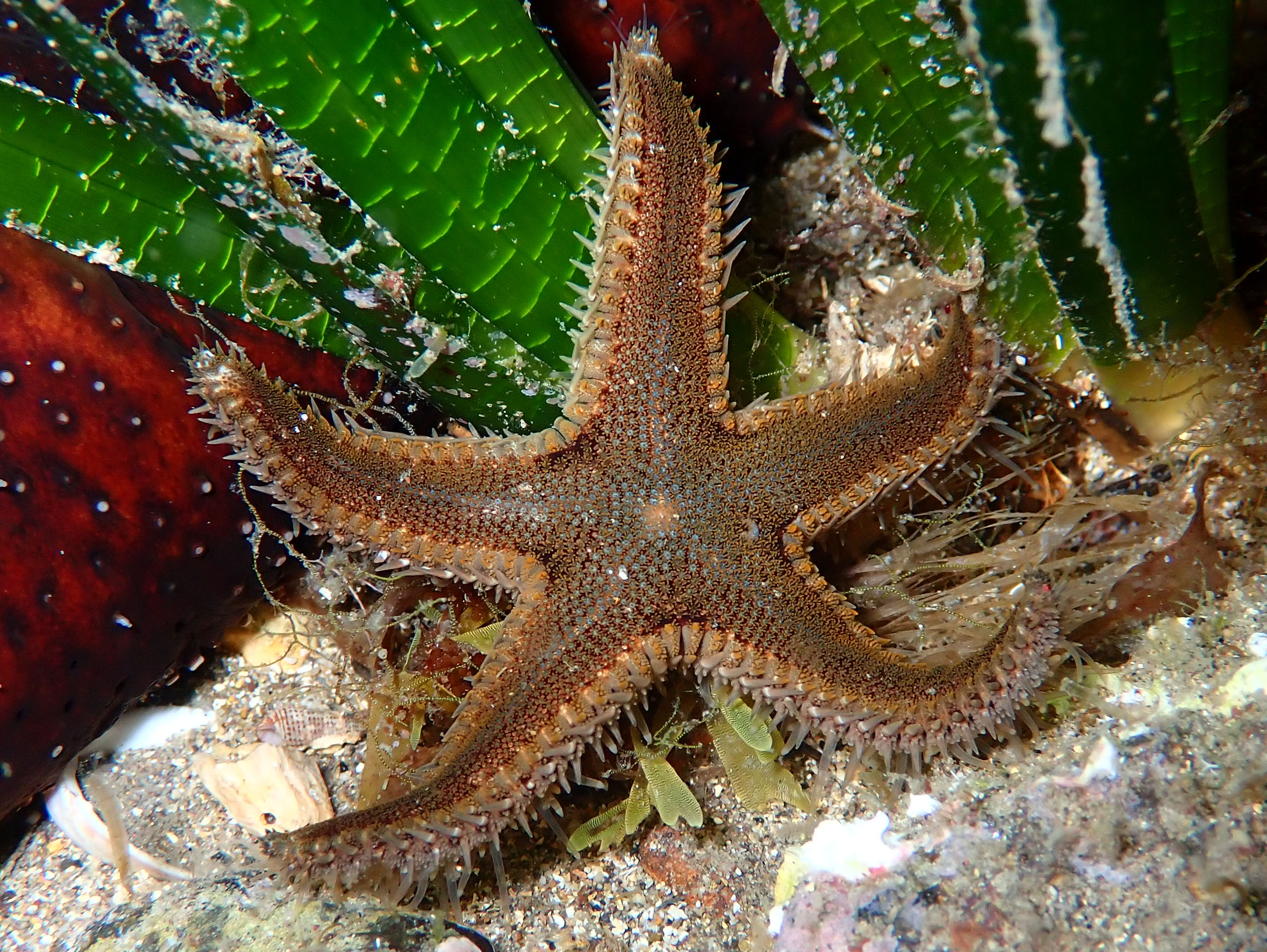

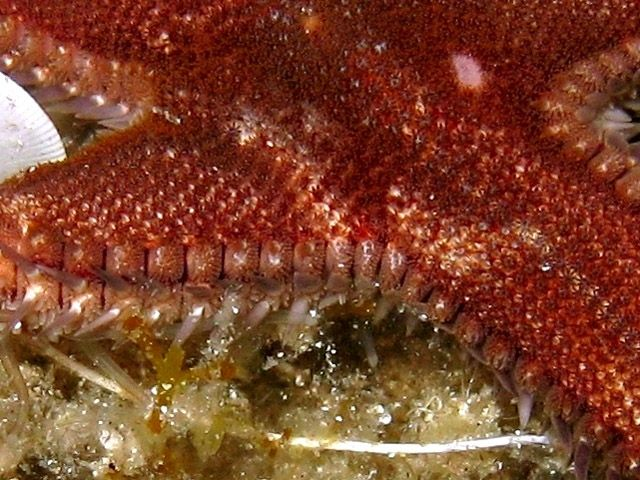
- Astropecten spinulosus on sea bottom

Scientific classification
- Kingdom: Animalia
- Phylum: Echinodermata
- Class: Asteroidea
- Order: Paxillosida
- Family: Astropectinidae
- Genus: Astropecten
- Species: A. spinulosus

Binomial name
- Astropecten spinulosus (Philippi, 1837)

= Astropecten spinulosus =

Species of starfish

Astropecten spinulosus is a sea star of the family Astropectinidae.

== Habitat and behaviour ==
Starfishes of the genus Astropecten live on mobile seabed (sandy, muddy or gravel seabed) and they remain largely buried under sediment during the day. During the late afternoon and the night starfishes go out to hunt mainly bivalve molluscs, which are their favourite prey. This species lives only in the Mediterranean Sea and it prefers sandy seabed near meadows Posidonia oceanica or Cymodocea nodosa or other mobile seabed in areas very rich in algae from 1 to 50 m deep. This species is active and easy to find during the night, sometimes it is possible to find it in the late afternoon.

== Description ==
It has very short superomarginal plates (the height of the vertical face is slightly larger than the width of plate), completely covered by scales and very small spines. Only from 1 to 3 small spines on the top of plate can be considered a real spines (the other spines are too small). The colour of these spines is the same of the superomarginal plates and it is brown or clear brown. The inferomarginal spines are long and pointed and they have the feature colour blue-purple. It looks like a slender starfish and sometimes it has rounded ends of the arms. The aboral side has always dark colour: brown, reddish-brown, rarely greenish. It is the only Astropecten that often moves away from mobile seabed and it is possible to meet them on hard bottoms, in cave or climbing on Posidonia oceanica. It is a small starfish, usually 6–8 cm and maximum just under 10 cm in diameter. This sea star can be distinguished from very short superomarginal plates, the colour of aboral side, the colour of inferomarginal spines and size. This species can sometimes be confused with Astropecten platyacanthus.

== Feeding ==
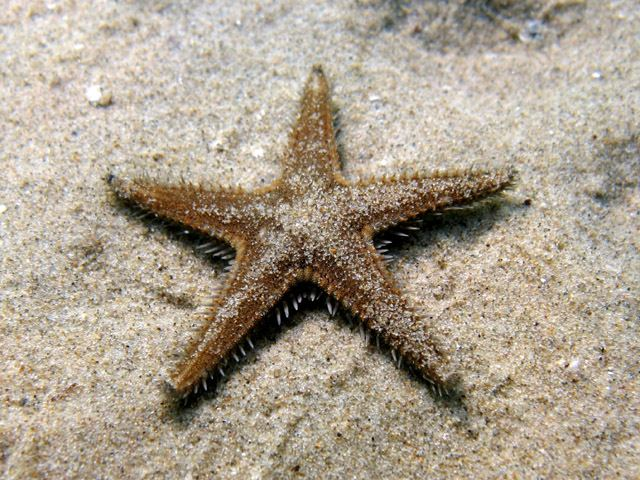

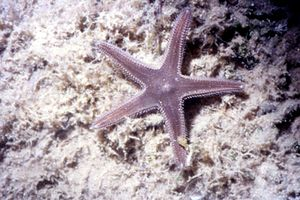

This sea star is a carnivore and feeds on molluscs, which it catches with its arms and then takes to the mouth. The prey is then trapped by the long, moving prickles around the mouth cavity.
