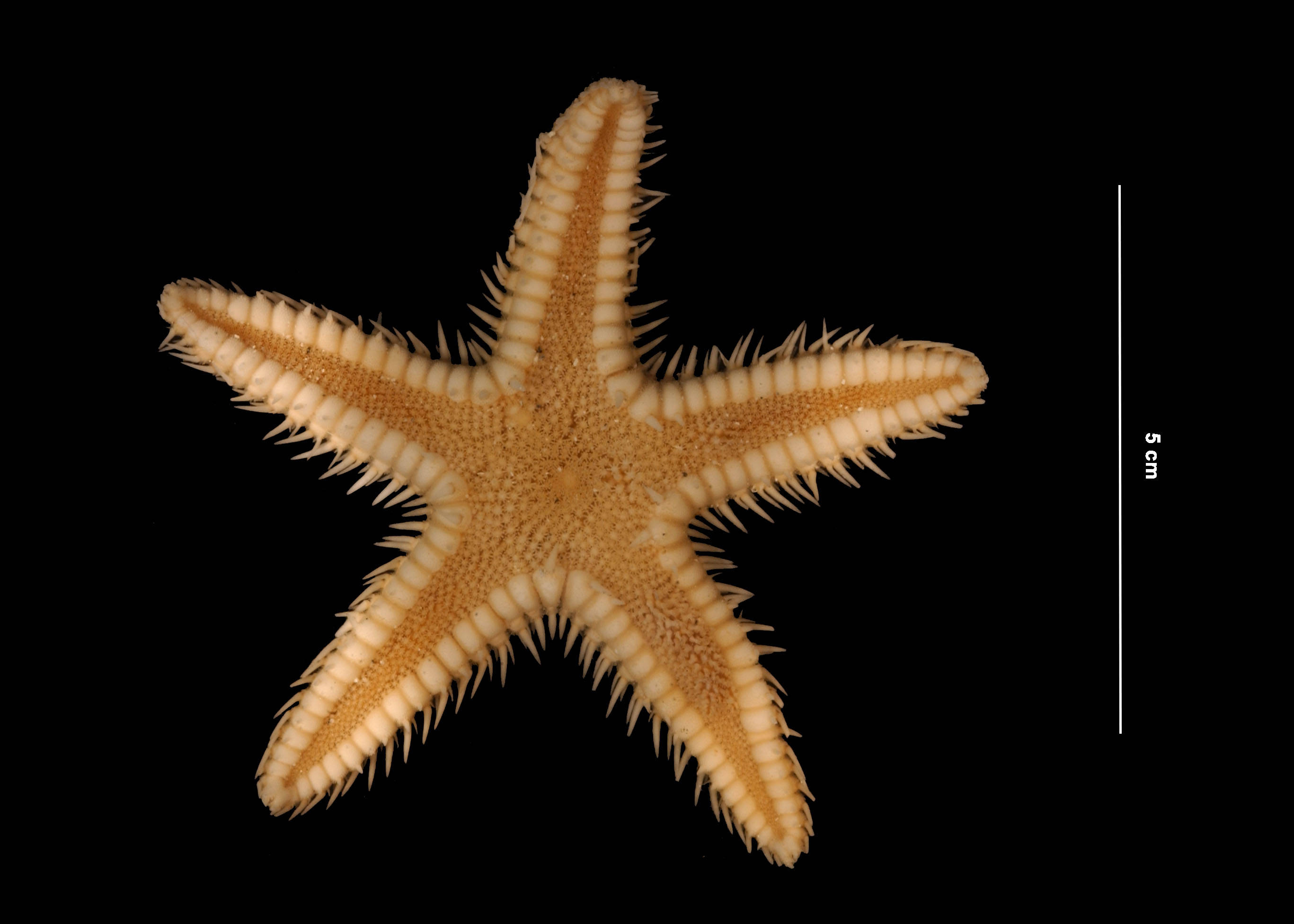

Scientific classification
- Kingdom: Animalia
- Phylum: Echinodermata
- Class: Asteroidea
- Order: Paxillosida
- Family: Astropectinidae
- Genus: Astropecten
- Species: A. duplicatus

Binomial name
- Astropecten duplicatus Gray, 1840

Synonyms
- Astropecten antillensis H.L. Clark, 1898; Astropecten articulatus duplicatus Döderlein, 1917; Astropecten valencienni Müller & Troschel, 1842; Astropecten variabilis Lutken, 1859

= Astropecten duplicatus =

Species of starfish

Astropecten duplicatus, the two-spined sea star, is a starfish in the family Astropectinidae. It is found in the eastern Atlantic Ocean, the Caribbean Sea and the Gulf of Mexico.

== Description ==
Astropecten duplicatus normally has five long slender, tapering arms which are flattened dorso-ventrally. The aboral (upper) surface has a single row of large marginal plates around the edges of the arms. These are granular, and the two that are closest to the disc each bear a conical spine, although this is often worn away. Other marginal plates and the plates on the oral (lower) surface bear many fine blunt spinules. The tube feet are pointed and have no suckers. Astropecten duplicatus grows to about 20 cm (8 in) in diameter. The aboral surface is pale grey or reddish-brown and the oral surface is pale brown or orange.

== Distribution and habitat ==
Astropecten duplicatus is native to the eastern Atlantic Ocean, the Caribbean Sea and the Gulf of Mexico. Its range extends from Cape Hatteras, Florida, Cuba and the Bahamas to Mexico, Colombia, Venezuela and Guyana. It is found on sand or other soft sediments and in seagrass meadows at depths down to about 500 metres (1,600 ft). The type material, collected from St Vincent and the Grenadines by Lansdown Guilding in the early 19th century, is currently held in the Natural History Museum, London.

== Biology ==
Astropecten duplicatus spends the day semi-immersed in the sediment on the seabed. It is a carnivore and at night it hunts for bivalve molluscs and gastropods. It transfers its prey to its mouth with its arms, and swallows it whole, later regurgitating any undigested fragments.
