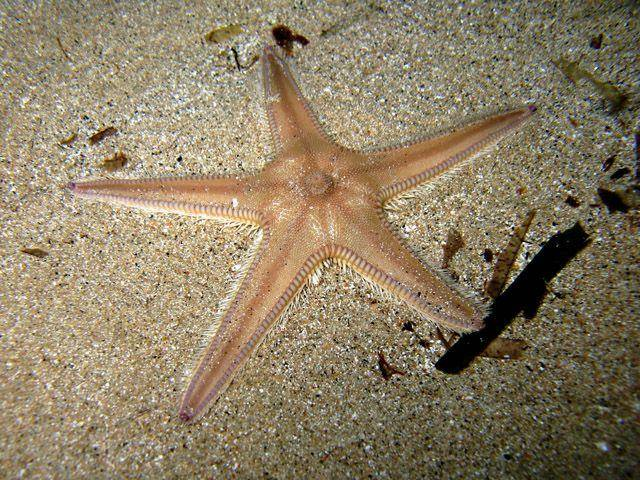

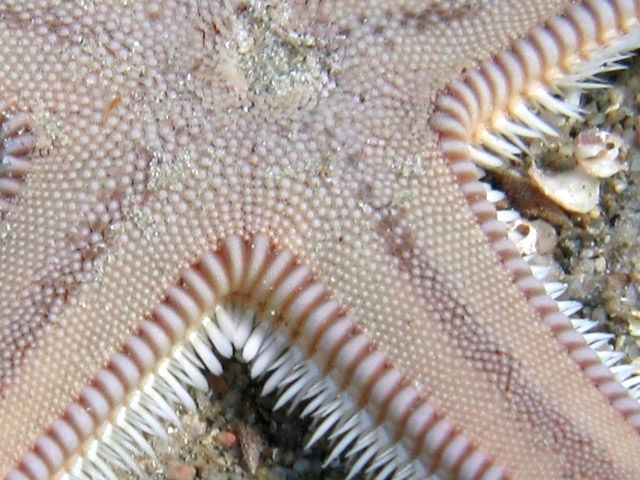
- Astropecten irregularis on sea bottom

Scientific classification
- Kingdom: Animalia
- Phylum: Echinodermata
- Class: Asteroidea
- Order: Paxillosida
- Family: Astropectinidae
- Genus: Astropecten
- Species: A. irregularis

Binomial name
- Astropecten irregularis (Pennant, 1777)

= Astropecten irregularis =

Species of starfish

Astropecten irregularis is a sea star of the family Astropectinidae. Common names include Sand sea star (A. i. pontoporeus).

== Habitat and behaviour ==
Starfishes of genus Astropecten live on mobile seabed (sandy, muddy or gravel seabed), and they remain largely buried under sediment during the day. During the late afternoon and the night, starfish go out to hunt mainly bivalve molluscs, which are their favourite prey. Astropecten irregularis is a very common species in all kind of mobile seabed from 1 to about 1,000 m deep. This species is active and easy to find during the night, and sometimes it is possible to find them in the late afternoon.

== Description ==
This species lives in the Atlantic Ocean and in the Mediterranean, but the two populations show differences in superomarginal plates. In particular, the specimens of the Mediterranean have superomarginal plates devoid of spines (they are considered by some author as the subspecies Astropecten irregularis pentacanthus) while Atlantic populations are provided with one spine for each superomarginal plates (they are considered by some authors as the subspecies Astropecten irregularis irregularis) or more spines (they are considered by some authors as the subspecies Astropecten irregularis serratus and by some others as a variety of Astropecten irregularis irregularis). This starfish has a well-developed and raised superomarginal plates and the specimens in the Mediterranean are totally devoid of spines. The inferomarginal plates are short, thin, fine-spines, highly mobile and white colour. Astropecten irregularis doesn’t keep these spines rigid and parallel to each other as the other species do. The arms make up among them, at their base where they join the disc, a very clean corner. The colour of aboral side is pink homogeneous, often violet in towards the end of the arms and sometimes there are many small darker spots in the central disc. Sometimes it has a bulge on centre of the disc that is highly developed in this species. This bulge protrudes from the sediment where the animal is hidden and it has respiratory functions (called "aboral-cone”). Usually it has diameter of about 10–12 cm with a maximum of 19 cm. It's a very common species in all kind of mobile seabed from 1 to about 1,000 m deep. Usually this starfish can be distinguished easily and safely from the others species of Mediterranean for superomarginal plates devoid of spines and from colour. Sometimes it is confused with Astropecten aranciacus for the similar colour, but it’s always possible to distinguish the two species by a closer inspection of superomarginal plates and inferomarginal spines or by observations of the colour of the paxillae.

== Feeding ==
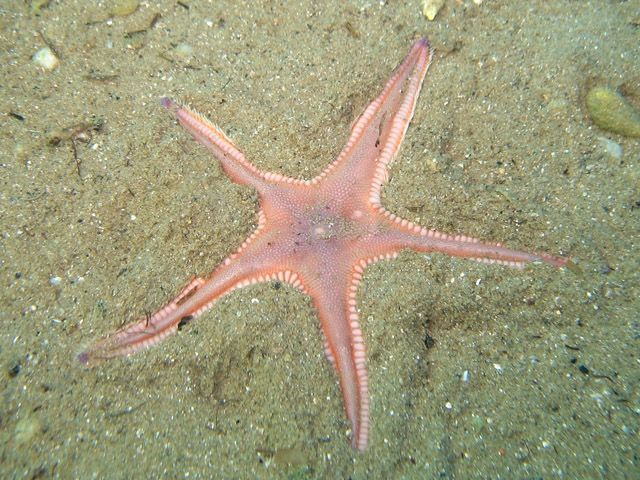
Astropecten irregularis pentacanthus

This sea star is a carnivore and feeds on molluscs, which it catches with its arms and then takes to the mouth. The prey is then trapped by the long, moving prickles around the mouth cavity.

== Synonymised taxa ==
- Asterias aranciaca O.F. Mueller, 1776 (Synonym according to Sladen (1889))
- Astropecten acicularis Norman, 1865 (synonym according to Sladen (1889))
- Astropecten aurantiaca Forbes, 1841 (synonym according to Perrier (1875))
- Astropecten hispidus Müller & Troschel, 1842 (synonym according to Doderlein (1917))
- Astropecten muelleri Müller & Troschel, 1844 (synonym)
- Astropecten muelleri Düben, 1845 (Synonym according to Doderlein (1917))
- Astropecten pontoporeus Sladen, 1883 (Subspecies according to Doderlein (1917))

== Subspecies ==
- Astropecten irregularis irregularis (Pennant, 1777)
- Astropecten irregularis pentacanthus (Delle Chiaje, 1827)
- Astropecten irregularis pontoporeus Sladen, 1883
- Astropecten irregularis serratus (Müller & Troschel, 1842)
