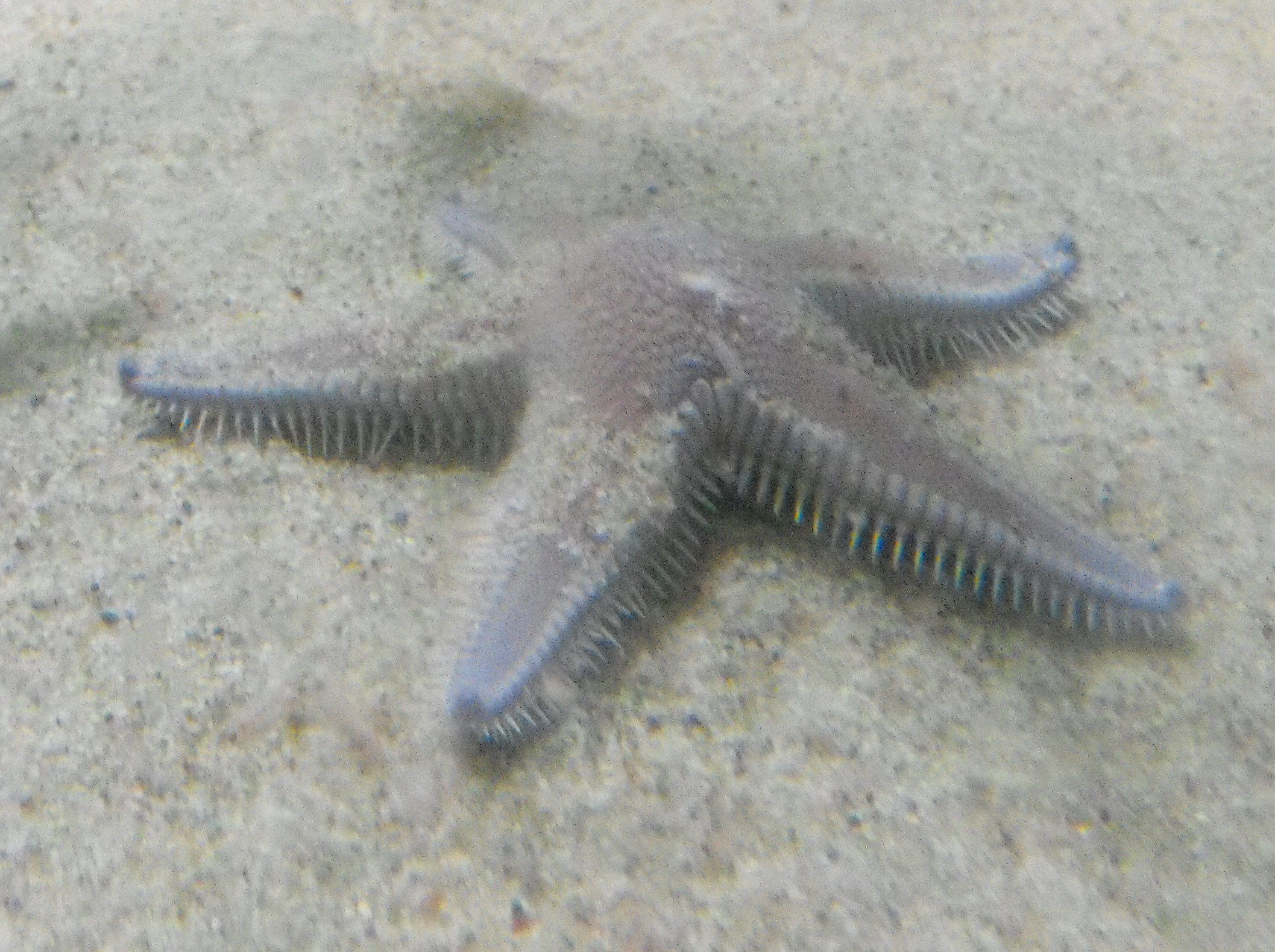

Scientific classification
- Kingdom: Animalia
- Phylum: Echinodermata
- Class: Asteroidea
- Order: Paxillosida
- Family: Astropectinidae
- Genus: Astropecten
- Species: A. armatus

Binomial name
- Astropecten armatus Gray, 1840

= Astropecten armatus =

Species of starfish

Astropecten armatus, the spiny sand star or Estrella de Arena, is a sea star in the family Astropectinidae. It is found on sandy or gravelly areas in the East Pacific ranging from California (USA) to Ecuador.

== Description ==
Astropecten armatus is a dorsally flattened starfish, which grows to a diameter of about 17 cm (7 in). The disc is quite small and the five arms are slender and pointed, slightly turned up at the tips. The madreporite is very close to the edge of the disc. The central surface of both disc and arms is smooth. The arms have conspicuous marginal plates with a fringe of upward pointing spines and another of downward pointing ones. Further rows of spines line the ambulacral grooves. The tube feet are pointed and do not have suckers. The colour of the aboral (upper) surface is yellowish brown, dull pink or grey and the starfish blends in well with the colour of the substrate. The oral (under) surface is pale yellow or ivory.

== Distribution and habitat ==
Astropecten armatus is found in the eastern Pacific Ocean on sandy or soft gravel seabeds, often semi-submerged in the sediment. Its range extends from San Pedro Bay in California (USA) to Ecuador. Off the western coast of Mexico, it is the most abundant starfish on suitable substrates, at all depths between 5 and 115 metres (16 and 377 ft). The type material, collected by Hugh Cuming around 1829 from Puerto Portrero in Costa Rica is currently held in the Natural History Museum, London.

== Biology ==
Astropecten armatus is an agile starfish. It can "glide" across the surface of the sand with its mobile tube feet. If turned upside down it can right itself with a flip and if several are stacked on top of each other, they will quickly disperse. It is a predator and primarily feeds on the olive snail (Olivella biplicata). It can consume these at the rate of one each day but, when they are less plentiful, it will turn to other food sources and eat sand dollars and sea pansies and scavenge on dead fish.
