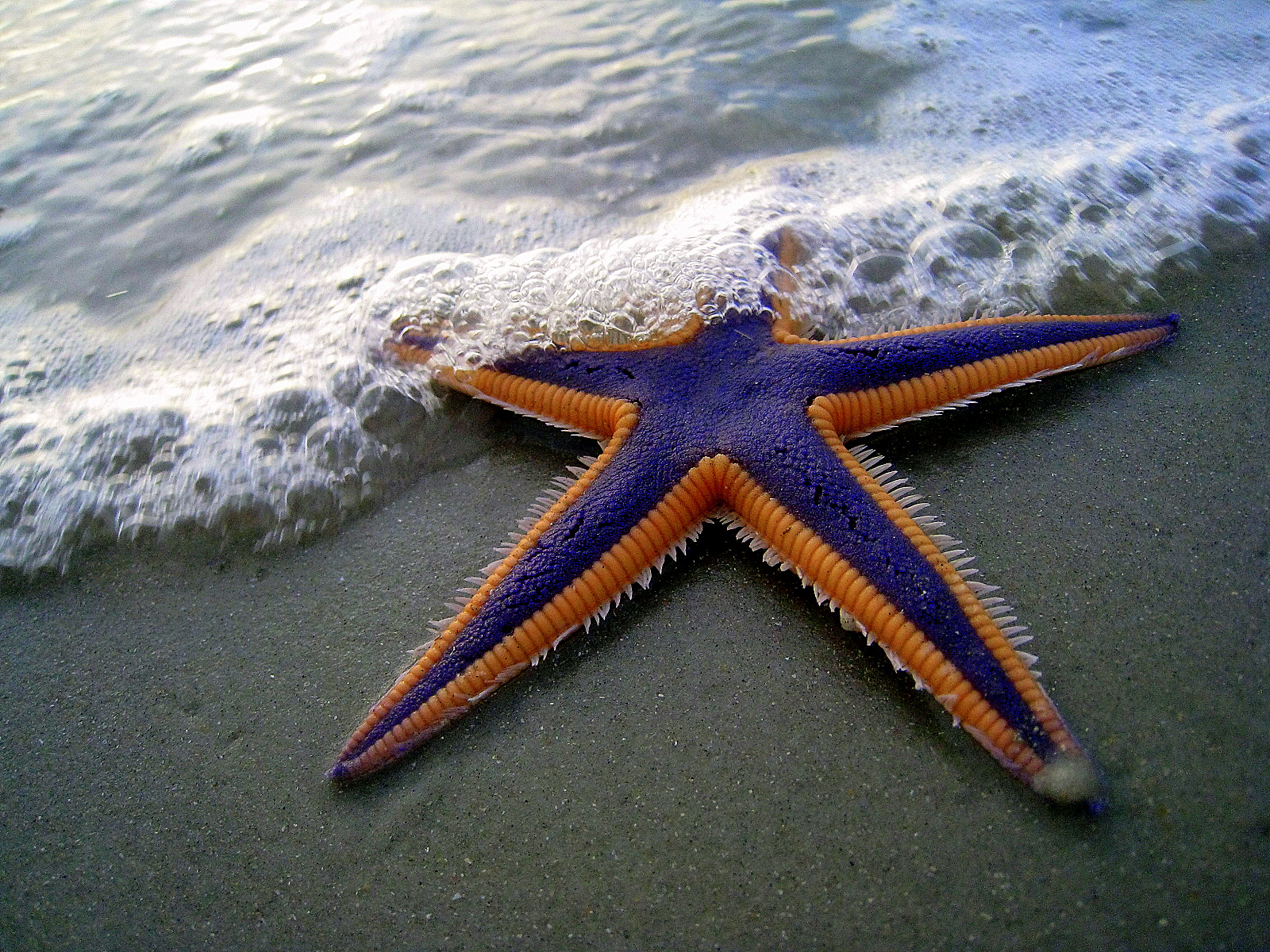
- Astropecten articulatus on the beach

Scientific classification
- Kingdom: Animalia
- Phylum: Echinodermata
- Class: Asteroidea
- Order: Paxillosida
- Family: Astropectinidae
- Genus: Astropecten
- Species: A. articulatus

Binomial name
- Astropecten articulatus (Say, 1825)

Synonyms
- Asterias aranciaca Gould, 1841; Asterias articulata Say, 1825; Astropecten buschi Müller & Troschel, 1843; Astropecten dubius Gray, 1840; Astropecten duplicatus Koehler, 1909

= Astropecten articulatus =

Species of starfish

The Astropecten articulatus, more commonly known as the royal starfish, is a West Atlantic sea star of the family Astropectinidae.

== Description ==
The Royal Starfish is characterized by its bold colors. It has a purple granulated disk, which is the central region of the sea star, and the purple color continues to extend to its five arms. The margin of the sea star, which is its outline, is an orange color. Entomologist Thomas Say describes the sea star's margin as “articulated throughout”, meaning that the orange margin that surrounds the sea star is continuous, even at the joints of its rays. It also has white spines that are attached to the orange margin and tube feet at the ends of its rays.

The tube feet are cylindrical with conical ends, and the epithelium of the tube foot is covered by a thin layer of cuticle. Underneath the epithelium is the nervous tissue, and underneath that are fibrous tissues in the form of both left and right helices which protect the sea star's muscle tissue layer. The tube feet also contain bilobed ampulla. The ampulla muscle layers in the tube feet allow for the tube feet to elongate and shorten, which allows the sea star to move.

Morphologically, the Royal Starfish is very similar to the Red Comb Starfish. In the past, it was thought that a difference between the two species was that the Red Comb Starfish has needle-like granules in its disk while the royal Starfish has spherical ones. However, a newer study has found that the granules are not spherical, and may have the appearance of that shape due to folding

The sea star can be found on the east coast of the continental Americas, particularly in the Caribbean.

== Feeding and Foraging ==
The Royal Starfish feeds by swallowing its food whole and digesting it in its stomach, like other members of the genus Astropecten. However, unlike other species in the same genus, it consumes significantly more organisms. In a study investigating the stomach contents of 124 Royal Starfishes, scientists found that on average, each sea star has 12 organisms in its stomach, with the highest number of organisms recorded being 54. When comparing the number of organisms in the Royal Starfishes' stomachs to another study investigating the stomach contents of the Red Comb Starfish, it is revealed that the Royal Starfishes have much higher amounts. Also, one study investigating A. irregularis shows the same outcome, that there are more organisms in the stomachs of Royal Starfishes than A. irregularis, but in another study, the stomachs of both sea star species are relatively the same.

Royal Starfishes also feed on a diverse number of organisms. From the previous study, in all of the 124 sea stars combined, there were a total of 91 species of organisms found in their stomachs. The three most abundant species were A. candy, N. pusila, and O. music, which were gastropods, and accounted for 60% of all species that Royal Starfishes feed on. The study also found that the sea star consumes the mollusk shell regardless of whether or not the original organism is still inside. The fact that the scientists found parts of Royal Starfishes in their stomachs means that they can be considered cannibals, which is also the case for their relative A. irregularis.

An investigation of three digestive enzymes in the stomachs of Royal Starfishes gives more information about its feeding. The study measured enzyme activity of the enzymes chymotrypsin, -glucosidase, and -glucosidase on subtropical and polar echinoderms. Regarding Royal Starfishes, the study showed that it had very low levels of -glucosidase, but high levels of -glucosidase, and average levels of chymotrypsin. Since -glucosidase involves the degradation of detritus, it is bizarre that the sea star has relatively low levels of it because it contradicts the findings of Wells’ study: that the sea star consumes the shell of any mollusk regardless of whether or not there is an organism inside. Also, the high levels of -glucosidase indicate that the sea star also consumes high levels of plants, since that enzyme involves the degradation of plants. Lastly, even though Wells’ study found that the sea star consumes more organisms than other species of the same genus and is highly carnivorous, it is surprising that it does not have as high chymotrypsin levels as others. Chymotrypsin is involved in the degradation of proteins, so an organism that consumes more protein should have higher levels, but that is not the case with Royal Starfishes.

When investigating the foraging patterns of Royal Starfishes, a Royal Starfish was given two choices of equal amounts of organisms to consume: either low-quality or high-quality. The Royal Starfish chose to consume the higher quality organism more often than the low-quality one. In the same study, it was also given a choice of small-sized prey and larger-sized prey. The Royal Starfish chose to consume the smaller-sized prey more often, and this is because smaller prey decreases handling time. This means that the sea star prefers to consume the organism that would provide it with the most net energy gain for the shortest time, and therefore forages optimally.

The scientists also found that Royal Starfishes exhibit directional movement when prey are not present in their surroundings. However, when prey is present, they start to exhibit more change in movement and speed. This means that when prey is present, they alter their movement patterns so that they forage in areas with “higher prey density”, which is more evidence of the sea star foraging optimally. Lastly, the study found that the sea star forages twice a day, at dawn and dusk, which is similar to other species in the Astropecten genus.

Overall, the feeding patterns of Royal Starfishes can be summarized as foraging optimally on mollusks and possibly plants, but also consuming more organisms than the typical starfish species.
