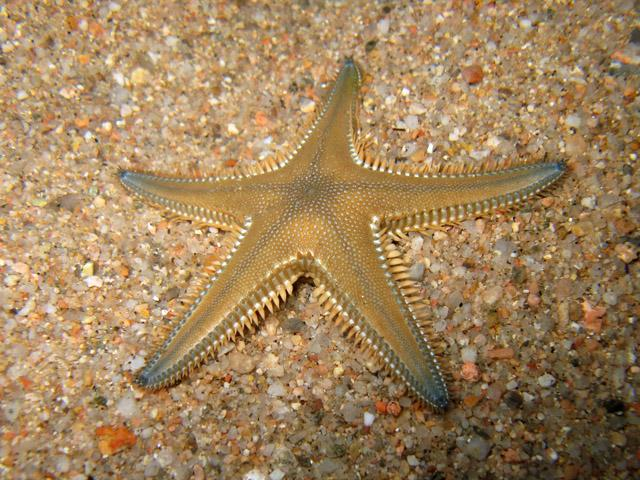

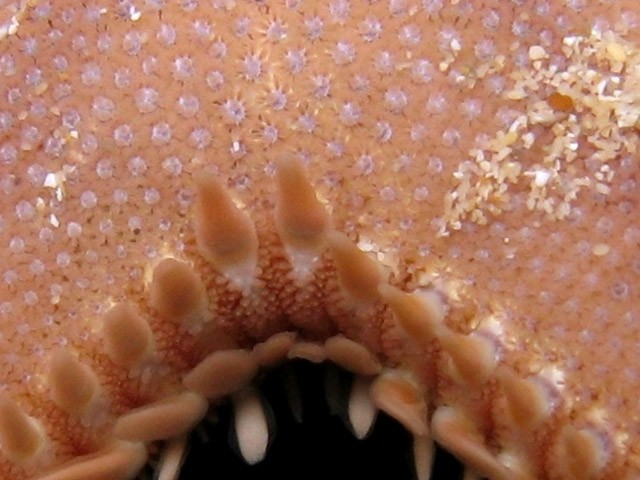
- Astropecten platyacanthus on sea bottom

Scientific classification
- Kingdom: Animalia
- Phylum: Echinodermata
- Class: Asteroidea
- Order: Paxillosida
- Family: Astropectinidae
- Genus: Astropecten
- Species: A. platyacanthus

Binomial name
- Astropecten platyacanthus (Philippi, 1837)

= Astropecten platyacanthus =

Species of starfish

Astropecten platyacanthus is a sea star of the family Astropectinidae.

== Habitat and behaviour ==
Starfishes of genus Astropecten live on mobile seabed (sandy, muddy or gravel seabed) and they remain largely buried under sediment during the day. During the late afternoon and the night starfishes go out to hunt mainly bivalve molluscs, which are their favourite preys. This species lives only in the Mediterranean Sea and it lives on all mobile seabed at depths between 1 and 60 m, but it is more frequently in seabed of mixed coarse sand and mud at 1–4 m depth. This species is active and easy to find during the night but also during the day, especially in early morning and late afternoon.

== Description ==
It has narrow and high superomarginal plates, laterally covered with scales and small spines (on vertical face). Every superomarginal plates is equipped with one strong spine, usually sharp but irregularly shaped, slightly flattened laterally, often yellow or orange but rarely off white. Sometimes, especially in young specimen, only superomarginal plates between the arms are equipped with one strong spine while others are not (in some rare specimens all the superomarginal plates are totally devoid of spines). In populations of certain areas of the Mediterranean (for example, the South of Corsica) this feature is very frequent. The superomarginal spines are (more or less) far from the inside edge of plates and they leave on top, on the base of them, a small bare area that it is white if there is a strong spine in the plate (usually in the plates near the disc) or blue-violet if the plate has very small spine or no spine (usually towards the tip of arms). The maximum number of superomarginal plates, observed on each arm, is 48; normally the number is between 29 and 43, depending on the size of the starfish. The inferomarginal spines are long, flat and quite pointed. It is an Astropecten with very variable features and it can have wide or narrow arms. The aboral side has very variables colours and it can be more or less dark brown, olive green, pink-brown, bluish-grey. The oral side usually is yellow-brown. Normally it reaches a diameter of 9–12 cm and exceptionally it can measure up to 18 cm. It is the Mediterranean Astropecten hardest to identify both for the variability of features of the species, both for the resemblance to some other species.

It is distinguished from Astropecten bispinosus mainly for the superomarginal spines far from the inside edge of plates and they leave on top, on the base of them, a small bare area. Another important feature of Astropecten platyacanthus is that the superomarginal plates are laterally, on vertical face, covered with scales and small spines rather than nude. Moreover, it is different because it has smaller, irregularly shaped, laterally flattened (rather than clean conical spine) superomarginal spines and because it has average less superomarginal plates on each arm. In addition, on average Astropecten platyacanthus has a central disc larger, a darker oral side and a small red point in the point of arms have.

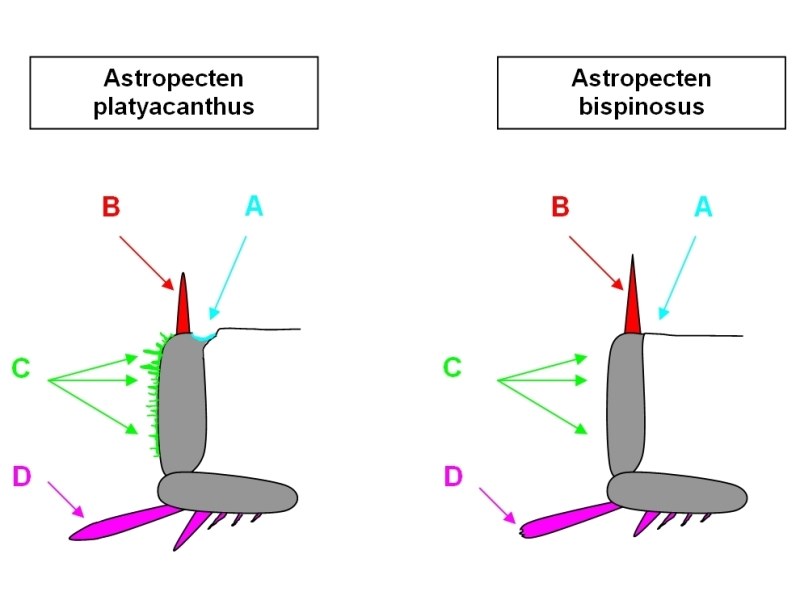
Astropecten bispinosus vs. Astropecten platyacanthus

A = Astropecten platyacanthus is distinguished from Astropecten bispinosus for the superomarginal spines far from the inside edge of plates. They leave on top, on the base of them, a small bare area. B = Astropecten platyacanthus is a bit different from Astropecten bispinosus for the superomarginal spines smaller, irregularly shaped, laterally flattened (rather than clean conical spine). C = Astropecten platyacanthus is distinguished from Astropecten bispinosus for the vertical face of superomarginal plates, that are laterally covered with scales and small spines rather than nude D = Astropecten platyacanthus is a bit different from Astropecten bispinosus for the inferomarginal spines, sometime less pointed.

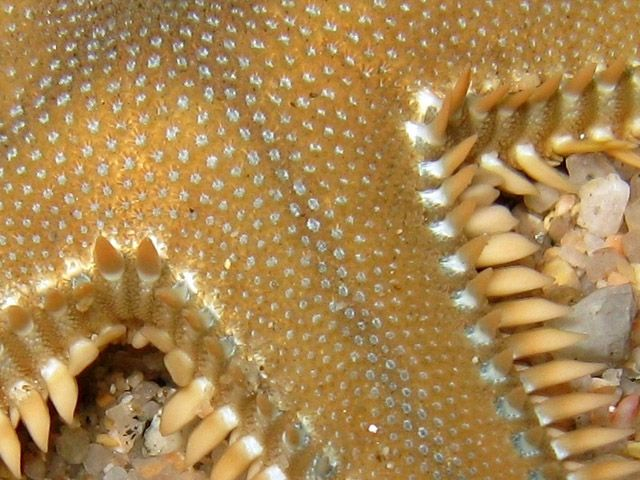
Superomarginal spines of Astropecten platyacanthus far from the inside edge of plates

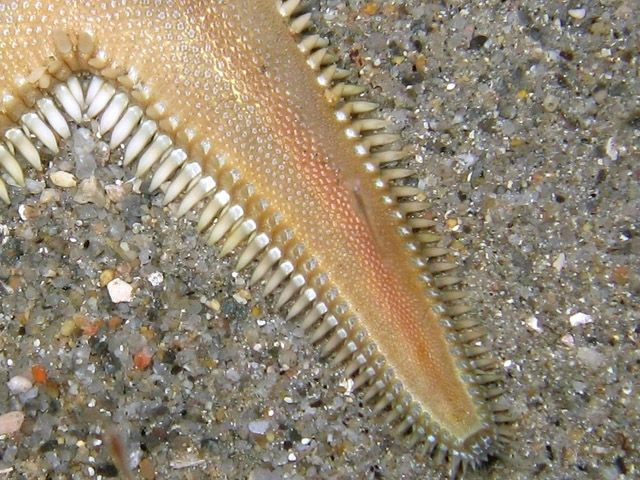
Specimen large 17 cm with 35 superomarginal plates on the arm

It is distinguished from Astropecten spinulosus by very different superomarginal plates: highest, defined and equipped with very big and strong superomarginal spines and they have very different plates. Secondly, the general appearance of the starfish and the colour are usually different: Astropecten spinulosus is always slenderer and dark brown with superomarginal spines brown and inferomarginal spines blue-purple. Astropecten platyacanthus reaches or exceeds 10 cm in diameter, while Astropecten spinulosus reaches at maximum just under 10 cm in diameter.

Young specimens of Astropecten platyacanthus sometimes can be confused with Astropecten jonstoni for the appearance and the colour, but it is always easy to distinguish them by very different superomarginal plates and superomarginal spines.
