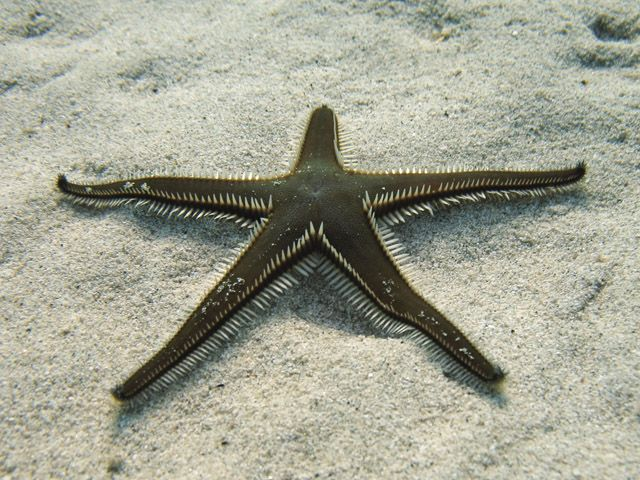

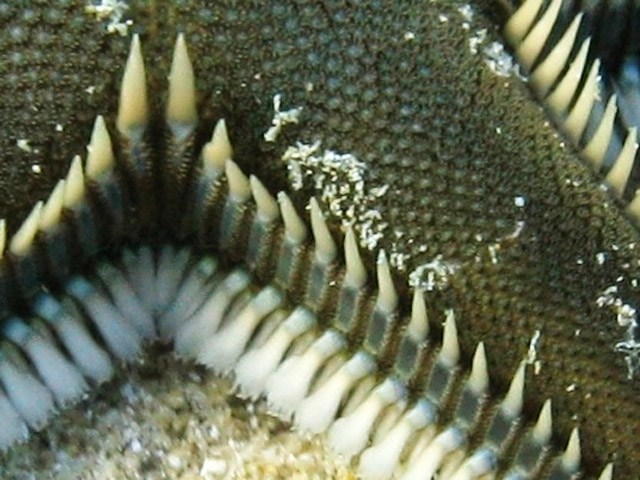
- Astropecten bispinosus on sea bottom

Scientific classification
- Kingdom: Animalia
- Phylum: Echinodermata
- Class: Asteroidea
- Order: Paxillosida
- Family: Astropectinidae
- Genus: Astropecten
- Species: A. bispinosus

Binomial name
- Astropecten bispinosus (Otto, 1823)

= Astropecten bispinosus =

Species of starfish

Astropecten bispinosus is a sea star of the family Astropectinidae from the Mediterranean Sea.

== Habitat and behaviour ==
Starfishes of genus Astropecten live on mobile seabed (sandy, muddy or gravel seabed) and they remain largely buried under sediment during the day. During the late afternoon and during the night starfishes go out to hunt mainly bivalve molluscs, which are their favourite preys. This species lives only in the Mediterranean Sea and it prefers sandy seabed near meadows of Cymodocea nodosa and it lives at depths between 2 and 100 m. This species is active and easy to find especially in the late afternoon, but sometimes it is possible to find it during the day or during the night.

== Description ==
This sea star has very narrow and high superomarginal plates with a bare area on vertical face of them (visible in the lateral side of arms between inferomarginal spines and superomarginal spines). Every superomarginal plate is equipped with 1 very long, sharp, clean conical spine usually white colour but sometime yellow or orange. The superomarginal spine is always placed on the top internal edge of plates so there aren't any bare area on top of superomarginal plates. The maximum number of superomarginal plates, observed on each arm, is 77; normally the number is between 40 and 60, depending on the size of the starfish. The pair of superomarginal spines between the arms is often longer than the other. The inferomarginal spines are long, flat, not pointed, usually kept parallel and well separated. Feature shape of this Astropecten has a very small disc and very long and thin arms. The aboral side has uniform colour and can be dark green, dark brown or rarely light brown-pink. The oral side is light coloured, usually white but it can be also yellow or orange. It has size quite large and may reach about 21 cm in diameter. This is a kind of starfish that can be distinguished by feature's shape, the high number of superomarginal plates, the bare area on vertical face of superomarginal plates, the conical superomarginal spines and by the colour. This species may be confused with Astropecten platyacanthus.

== Feeding ==
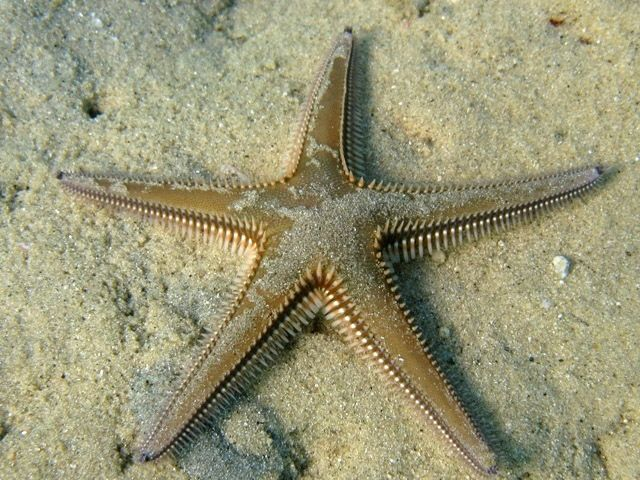
Astropecten bispinosus

This sea star is a carnivore and feeds on molluscs, which it catches with its arms and then takes to the mouth. The prey is then trapped by the long, moving prickles around the mouth cavity.
