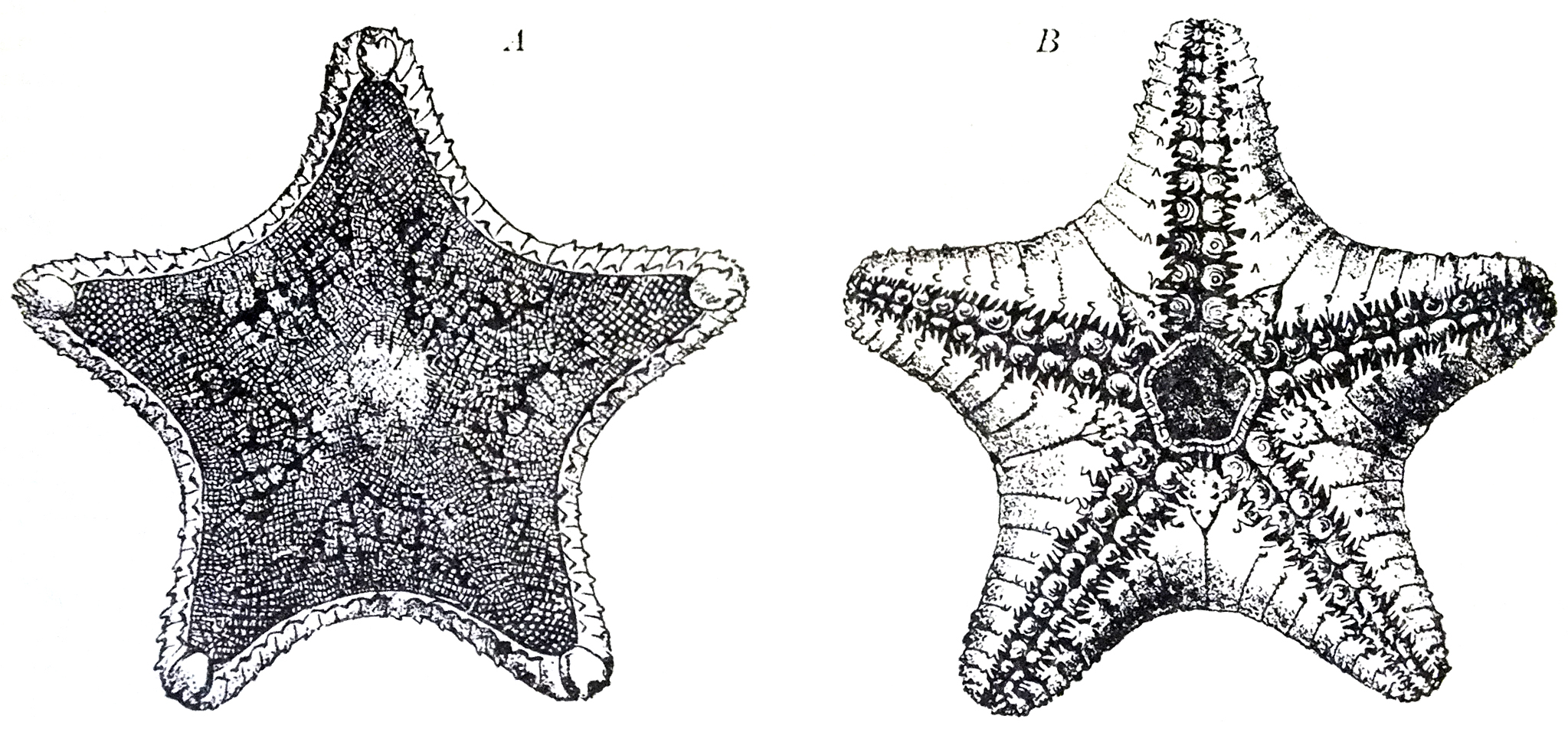
- Ctenodiscus australis

Scientific classification
- Kingdom: Animalia
- Phylum: Echinodermata
- Class: Asteroidea
- Order: Paxillosida
- Family: Ctenodiscidae; Sladen, 1889

= Ctenodiscidae =

Family of starfish

Ctenodiscidae is a family of echinoderms belonging to the order Paxillosida.

Genera:

- Ctenodiscus Müller & Troschel, 1842
- Paleoctenodiscus Blake, 1988
