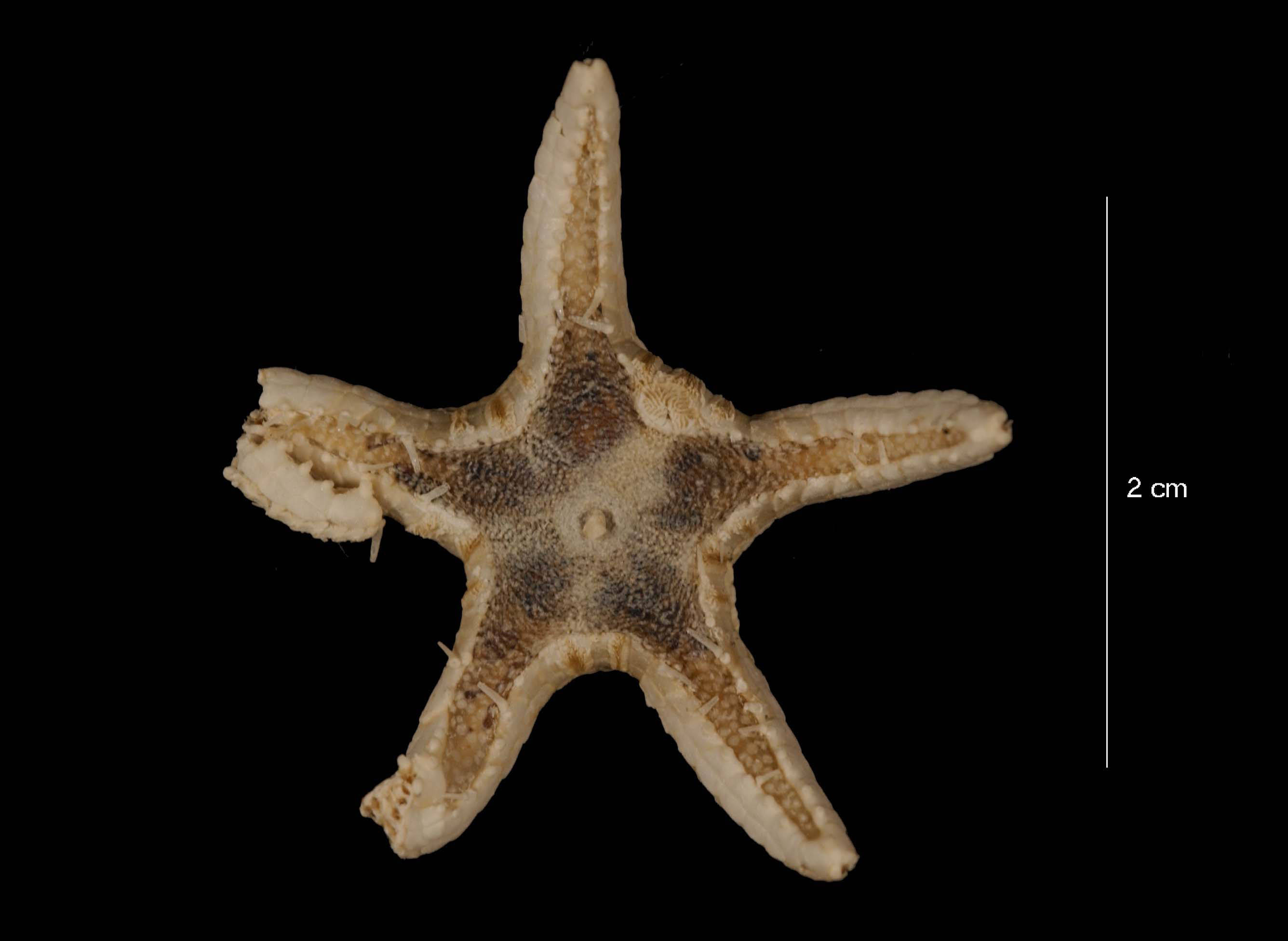
- Eremicaster crassus

Scientific classification
- Kingdom: Animalia
- Phylum: Echinodermata
- Class: Asteroidea
- Order: Paxillosida
- Family: Porcellanasteridae; Sladen, 1883

Genera
- 12, see text

= Porcellanasteridae =

Family of starfishes

The Porcellanasteridae are a family of sea stars in the order Paxillosida. These sea stars are found at abyssal depths. The World Asteroidea Database includes these genera in this family:

- Abyssaster Madsen, 1961
- Benthogenia Fisher, 1911
- Damnaster H.E.S. Clark & McKnight, 1994
- Eremicaster Fisher, 1905
- Hyphalaster Sladen, 1883
- Lethmaster Belyaev, 1969
- Lysaster Bell, 1909
- Porcellanaster Wyville Thomson, 1877
- Sidonaster Koehler, 1909
- Styracaster Sladen, 1883
- Thoracaster Sladen, 1883
- Vitjazaster Belyaev, 1969
