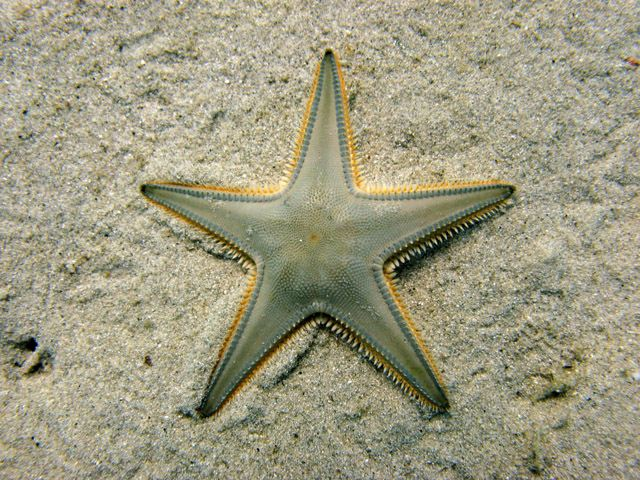

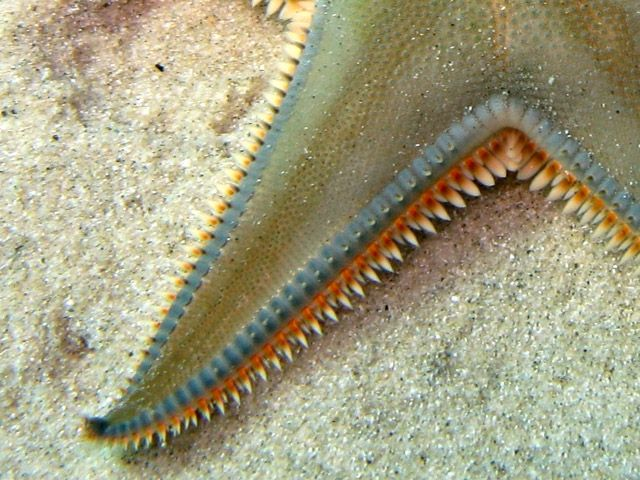
- Astropecten jonstoni on sea bottom

Scientific classification
- Kingdom: Animalia
- Phylum: Echinodermata
- Class: Asteroidea
- Order: Paxillosida
- Family: Astropectinidae
- Genus: Astropecten
- Species: A. jonstoni

Binomial name
- Astropecten jonstoni (Delle Chiaje, 1825)

= Astropecten jonstoni =

Species of starfish

Astropecten jonstoni is a sea star of the family Astropectinidae.

== Habitat and behaviour ==
Starfishes of genus Astropecten live on mobile seabed (sandy, muddy or gravel seabed) and they remain largely buried under sediment during the day. During the late afternoon and the night starfishes go out to hunt mainly bivalve molluscs, which are their favourite preys. Unlike other Astropecten, this species is active and easy to find during day, especially in early morning and late afternoon. This species lives only in the Mediterranean Sea and it prefers sandy seabed at low depths as between 1 and 12 m.

== Description ==
This sea star has superomarginal plates with a very short spines or without spines (usually the plates between the arms are devoid of spines). The inferomarginal plate has a short and pot external spine, arranged with great regularity, normally kept parallel to one another and rather rigid. The inferomarginal spines have dark orange colour at the base and white-yellowish towards the tip on going to draw a sort of orange outline at the base of the sea star. The overall shape is very peculiar with bigger disc than other species and arms rather court, triangular and very pointed that accentuates the classic shape of the star. The colour of aboral side is pretty clear with various nuances that can be tending towards beige, turquoise-green or grey-brown. It is the smallest species of Astropecten in the Mediterranean Sea with a maximum diameter of about 7–8 cm. This starfish has a lot of features and can be distinguished easily by its overall shape, size and colour. Rarely it is confused with very young specimens of Astropecten platyacanthus.

== Feeding ==
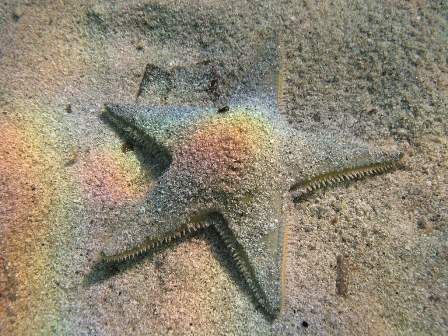
Astropecten jonstoni

This sea star is a carnivore and feeds on molluscs, which it catches with its arms and then takes to the mouth. The prey is then trapped by the long, moving prickles around the mouth cavity.
