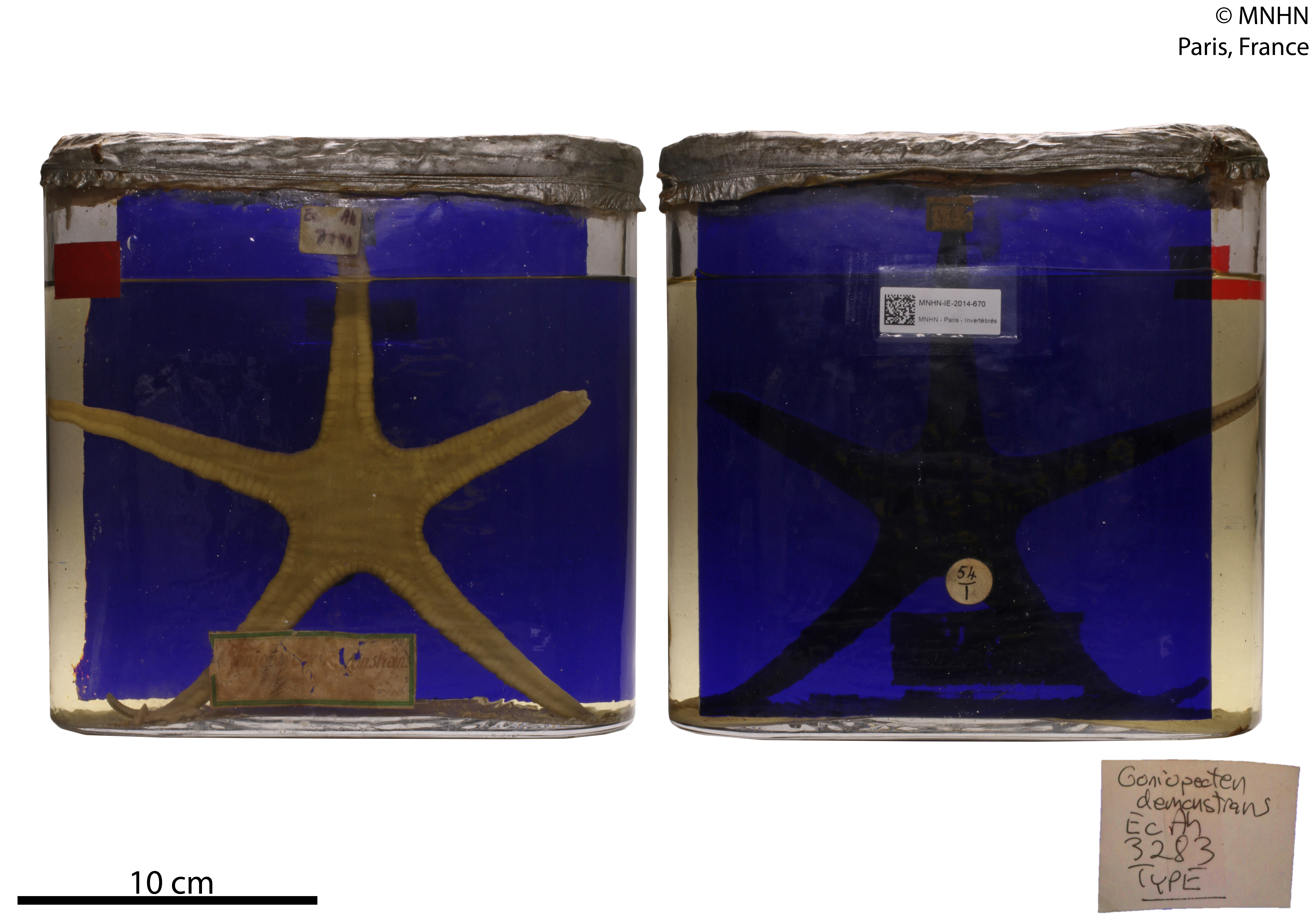
- Goniopecten demonstrans specimines

Scientific classification
- Domain: Eukaryota
- Kingdom: Animalia
- Phylum: Echinodermata
- Class: Asteroidea
- Order: Paxillosida
- Family: Goniopectinidae

= Goniopectinidae =

Family of echinoderms

Goniopectinidae is a family of echinoderms belonging to the order Paxillosida.

Genera:

- Chrispaulia Gale, 2005
- Goniopecten Perrier, 1881
- Pectinidiscus Ludwig, 1907
- Prionaster Verrill, 1899
