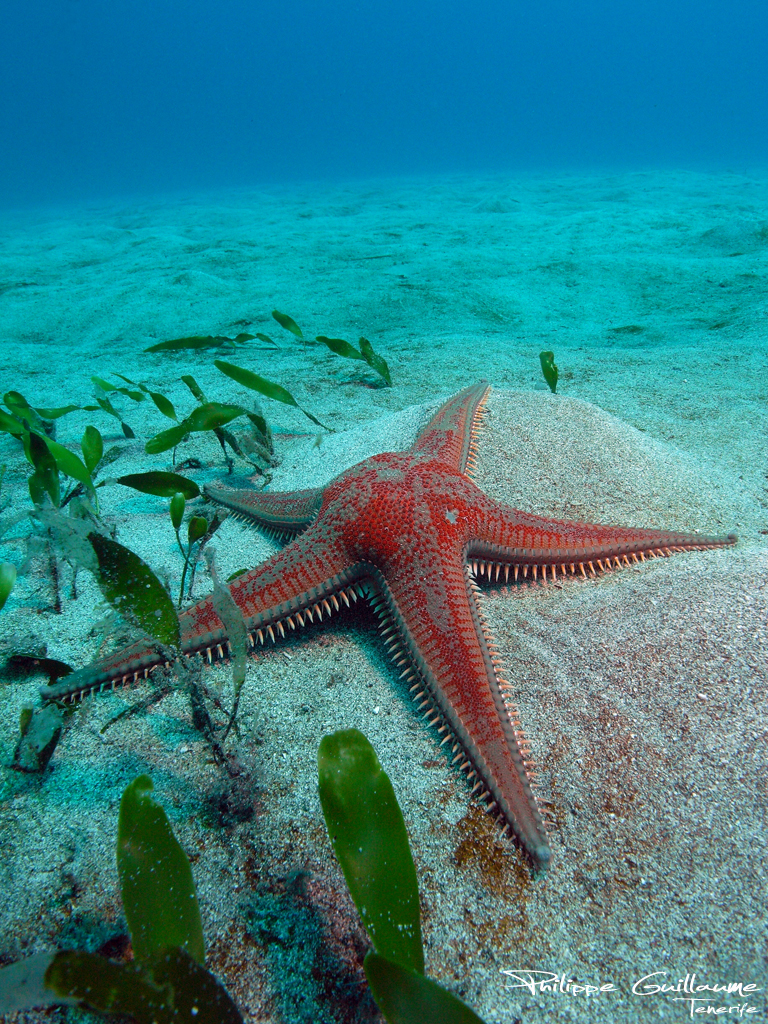
- Astropecten aranciacus

Scientific classification
- Kingdom: Animalia
- Phylum: Echinodermata
- Class: Asteroidea
- Order: Paxillosida
- Family: Astropectinidae
- Genus: Astropecten; Gray, 1840

Species
- See text.

= Astropecten =

Genus of starfishes

Astropecten is a genus of sea stars of the family Astropectinidae.

== Identification ==
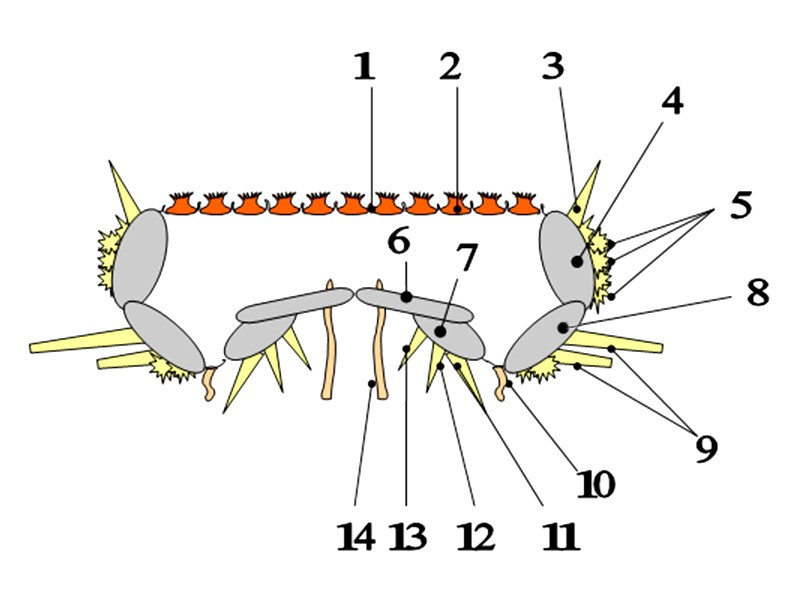
Description of arm's section of starfish genus Astropecten. 1- papulas: they are soft and retractable appendages with respiratory functions 2- paxilla 3- superomarginal spines 4- superomarginal plates 5- scales and small spines covering the vertical face of superomarginal plates 6- ambulacral plates 7- adambulacral plates 8- inferomarginal plates 9- inferomarginal spines 10- pedicellaria: special pedicels with prehensile termination necessary to grab bodies and detritus 11- external adambulacral spines 12- median adambulacral spines 13- internal adambulacral spines 14- ambulacral pedicellaria

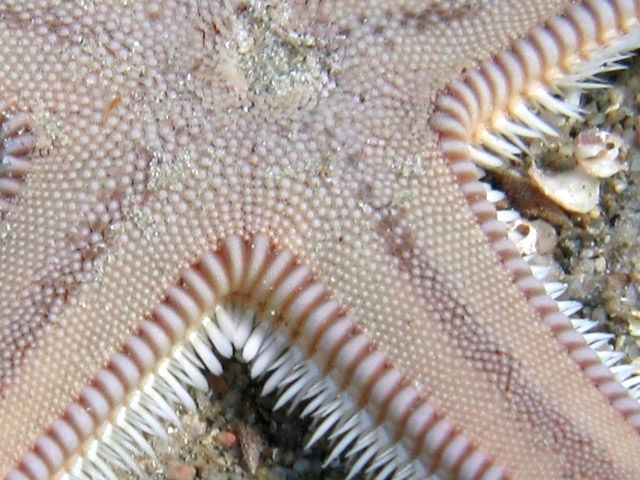
Ossicles of an Astropecten irregularis

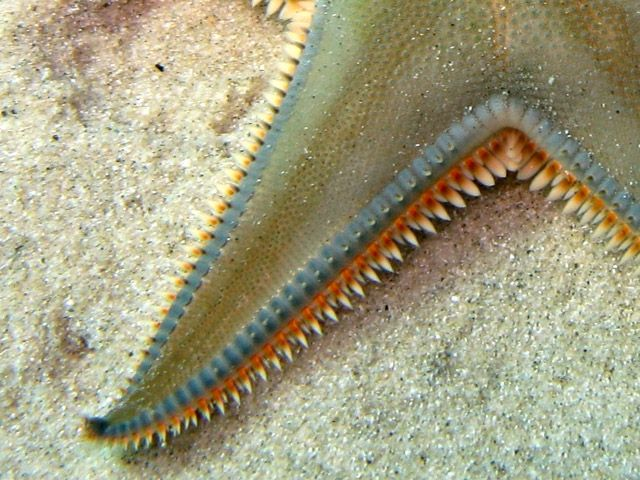
Ossicles of an Astropecten jonstoni

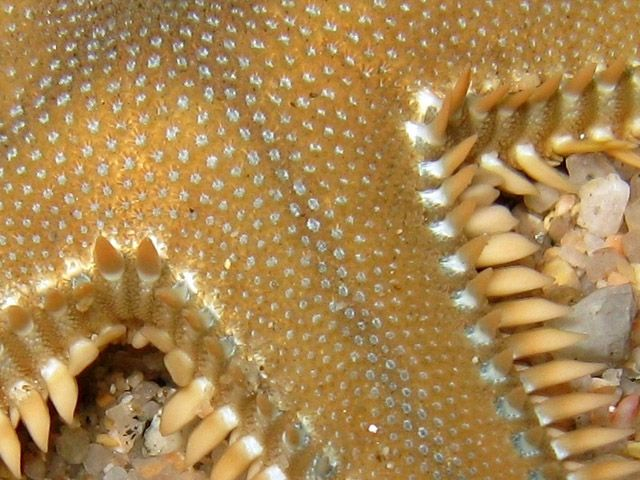
Flat ossicles of an Astropecten platyacanthus

These sea stars are similar one to each other and it can be difficult to determine with certainty the species only from a photograph. To have a certain determination, in some cases, animals should be analyzed in the laboratory or using genetic testing, but often it is not possible. In order to determine the species, with a reasonable margin of error, it is necessary to observe the appearance of the animal, in particular, based on some typical features described by principal authors that have analyzed over the years a large number of specimens in the laboratory. The main elements, to determine the various species from photo, are: the appearance of the dorsal marginal plates and spines, the size, the shape of disc and arms. For a good identification by sea photo it is important to take a complete picture of all the subject, a picture of the detail of the marginal plates and to measure as precisely as possible the diameter of the sea star. All this can be done without touching, turning it, or disturbing the animal. Starfishes have two sides: an upper side called “aboral side” (which is normally visible), and a bottom side called “oral side” (which rests on the seabed).

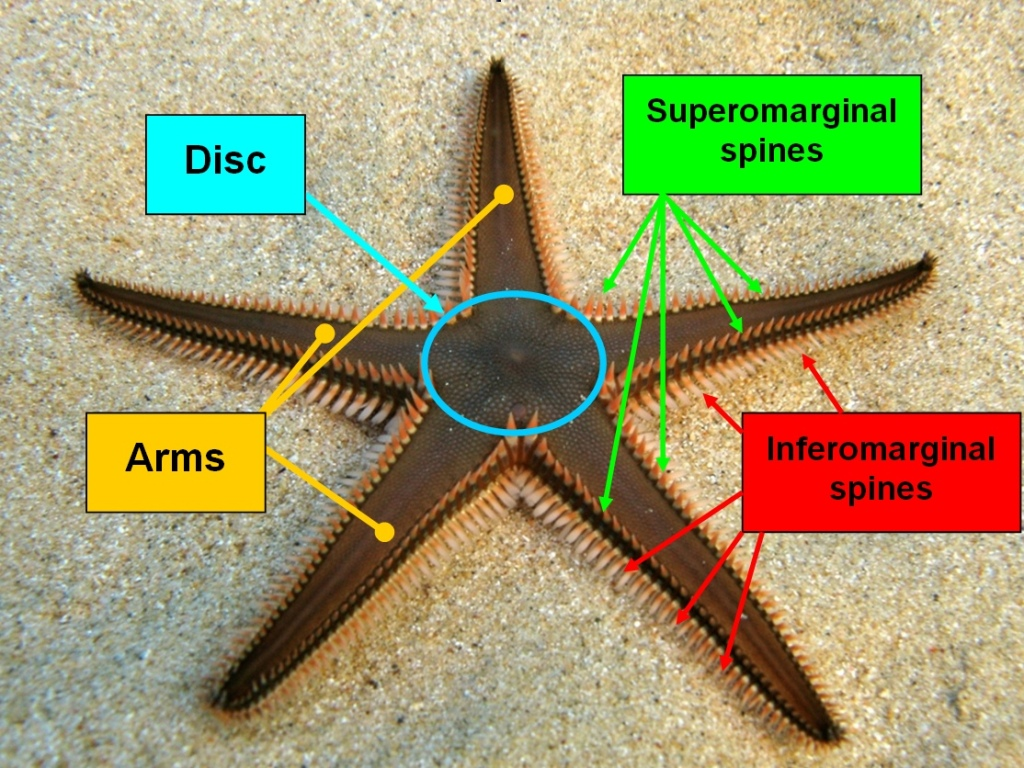
General look of an Astropecten

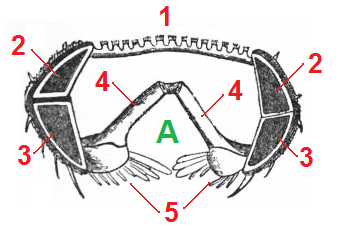
Cross-section of an arm. 1=papula and paxilla, 2=superomarginal plate, 3=inferomarginal plate, 4=ambulacral plates, 5=adambulacral plate

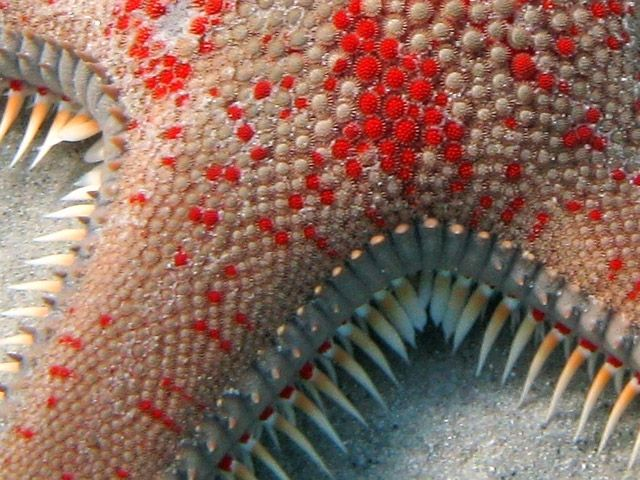
Ossicles of an Astropecten aranciacus

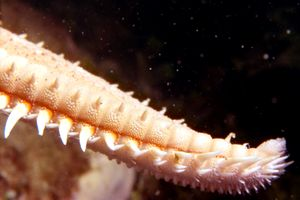
Armtip of an Astropecten aranciacus

== Species ==
- Astropecten acanthifer Sladen, 1883
- Astropecten acutiradiatus Tortonese, 1956
- Astropecten africanus Koehler, 1911
- Astropecten alatus Perrier, 1875
- Astropecten alligator Perrier, 1881
- Astropecten americanus Verrill, 1880
- Astropecten anacanthus H.L. Clark, 1926
- Astropecten andersoni Sladen, 1888
- Astropecten antillensis Lütken, 1859
- Astropecten aranciacus (Linnaeus, 1758)
- Astropecten armatus Gray, 1840
- Astropecten articulatus (Say, 1825)
- Astropecten bandanus Doderlein, 1917
- Astropecten bengalensis Doderlein, 1917
- Astropecten benthophilus Ludwig, 1905
- Astropecten bispinosus (Otto, 1823)
- Astropecten brasiliensis Müller & Troschel, 1842
- Astropecten brevispinus Sladen, 1883
- Astropecten carcharicus Doderlein, 1917
- Astropecten caribemexicanensis Caso, 1990
- Astropecten celebensis Doderlein, 1917
- Astropecten cingulatus Sladen, 1833
- Astropecten comptus Verrill, 1915
- Astropecten debilis Koehler, 1910
- Astropecten dubiosus Mortensen, 1925
- Astropecten duplicatus Gray, 1840
- Astropecten eremicus Fisher, 1913
- Astropecten eucnemis Fisher, 1919
- Astropecten euryacanthus Lutken, 1871
- Astropecten exiguus Ludwig, 1905
- Astropecten exilis Mortensen, 1933
- Astropecten fasciatus Doderlein, 1926
- Astropecten formosus Sladen, 1878
- Astropecten fragilis Verrill, 1870
- Astropecten gisselbrechti Doderlein, 1917
- Astropecten granulatus Müller & Troschel, 1842
- Astropecten griegi Koehler, 1909
- Astropecten gruveli Koehler, 1911
- Astropecten guineensis Koehler, 1911
- Astropecten hawaiiensis Doderlein, 1917
- Astropecten hemprichi Müller & Troschel, 1842
- Astropecten hermatophilus Sladen, 1883
- Astropecten huepferi Koehler, 1914
- Astropecten ibericus Perrier, 1894
- Astropecten imbellis Sladen, 1883
- Astropecten indicus Doderlein, 1888
- Astropecten inutilis Koehler, 1910
- Astropecten irregularis (Pennant, 1777)
- Astropecten jarli Madsen, 1950
- Astropecten javanicus Lutken, 1871
- Astropecten jonstoni (Delle Chiaje, 1827)
- Astropecten kagoshimensis de Loriol, 1899
- Astropecten latespinosus Meissner, 1892
- Astropecten leptus H.L. Clark, 1926
- Astropecten liberiensis Koehler, 1914
- Astropecten luzonicus Fisher, 1913
- Astropecten malayanus Doderlein, 1917
- Astropecten mamillatus Koehler, 1914
- Astropecten marginatus Gray, 1840
- Astropecten mauritianus Gray, 1840
- Astropecten michaelseni Koehler, 1914
- Astropecten minadensis Doderlein, 1917
- Astropecten monacanthus Sladen, 1883
- Astropecten nitidus Verrill, 1915
- Astropecten novaeguineae Doderlein, 1917
- Astropecten nuttingi Verrill, 1915
- Astropecten orientalis Doderlein, 1917
- Astropecten ornatissimus Fisher, 1906
- Astropecten orsinii Leipoldt, 1895
- Astropecten pedicellaris Fisher, 1913
- Astropecten petalodea Retzius, 1805
- Astropecten platyacanthus (Philippi, 1837)
- Astropecten polyacanthus Müller & Troschel, 1842
- Astropecten preissi Müller & Troschel, 1843
- Astropecten primigenius Mortensen, 1925
- Astropecten productus Fisher, 1906
- Astropecten progressor Doderlein, 1917
- Astropecten pugnax Koehler, 1910
- Astropecten pulcherrimus H.L. Clark, 1938
- Astropecten pusillulus Fisher, 1906
- Astropecten pusillus Sluiter, 1889
- Astropecten regalis Gray, 1840
- Astropecten sanctaehelenae Mortensen, 1933
- Astropecten sarasinorum Doderlein, 1917
- Astropecten scoparius Müller & Troschel, 1842
- Astropecten siderialis Verrill, 1914
- Astropecten sinicus Doderlein, 1917
- Astropecten spiniphorus Madsen, 1950
- Astropecten spinulosus (Philippi, 1837)
- Astropecten sulcatus Ludwig, 1905
- Astropecten sumbawanus Doderlein, 1917
- Astropecten tamilicus Doderlein, 1888
- Astropecten tasmanicus H.E.S Clark & D.G. McKnight, 2000
- Astropecten tenellus Fisher, 1913
- Astropecten tenuis (Bell, 1894)
- Astropecten timorensis Doderlein, 1917
- Astropecten triacanthus (Goto, 1914)
- Astropecten triseriatus Müller & Troschel, 1843
- Astropecten umbrinus Grube, 1866
- Astropecten validispinosus Oguro, 1982
- Astropecten vappa Müller & Troschel, 1843
- Astropecten variegatus Mortensen, 1933
- Astropecten velitaris von Martens, 1865
- Astropecten verrilli deLoriol, 1899
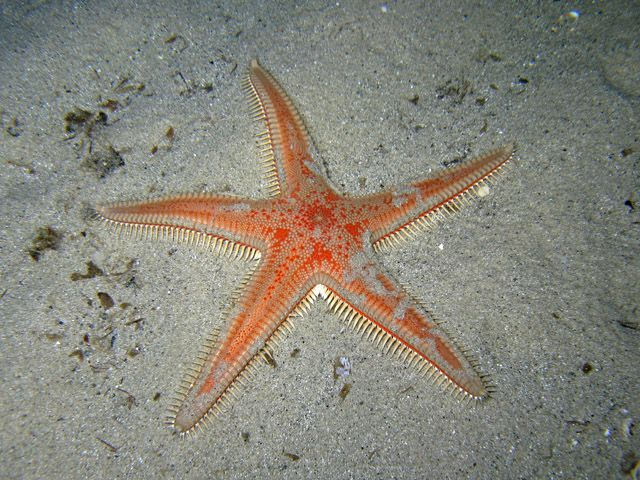
Astropecten aranciacus

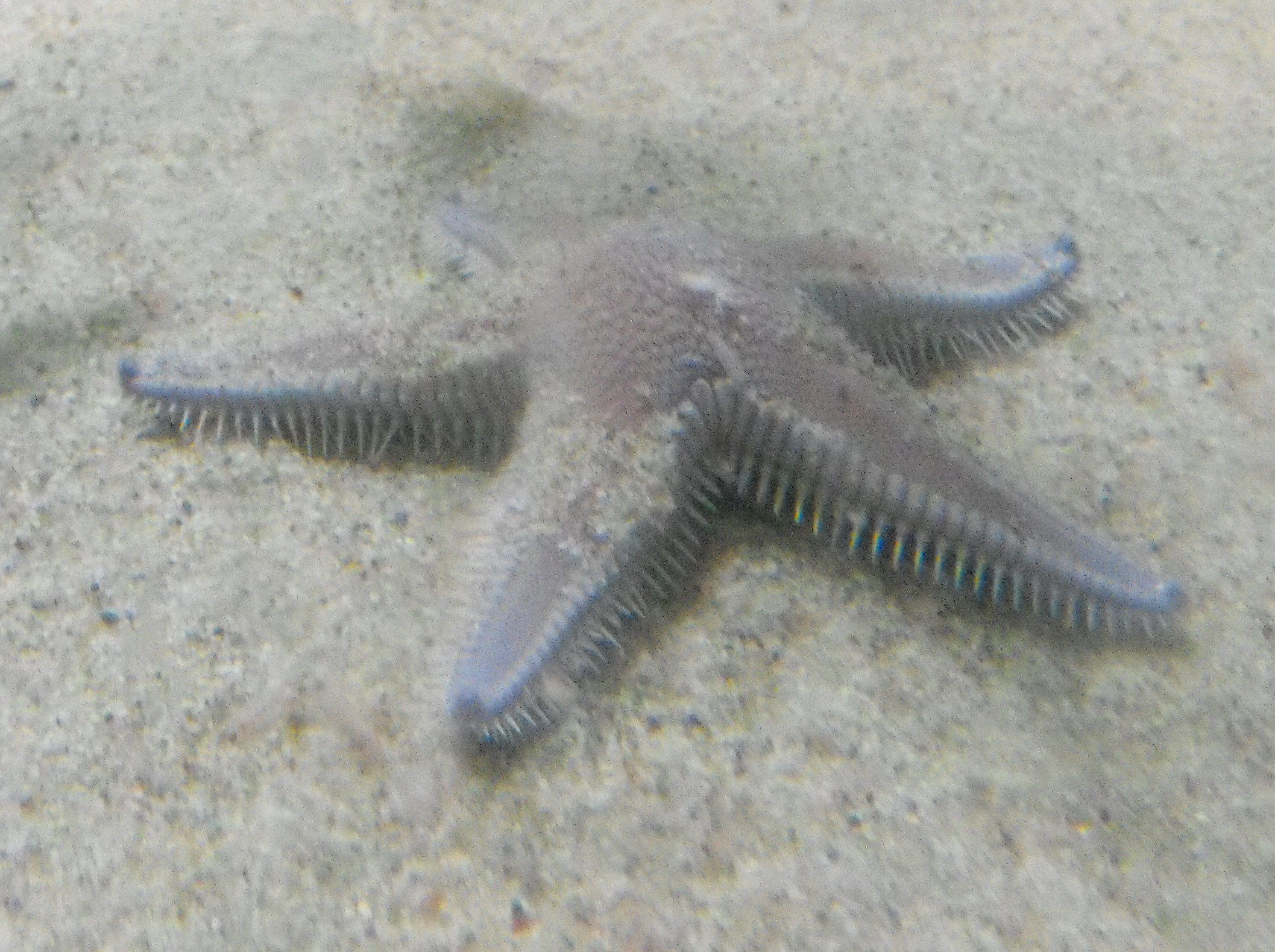
Astropecten armatus

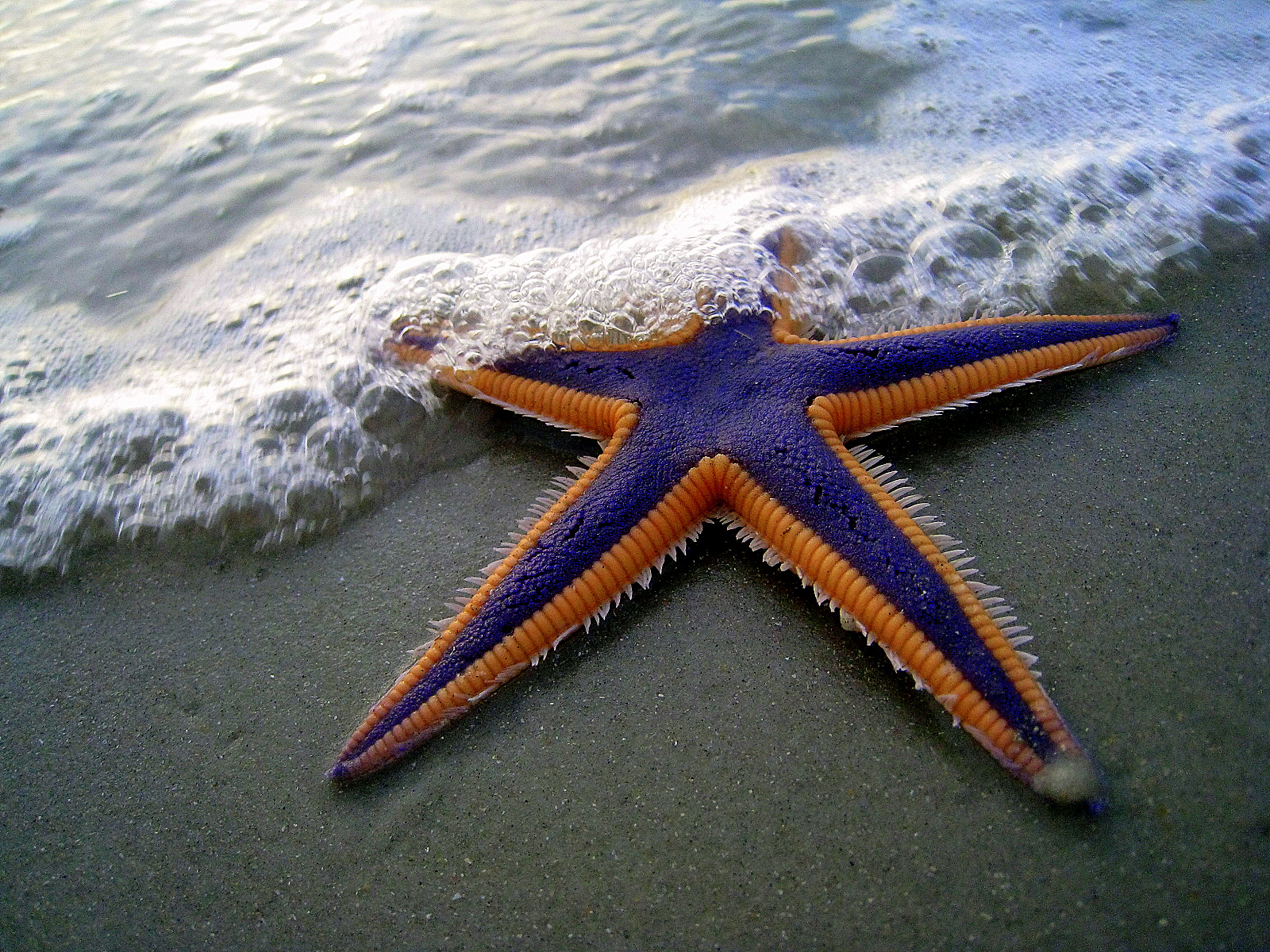
Astropecten articulatus

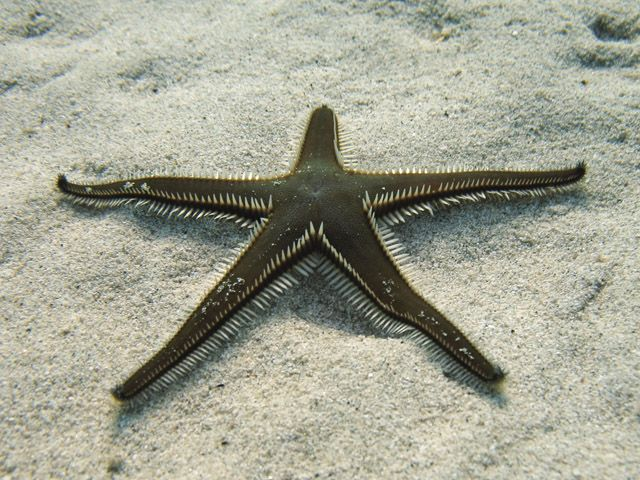
Astropecten bispinosus

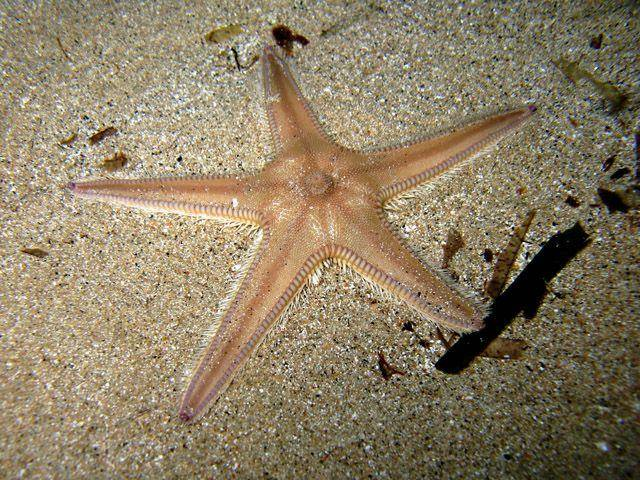
Astropecten irregularis

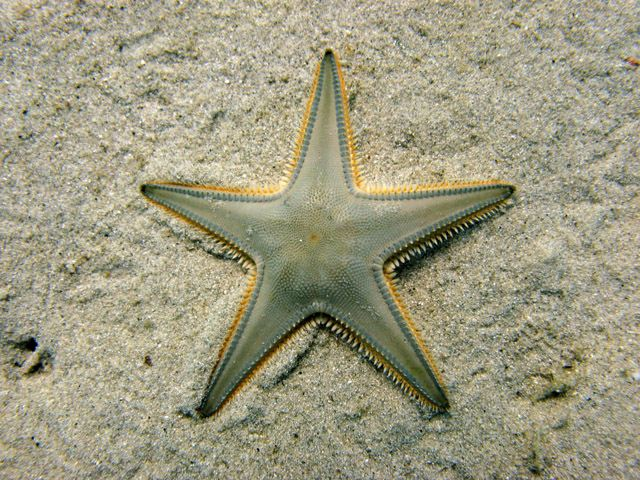
Astropecten jonstoni

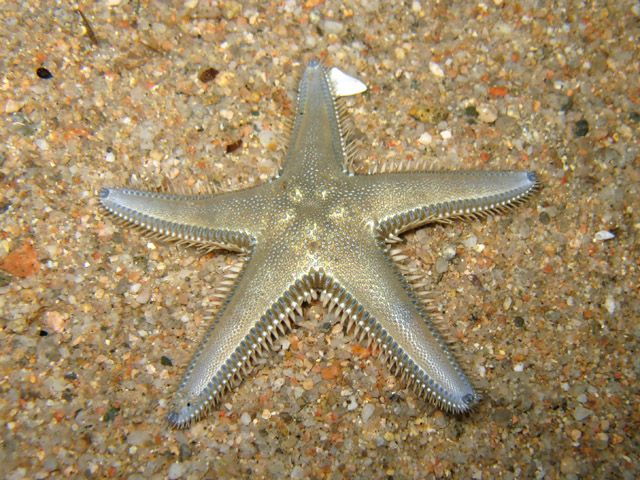
Astropecten platyacanthus

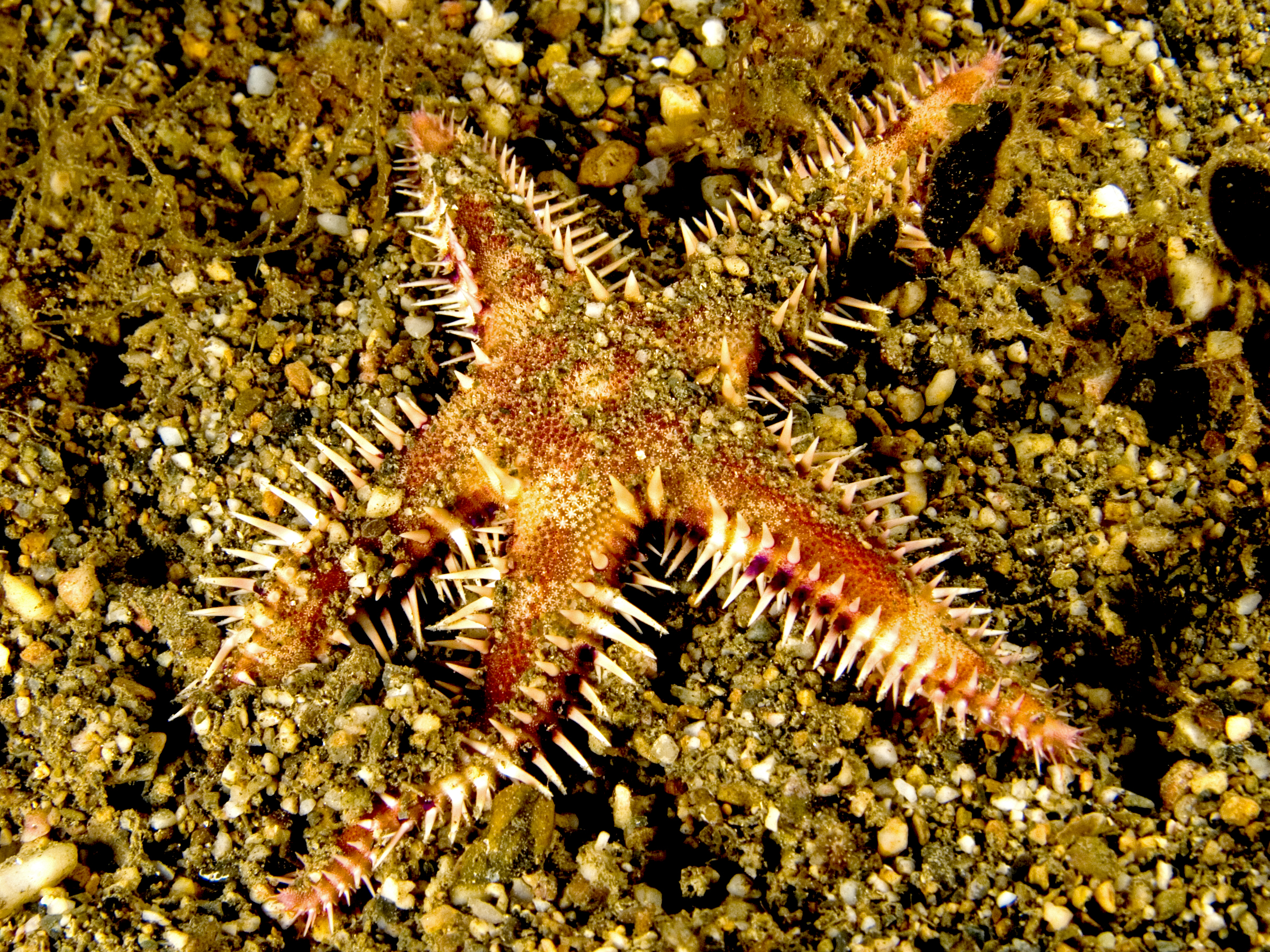
Astropecten polycanthus

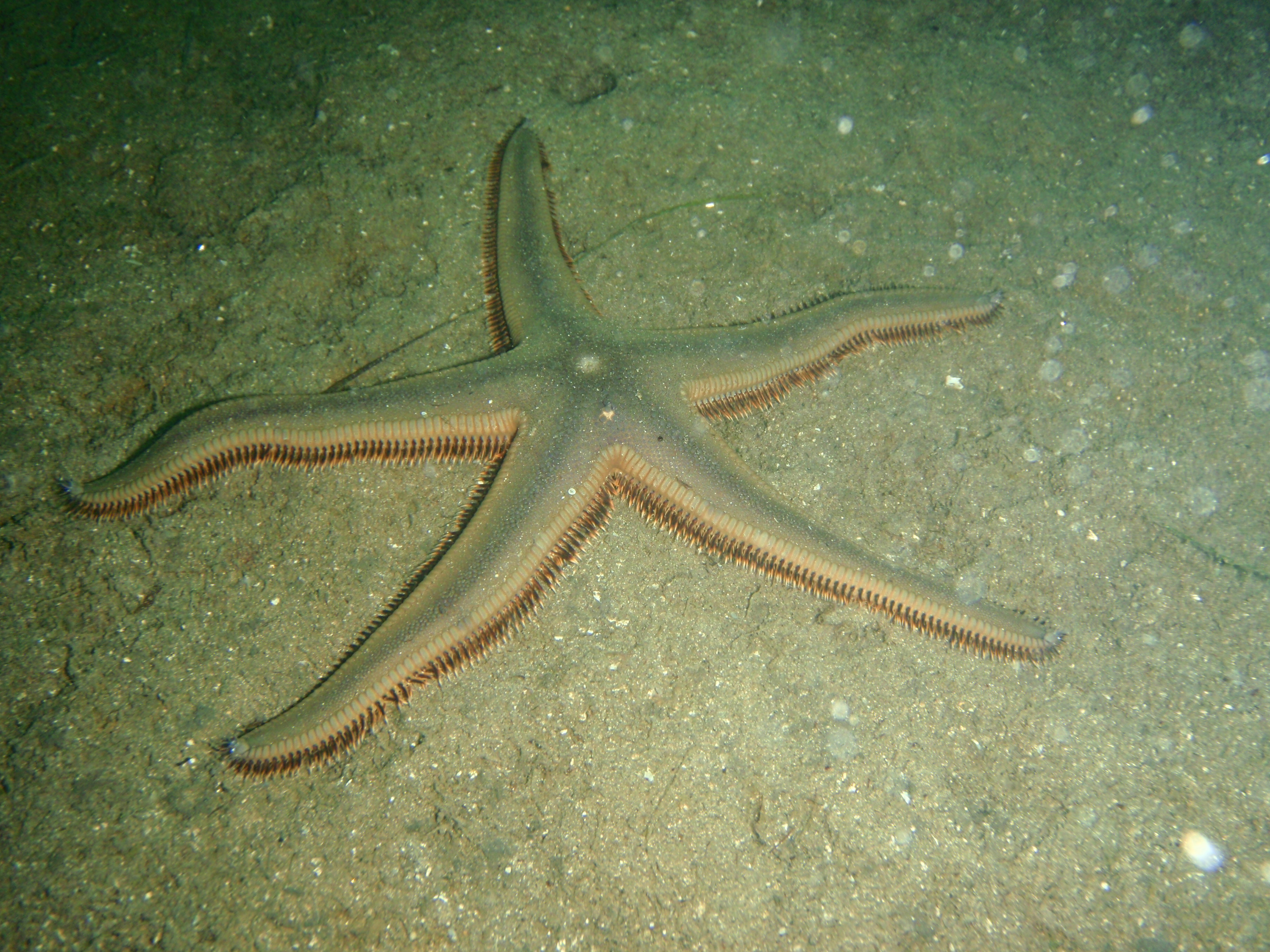
Astropecten preissei

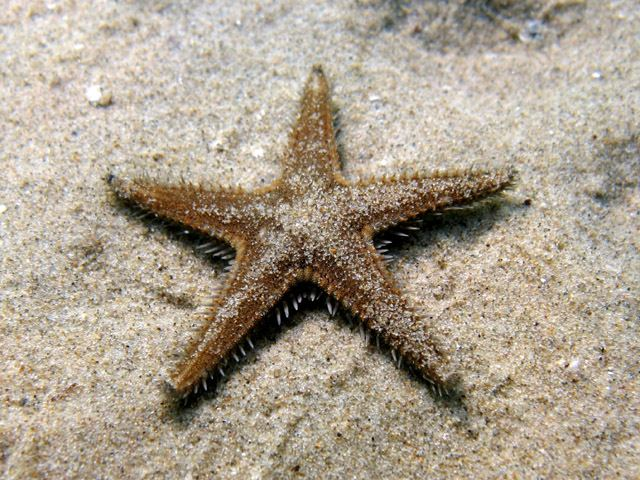
Astropecten spinulosus

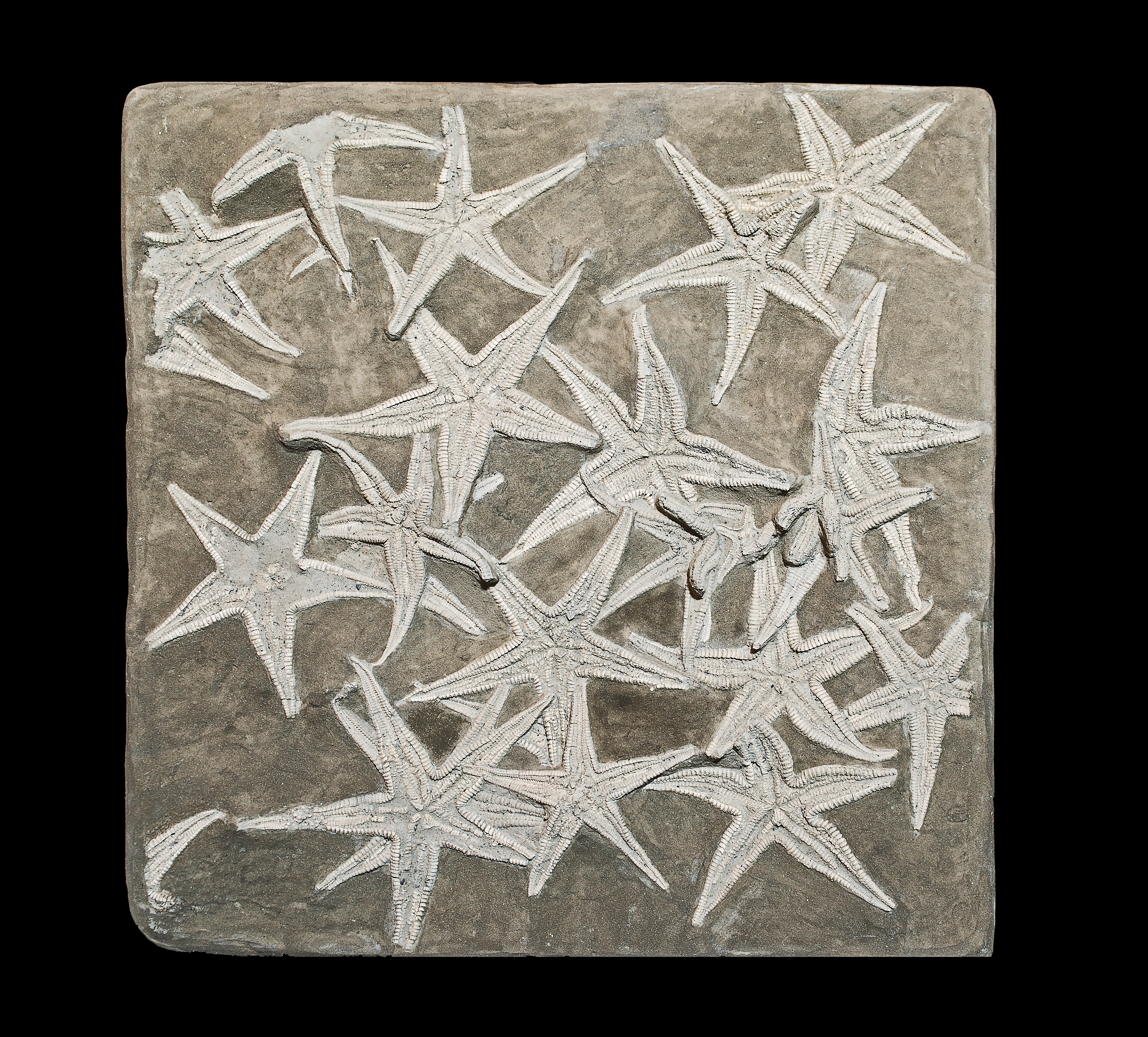
Astropecten lorioli (extinct, from the Jurassic)

=== Mediterranean species ===
Six species of Astropecten currently live in the Mediterranean Sea:

- Astropecten aranciacus (Linnaeus, 1758)
- Astropecten bispinosus (Otto, 1823)
- Astropecten irregularis (Pennant, 1777)
- Astropecten jonstoni (Delle Chiaje, 1825)
- Astropecten platyacanthus (Philippi, 1837)
- Astropecten spinulosus (Philippi, 1837)
