= Brachiolaria =

Second stage of larval development in starfishes

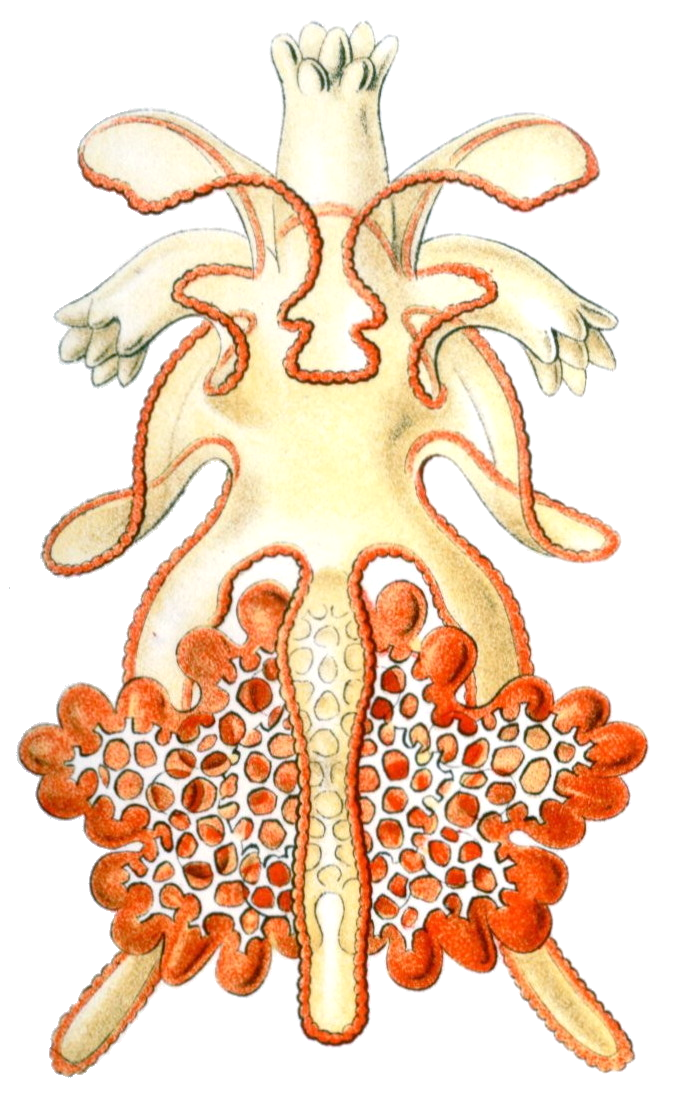
Older brachiolaria larva of Asterias sp. from below, anterior end at top From Ernst Haeckel's Kunstformen der Natur (1904)

A brachiolaria is the second stage of larval development in many starfishes. It follows the bipinnaria. Brachiolaria have bilateral symmetry, unlike the adult starfish, which have a pentaradial symmetry. Starfish of the order Paxillosida (Astropecten and Asterina) have no brachiolaria stage, with the bipinnaria developing directly into an adult.

The brachiolaria develops from the bipinnaria larva when the latter grows three short arms at the underside of its anterior end. These arms each bear sticky cells at the tip, and they surround an adhesive sucker. The larva soon sinks to the bottom, attaching itself to the substrate, firstly with the tips of the arms, and then with the sucker. Once attached, it begins to metamorphose into the adult form.

The adult starfish develops only from the hind-part of the larva, away from the sucker. It is from this part that the arms of the adult grow, with the larval arms eventually degenerating and disappearing. The digestive system of the larva also degenerates, and is almost entirely rebuilt. A new mouth forming on the left side of the body, which eventually becomes the lower, or oral, surface of the adult. Similarly, a new anus forms on the right side, which becomes the upper, or aboral, surface.

The coelom, or body cavity is divided into three chambers in the larva, two of which form the water vascular system, while the other remains as the adult body cavity. Once the tube feet develop from the water vascular system, the larva frees itself from the bottom. At around the same time, the skeleton begins to develop, initially in a ring around the anus; at this point the larva has developed into an adult, although it will continue to grow for some years before reaching sexual maturity.
