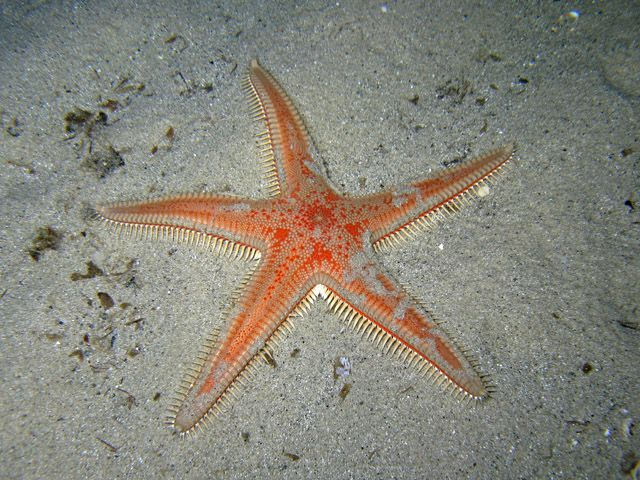
- Astropecten aranciacus on sea bottom
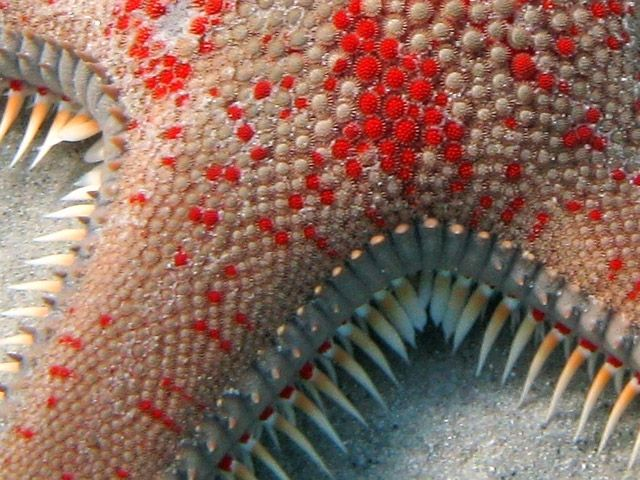
- Detail of paxillae with the top red-orange or grey-beige

Scientific classification
- Kingdom: Animalia
- Phylum: Echinodermata
- Class: Asteroidea
- Order: Paxillosida
- Family: Astropectinidae
- Genus: Astropecten
- Species: A. aranciacus

Binomial name
- Astropecten aranciacus (Linnaeus, 1758)

Synonyms
- Asterias aranciaca Linnaeus, 1758; Asterias aurantiaca Tiedemann, 1816; Astropecten antarcticus Studer, 1884; Astropecten aurantiaca Gray, 1840; Astropecten crenaster Dujardin & Hupé, 1862; Astropecten meridionalis Studer, 1876; Astropecten perarmatus Perrier, 1869

= Astropecten aranciacus =

Species of starfish

Astropecten aranciacus, the red comb star, is a sea star of the family Astropectinidae. It is native to the east Atlantic Ocean (Portugal to Angola) and the Mediterranean Sea.
