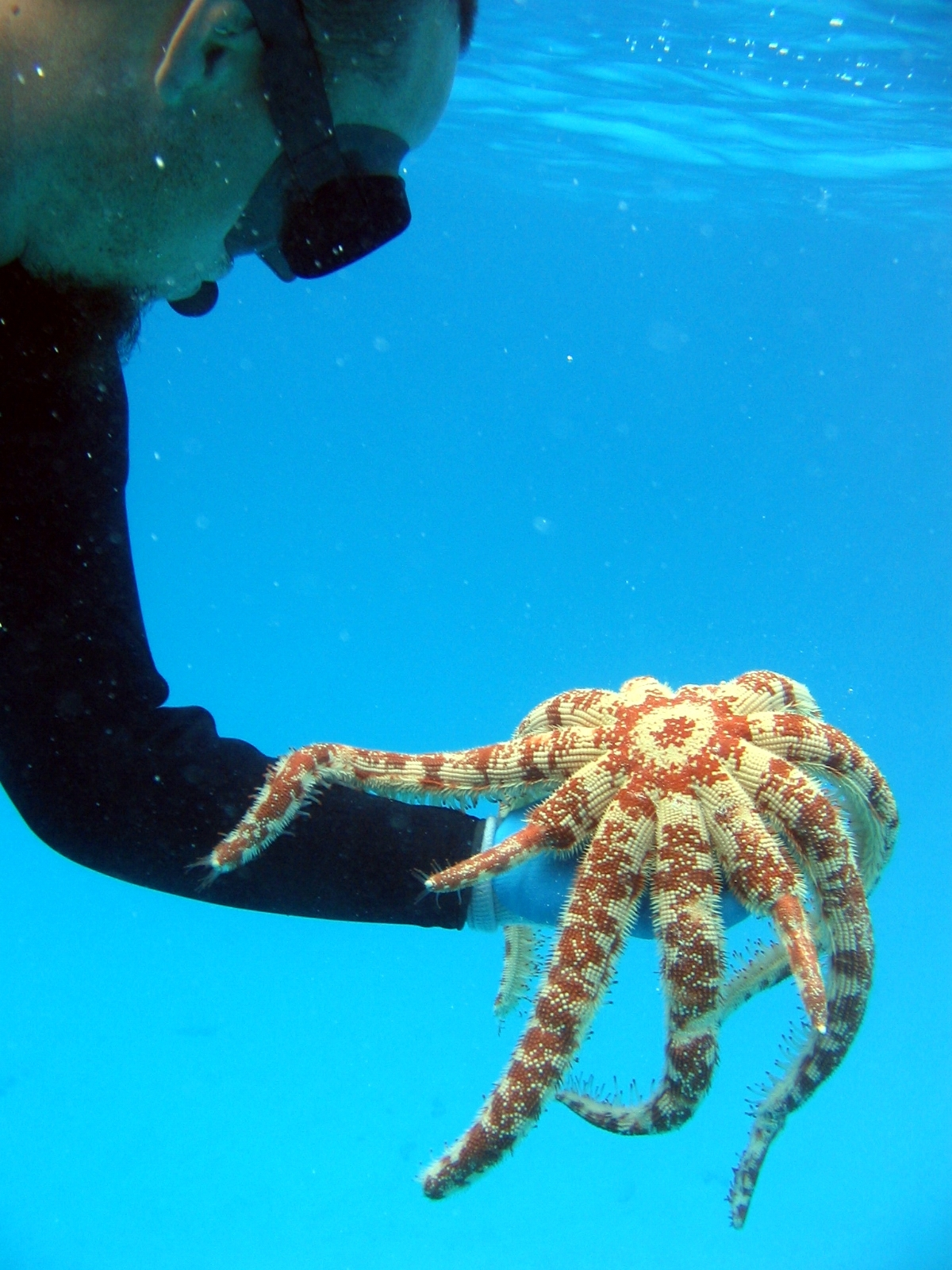
- Luidia magnifica

Scientific classification
- Kingdom: Animalia
- Phylum: Echinodermata
- Class: Asteroidea
- Superorder: Valvatacea
- Order: Paxillosida; Perrier, 1884

Families
- See text

= Paxillosida =

Order of starfishes

The Paxillosida are a large order of sea stars.

== Characteristics ==
Paxillosida adults lack an anus and have no suckers on their tube feet. They do not develop the brachiolaria stage in their early development, and use the larval tube feet to attach to the seafloor when they settle out of the plankton instead of the attachment complex seen in other starfish species. They possess marginal plates, and have sessile pedicellariae. They mostly inhabit soft-bottomed environments of sand or mud.

The order are found globally and occupy a wide bathymetric range. In the exclusively bathyal and abyssal Porcellanasteridae, includes some of the deepest dwelling of all Asteroidea. The Porcellanasteridae is principally infaunal, with species generally found living buried beneath the surface of soft, generally muddy, substrate. In this, and in the similarly infaunal families Ctenodiscidae and Goniopectinidae, species have developed specialised intermarginal fascioles known as cribiform organs which act as respiratory 'pumps' that draw in water to produce a current around the animal when it is buried.

== Systematics ==
The taxonomic position of the Paxillosida is not yet fully resolved, in part due to disagreement as to whether the unusual characters of paxillosid larvae and tube-feet represent the ancestral state for Asteroidea or are derived for living on soft sediments. More recent analyses supports a more derived position and suggest that they may be a sister taxon to the Valvatida.

The order is currently divided into the following families:

- family Astropectinidae Gray, 1840
- family Benthopectinidae Verrill, 1899
- family Ctenodiscidae Sladen, 1889
- family Goniopectinidae Verrill, 1889
- family Luidiidae Sladen, 1889
- family Paleobenthopectinidae Blake, 1984 †
- family Porcellanasteridae Sladen, 1883
- family Pseudarchasteridae Sladen, 1889
- family Radiasteridae Fisher, 1916
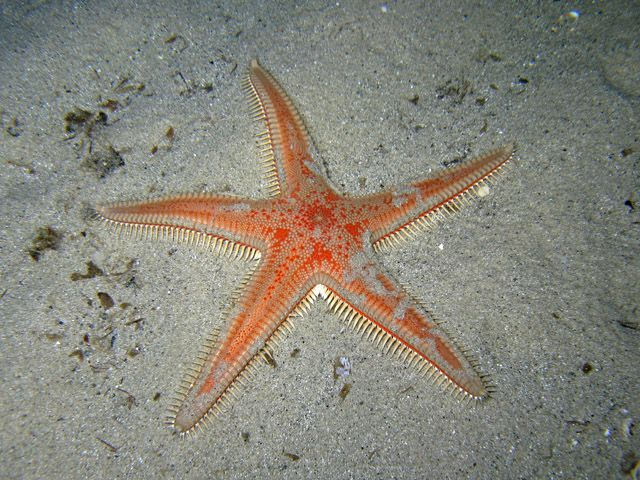
Astropecten aranciacus

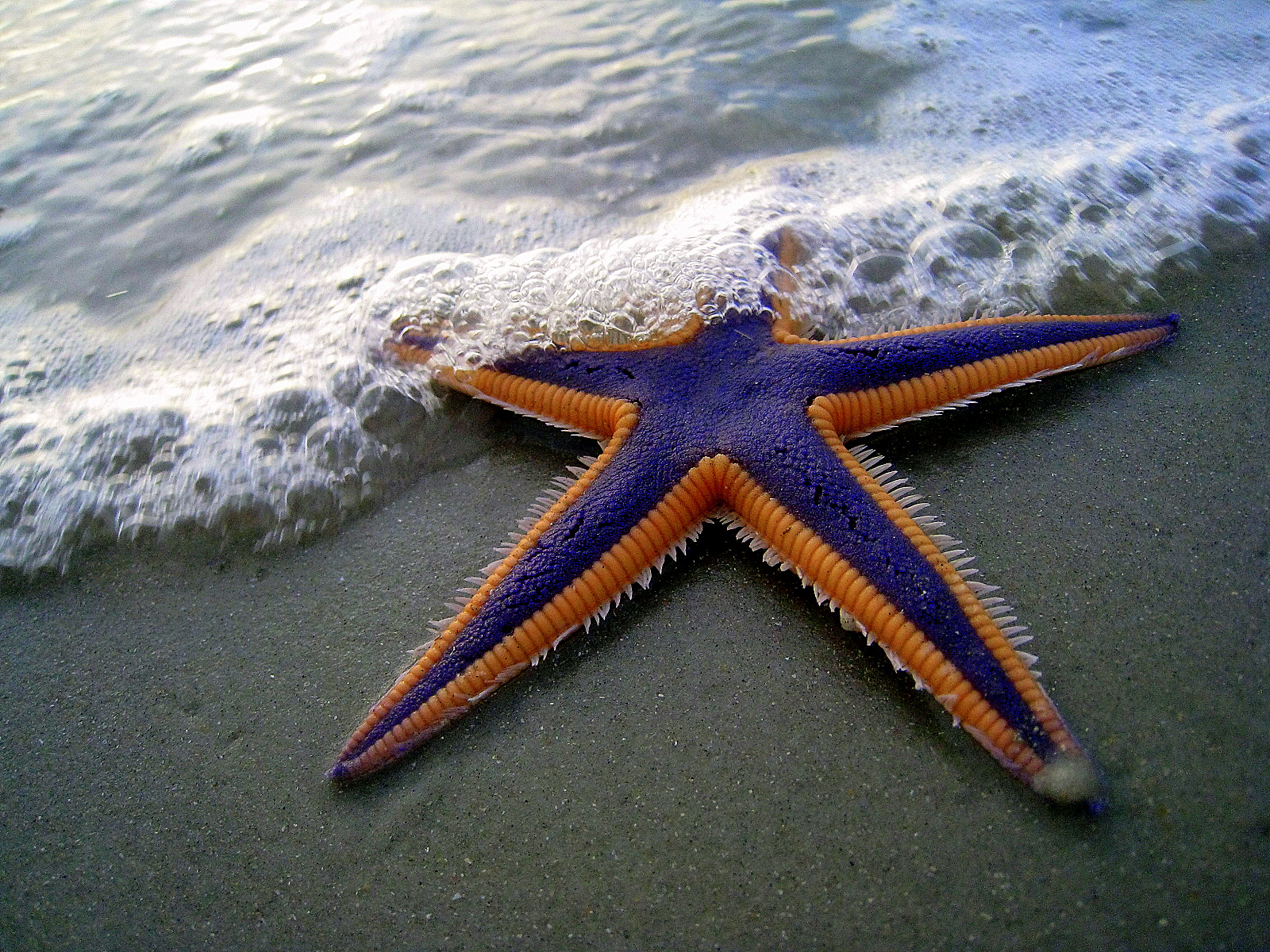
Astropecten articulatus

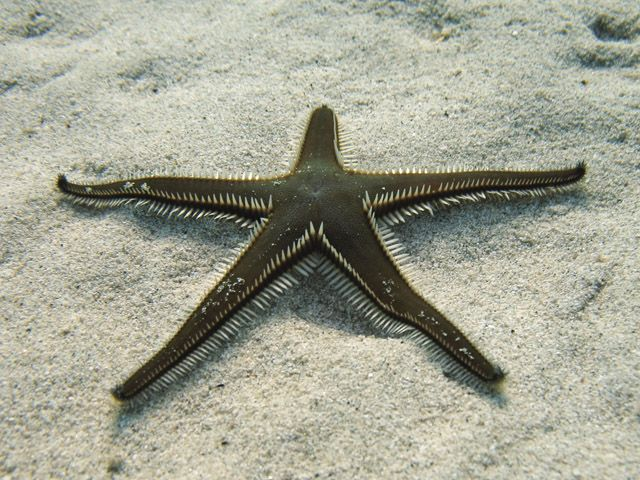
Astropecten bispinosus
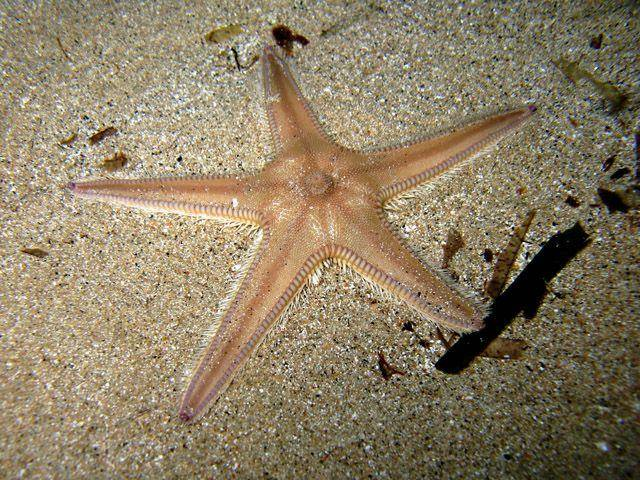
Astropecten irregularis

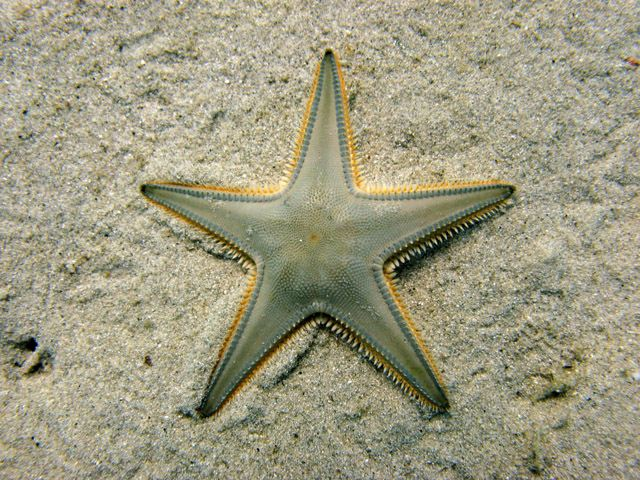
Astropecten jonstoni

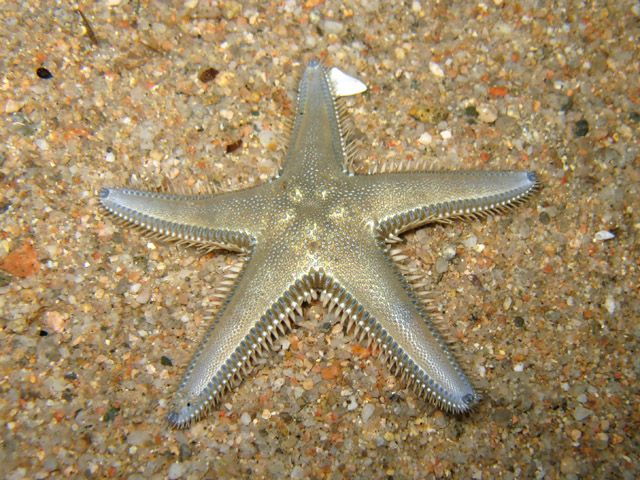
Astropecten platyacanthus

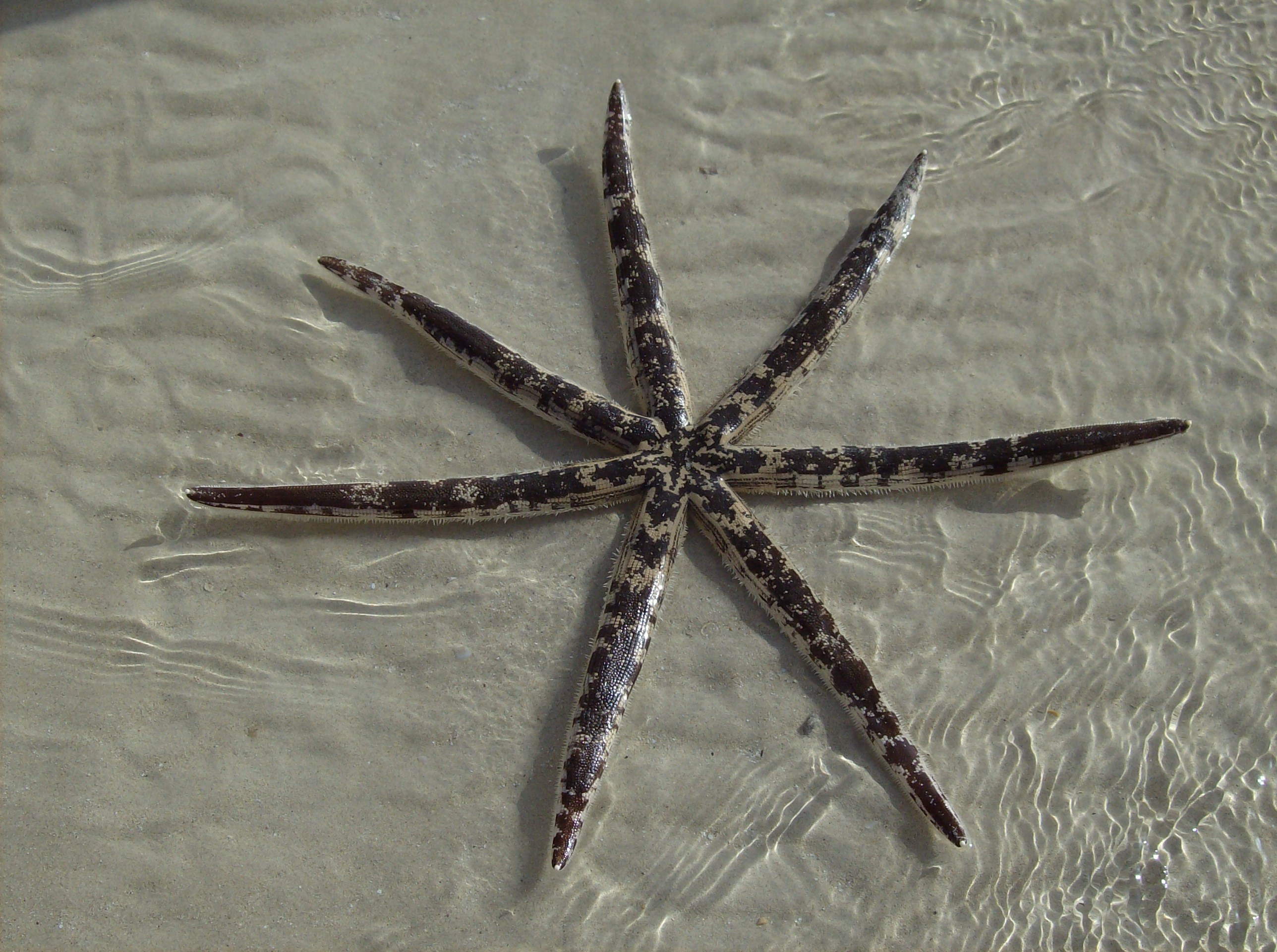
Luidia ciliaris

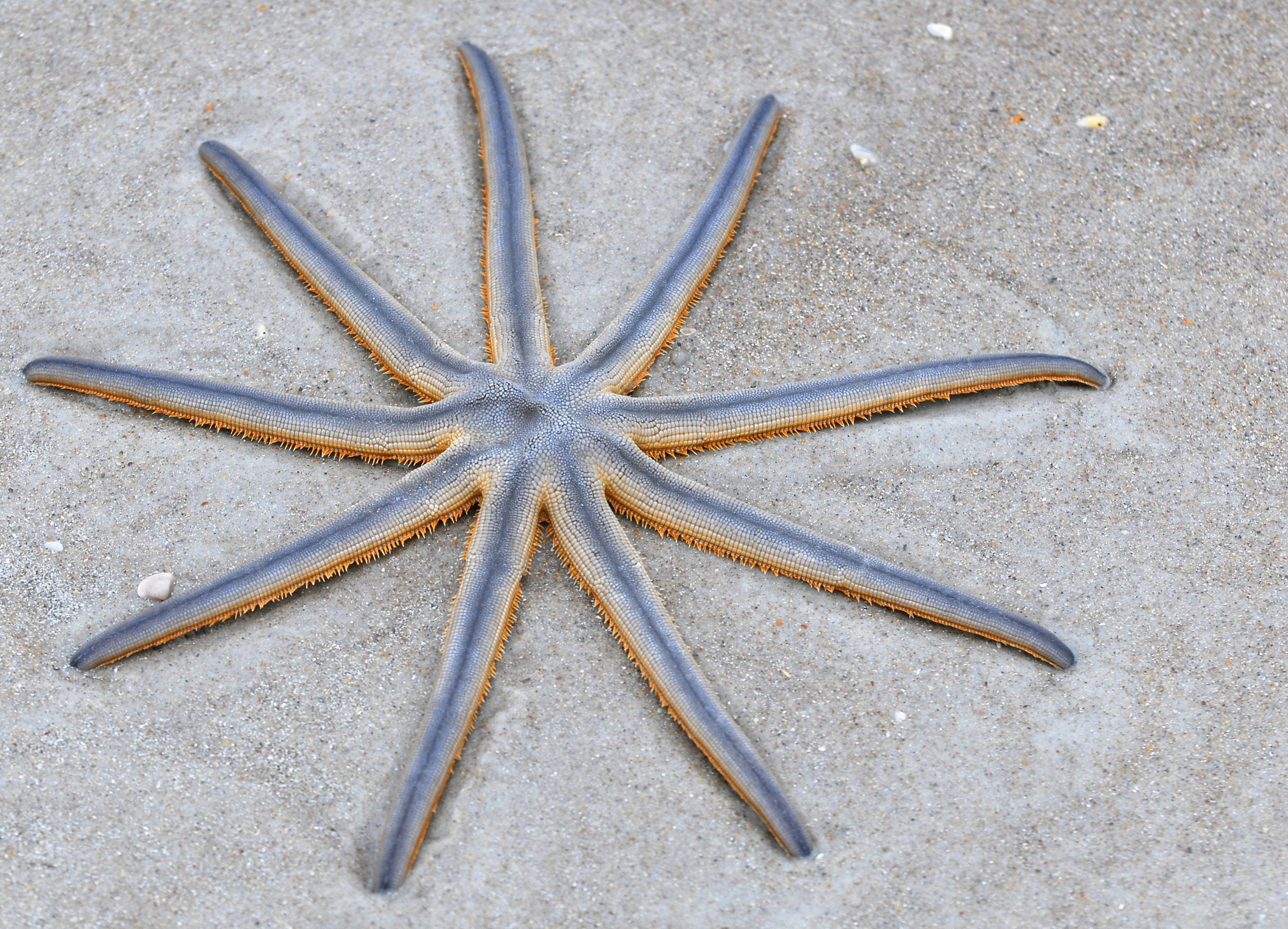
Luidia senegalensis

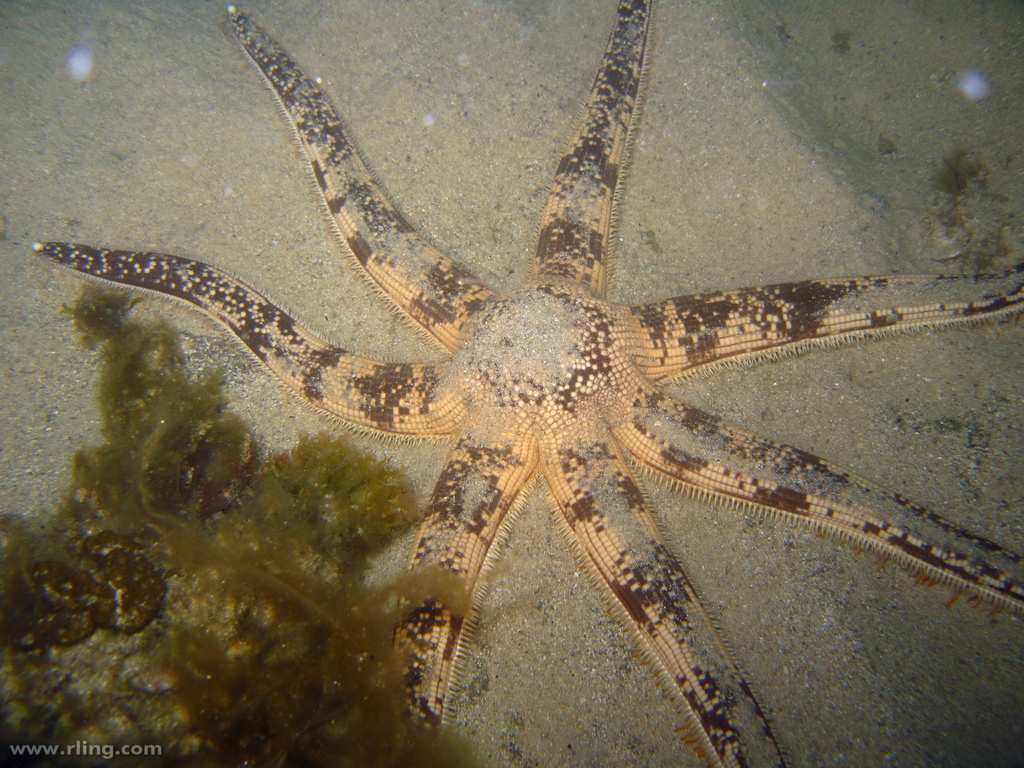
Luidia australiae
