= Rose sea star =

Rose sea star is a common name for several starfish and may refer to:

- Crossaster papposus, native to the Arctic, North Pacific, and North Atlantic oceans
- Nardoa rosea, native to the Indo-Pacific
