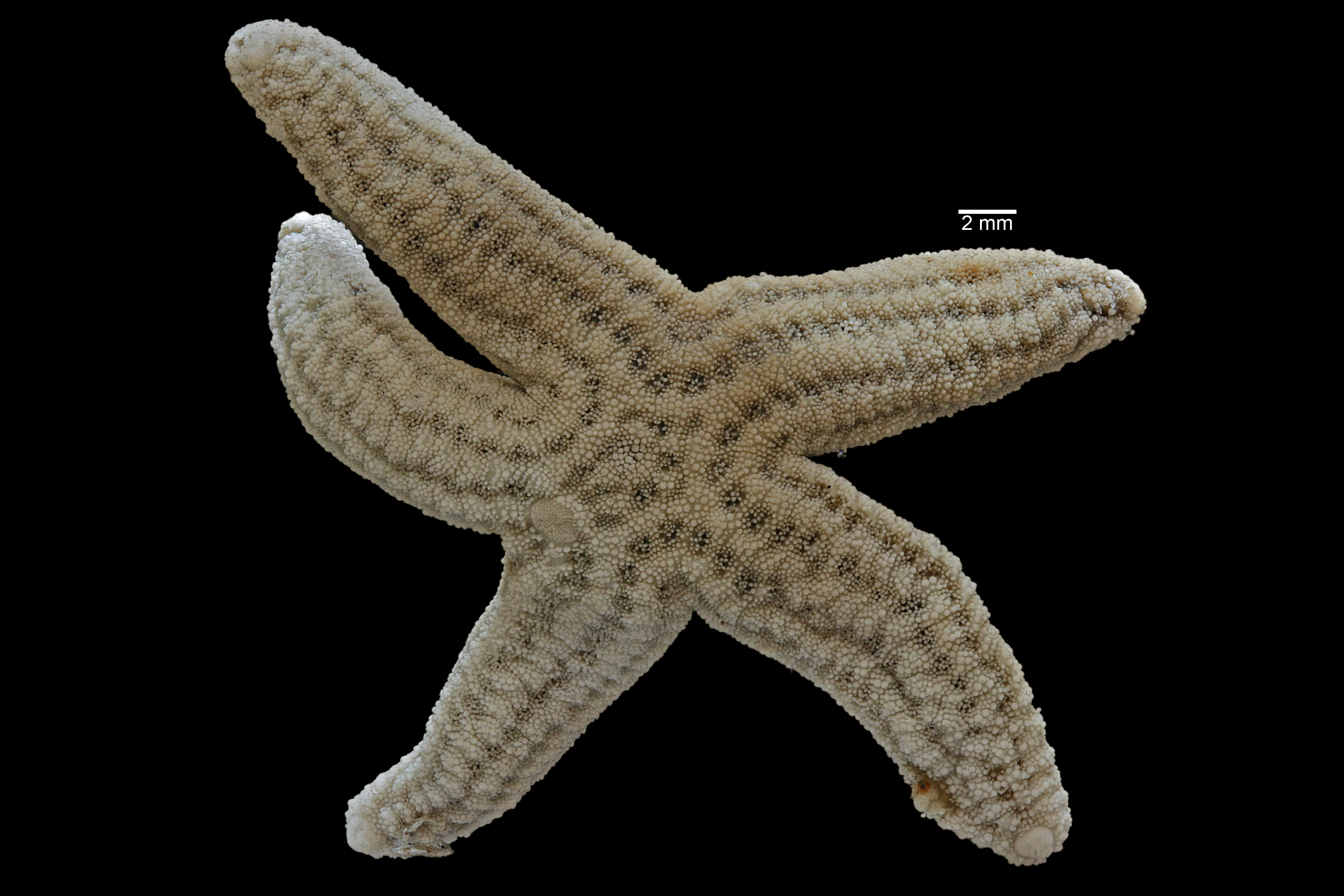

Scientific classification
- Kingdom: Animalia
- Phylum: Echinodermata
- Class: Asteroidea
- Order: Valvatida
- Family: Ophidiasteridae
- Genus: Ophidiaster
- Species: O. granifer

Binomial name
- Ophidiaster granifer Lütken, 1871

Synonyms
- Ophidiaster trychnus Fisher, 1913

= Ophidiaster granifer =

Species of starfish

Ophidiaster granifer, the grained seastar, is a species of starfish in the family Ophidiasteridae. It is found in the Red Sea and the Indo-Pacific and is the only known species of starfish to reproduce by parthenogenesis.

== Description ==
Ophidiaster granifer is a small five armed starfish with a cryptic mottled brown colouration. It has a rough, granular appearance and grows to a diameter of about 10 cm (4 in). The disc is quite small and the medium-length, fairly broad arms have rounded tips.

== Biology ==
No male Ophidiaster granifer has ever been identified and all known adults are female. As far as is known, Ophidiaster granifer is the only member of the phylum Echinodermata to reproduce exclusively by parthenogenesis. In this species, eggs are liberated into the sea in a synchronous spawning event but no fertilisation takes place. The eggs are large, with a diameter of 0.6 millimetres (0.024 in) and the mother attaches some of them to the underside of boulders. Here they develop until they undergo metamorphosis into juvenile starfish. Other eggs are planktonic and drift with the currents. In either case, the larvae are lecithotrophic and feed off the yolks of their eggs. This reproductive strategy may be linked to the starfish's low fecundity rate and its low population density.

== Distribution and habitat ==
Ophidiaster granifer is found on coral reefs in shallow waters in the Red Sea and Indo-Pacific Ocean. It is known from the South China Sea, Japan, Tonga, Fiji, Samoa, northern and western Australia, the Great Barrier Reef, New Guinea, Indonesia, the East Indies and the Philippines. It usually hides under boulders and is found on outer reef flats and patch reefs in lagoons, among broken coral rubble and among the dead bases of tangled coral thickets.
