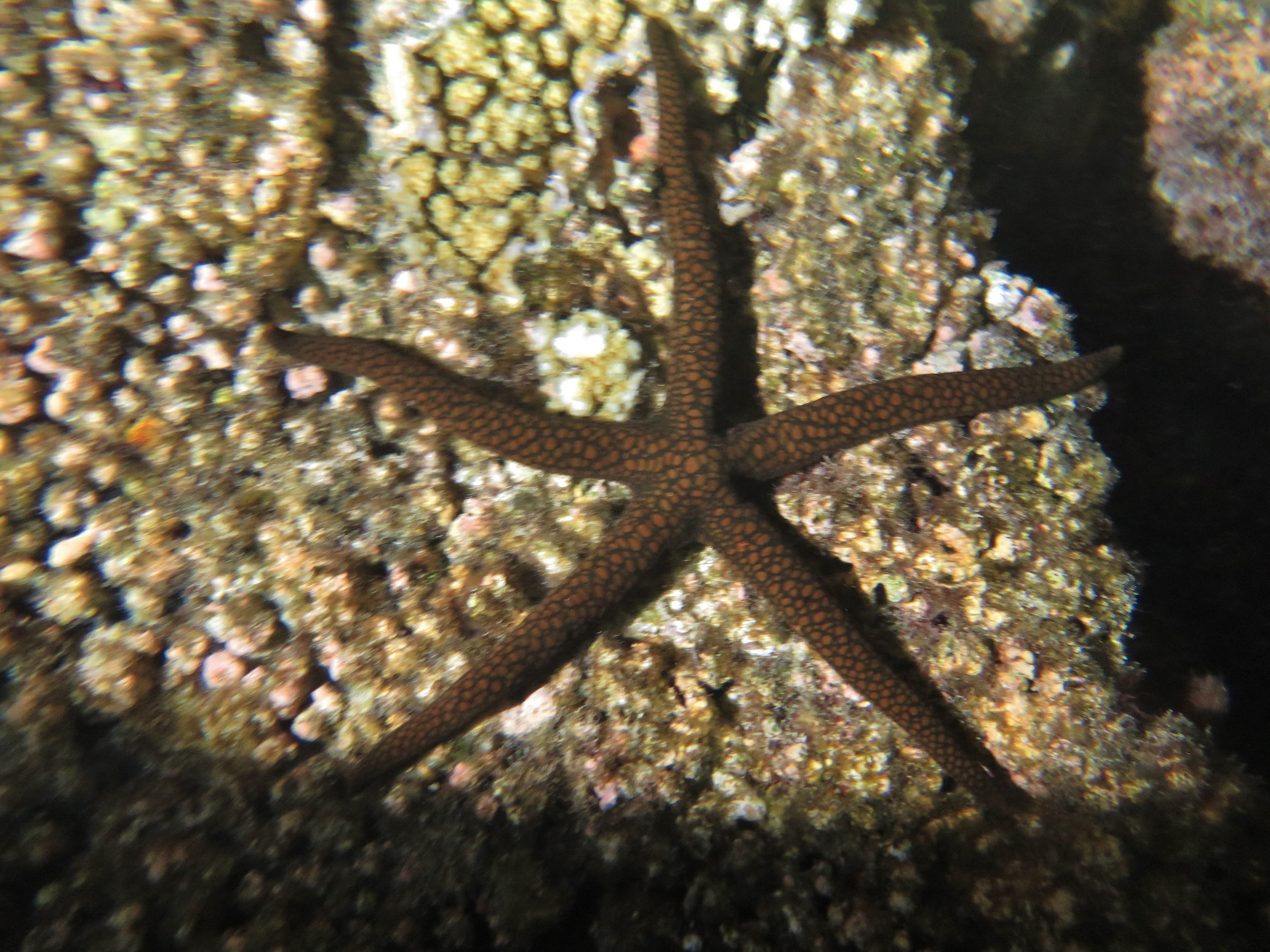

Scientific classification
- Kingdom: Animalia
- Phylum: Echinodermata
- Class: Asteroidea
- Order: Valvatida
- Family: Ophidiasteridae
- Genus: Nardoa
- Species: N. galatheae

Binomial name
- Nardoa galatheae Lütken, 1864

= Nardoa galatheae =

Species of starfish

Nardoa galatheae, commonly referred to as the brown mesh sea star, is a species of sea star in the family Ophidiasteridae that was first described in 1864 by Christian Frederik Lütken as Scytaster galatheae. It feeds mainly on detritus and small invertebrates. It is found in the Indo-Pacific region, in coral reefs and rocky substrates less than 30 m below the surface.

N. galatheae grows to an average of 25 centimetres (9.8 in).
