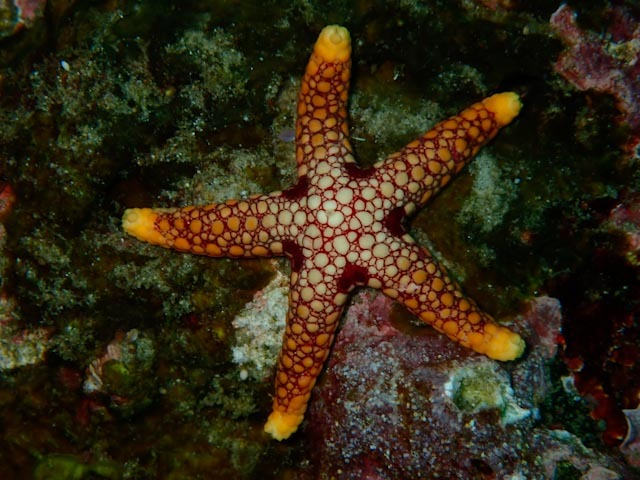

Scientific classification
- Kingdom: Animalia
- Phylum: Echinodermata
- Class: Asteroidea
- Order: Valvatida
- Family: Goniasteridae
- Genus: Ferdina
- Species: F. mena

Binomial name
- Ferdina mena Mah, 2017

= Ferdina mena =

Species of starfish

Ferdina mena, the false button star or red armpits sea star, is a species from the genus Ferdina.

== Characteristics ==
This species displays large rounded dorsal plates, white in the center and yellowing toward the tips of the arms, on a rust-colored background. It is particularly recognizable by the fact that the two plates located at each armpit are bright red.

== Distribution ==
This species appears to be endemic to the western Indian Ocean, where it is found from South Africa to Madagascar, including the Comoros and Mozambique.

It is replaced in the Mascarene Islands by Ferdina flavescens (single-colored), and south of Durban by Ferdina sadhaensis (with white plates on a red background).

== Taxonomy ==
The species' description is the result of a re-evaluation of Ophidiasteridae that led to the discovery of new genera and species supported by a distinctive set of characteristics that support a new subfamily, the Ferdininae, a group originally outlined by Marsh and Price (1991) within the Goniasteridae.
