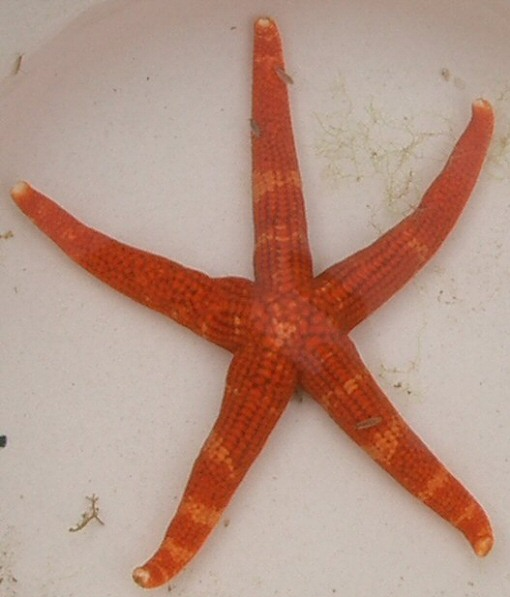
- Dorsal view of Certonardoa semiregularis

Scientific classification
- Kingdom: Animalia
- Phylum: Echinodermata
- Class: Asteroidea
- Order: Valvatida
- Family: Ophidiasteridae
- Genus: Certonardoa; H.L. Clark, 1921
- Species: C. semiregularis

Binomial name
- Certonardoa semiregularis (Muller & Troschel, 1842)

Synonyms
- Linckia semiregularis von Martens, 1866; Nardoa semiregularis Sladen, 1889; Scytaster semiregularis Müller & Troschel, 1842

= Certonardoa =

Species of starfish

Certonardoa semiregularis is a species of sea star in the family Ophidiasteridae. It is the only species in the genus Certonardoa.

== Description ==
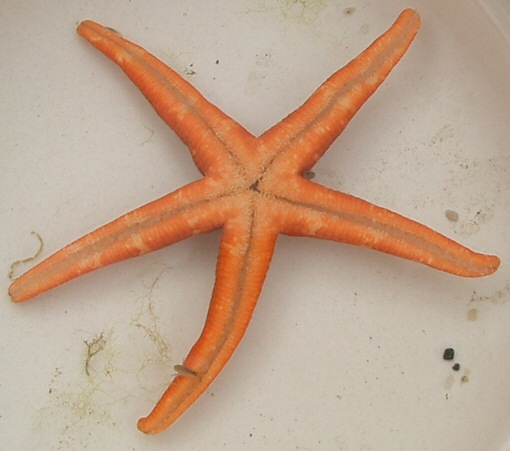
Ventral view

This species has five, slender, tapering arms. There are regular, longitudinal and transverse rows on the dorsal side. The ventral side is paler than the dorsal side.

== Distribution ==
This species is found in the East China Sea, in Japan, in particular, Honshu Island, Kyushu.
