= Andora (echinoderm) =

Scientific classification
- Kingdom: Animalia
- Phylum: Echinodermata
- Class: Asteroidea
- Order: Valvatida
- Family: Ophidiasteridae
- Genus: Andora; Clark, 1967

Genus of starfishes

Andora is a genus of starfish belonging to the family Ophidiasteridae.

The species of this genus are found in Malesia and Indian Ocean.

Species:

- Andora bruuni Rowe, 1977
- Andora faouzii (Macan, 1938)
- Andora popei Rowe, 1977
- Andora wilsoni Rowe, 1977
