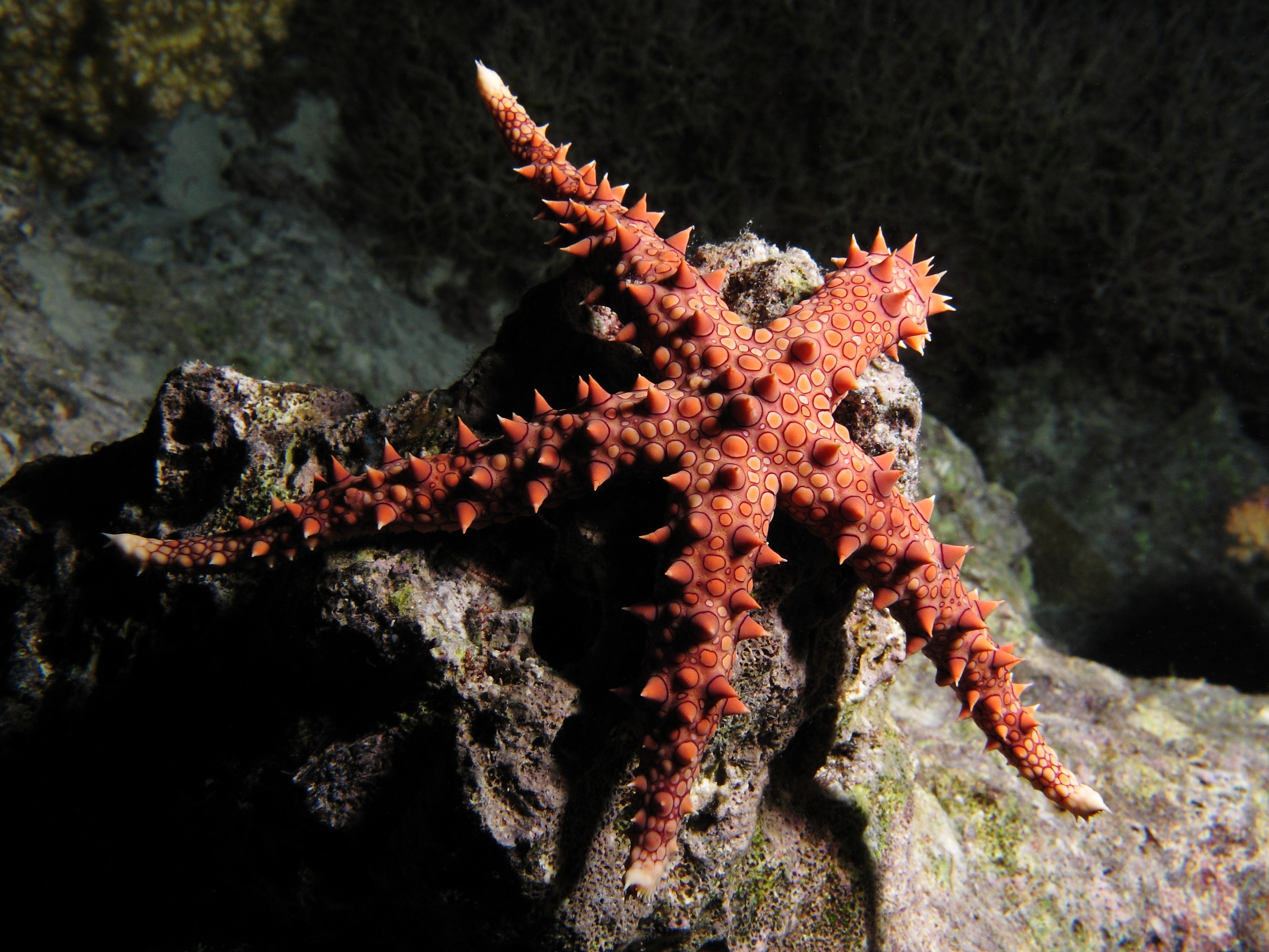

Scientific classification
- Domain: Eukaryota
- Kingdom: Animalia
- Phylum: Echinodermata
- Class: Asteroidea
- Order: Valvatida
- Family: Ophidiasteridae
- Genus: Gomophia
- Species: G. egyptiaca

Binomial name
- Gomophia egyptiaca Gray, 1840

= Gomophia egyptiaca =

Egyptian sea star

Species of sea star

Gomophia egyptiaca, sometimes called the Egyptian sea star, is a species of sea star from Ophidiasteridae family found throughout much of the Indo-Pacific.
