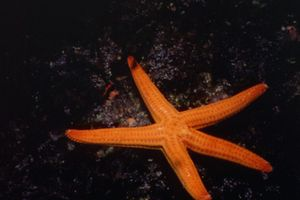

Scientific classification
- Domain: Eukaryota
- Kingdom: Animalia
- Phylum: Echinodermata
- Class: Asteroidea
- Order: Valvatida
- Family: Ophidiasteridae
- Genus: Hacelia
- Species: H. attenuata

Binomial name
- Hacelia attenuata Gray, 1840

= Hacelia attenuata =

Species of starfish

Hacelia attenuata is a species of sea star. The type species of the genus Hacelia, it was described by John Edward Gray in 1840. It is found in the Mediterranean Sea.
