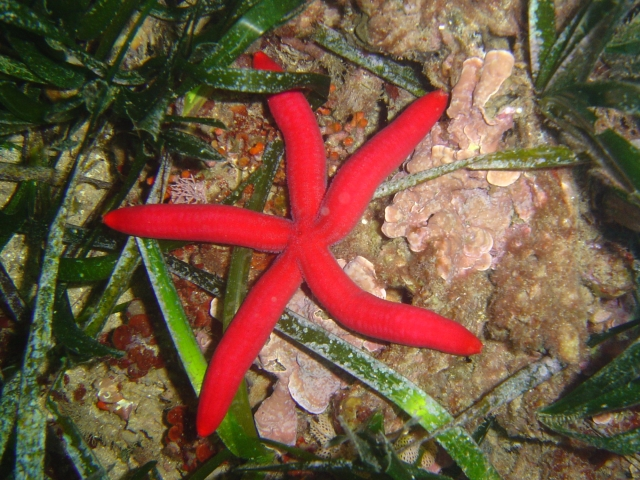

Scientific classification
- Kingdom: Animalia
- Phylum: Echinodermata
- Class: Asteroidea
- Order: Valvatida
- Family: Ophidiasteridae
- Genus: Ophidiaster
- Species: O. ophidianus

Binomial name
- Ophidiaster ophidianus Lamarck, 1816

Synonyms
- Asterias ophidiana Lamarck, 1816; Ophidiaster canariensis Greeff, 1872; Ophidiaster aurantius Gray, 1840

= Ophidiaster ophidianus =

Species of starfish

Ophidiaster ophidianus, the purple starfish, is a species of starfish from the East Atlantic (from mainland Portugal and the Azores down to the Gulf of Guinea) and the Mediterranean Sea. It has a big variation in colour (from red to orange) and may present brown spots. The central disc is small, covered by irregular plates, and the arms are thinner near the central disc. Each arm has lines of respiratory papillae. It can reach 40 cm in diameter.
