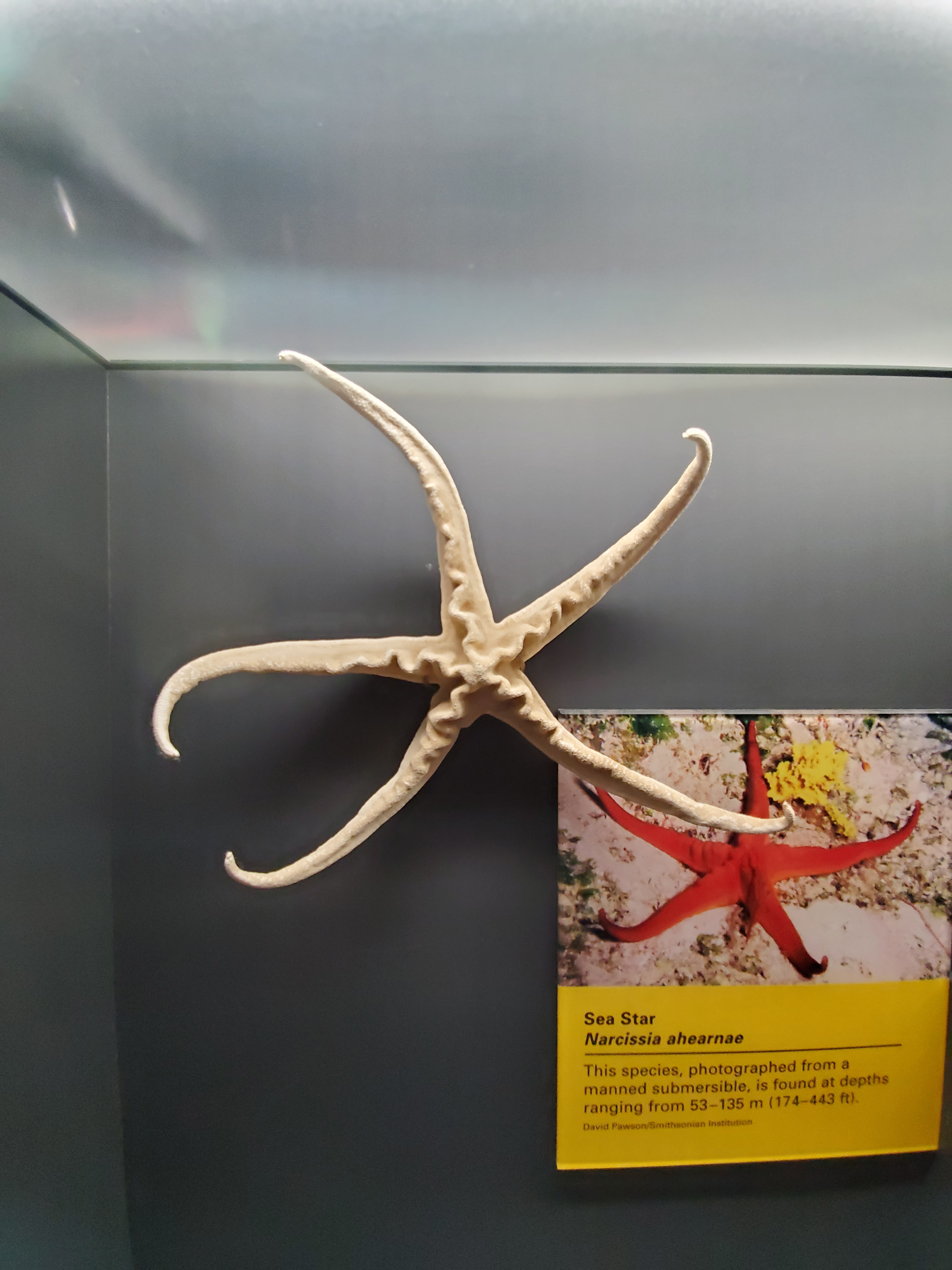
- Narcissia ahearnae

Scientific classification
- Kingdom: Animalia
- Phylum: Echinodermata
- Class: Asteroidea
- Order: Valvatida
- Family: Ophidiasteridae
- Genus: Narcissia; Gray, 1840

= Narcissia =

Genus of starfishes

Narcissia is a genus of echinoderms belonging to the family Ophidiasteridae.

The species of this genus are found in Africa and America.

Species:

- Narcissia ahearnae Pawson, 2007
- Narcissia canariensis (d'Orbigny, 1839)
- Narcissia gracilis A.H. Clark, 1916
- Narcissia trigonaria Sladen, 1889
