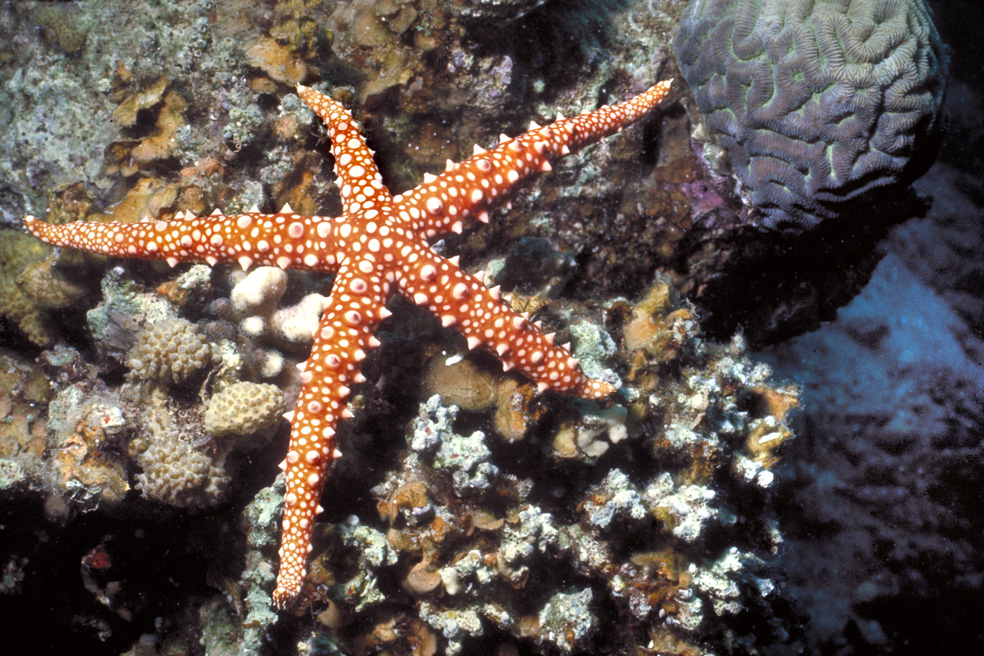
- Gomophia egyptiaca at the Red Sea

Scientific classification
- Kingdom: Animalia
- Phylum: Echinodermata
- Class: Asteroidea
- Order: Valvatida
- Family: Ophidiasteridae
- Genus: Gomophia

Species
- See Text.

= Gomophia =

Genus of starfishes

Gomophia is a genus of sea stars.

== List of species ==
These species are accepted in the World Register of Marine Species:

- Gomophia egeriae A. M. Clark, 1967
- Gomophia egyptiaca Gray, 1840
- Gomophia sphenisci (A.M. Clark, 1967)
- Gomophia watsoni (Livingstone, 1936)

SeaLife Base has a different taxonomy :

- Gomophia egyptiaca Gray, 1840
- Gomophia gomophia (Perrier, 1875)
- Gomophia mamillifera (Livingstone, 1930)
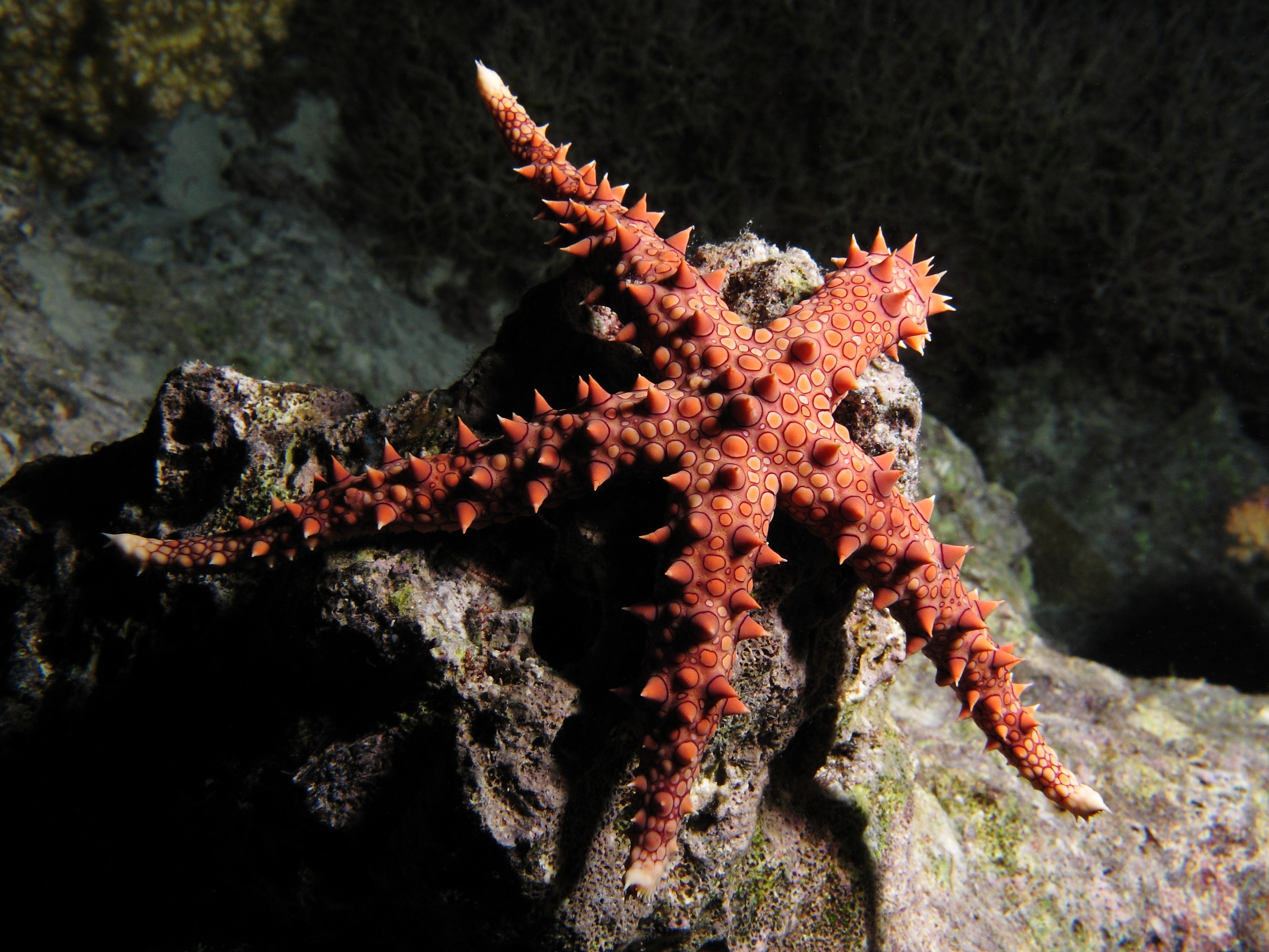
Gomophia egyptiaca

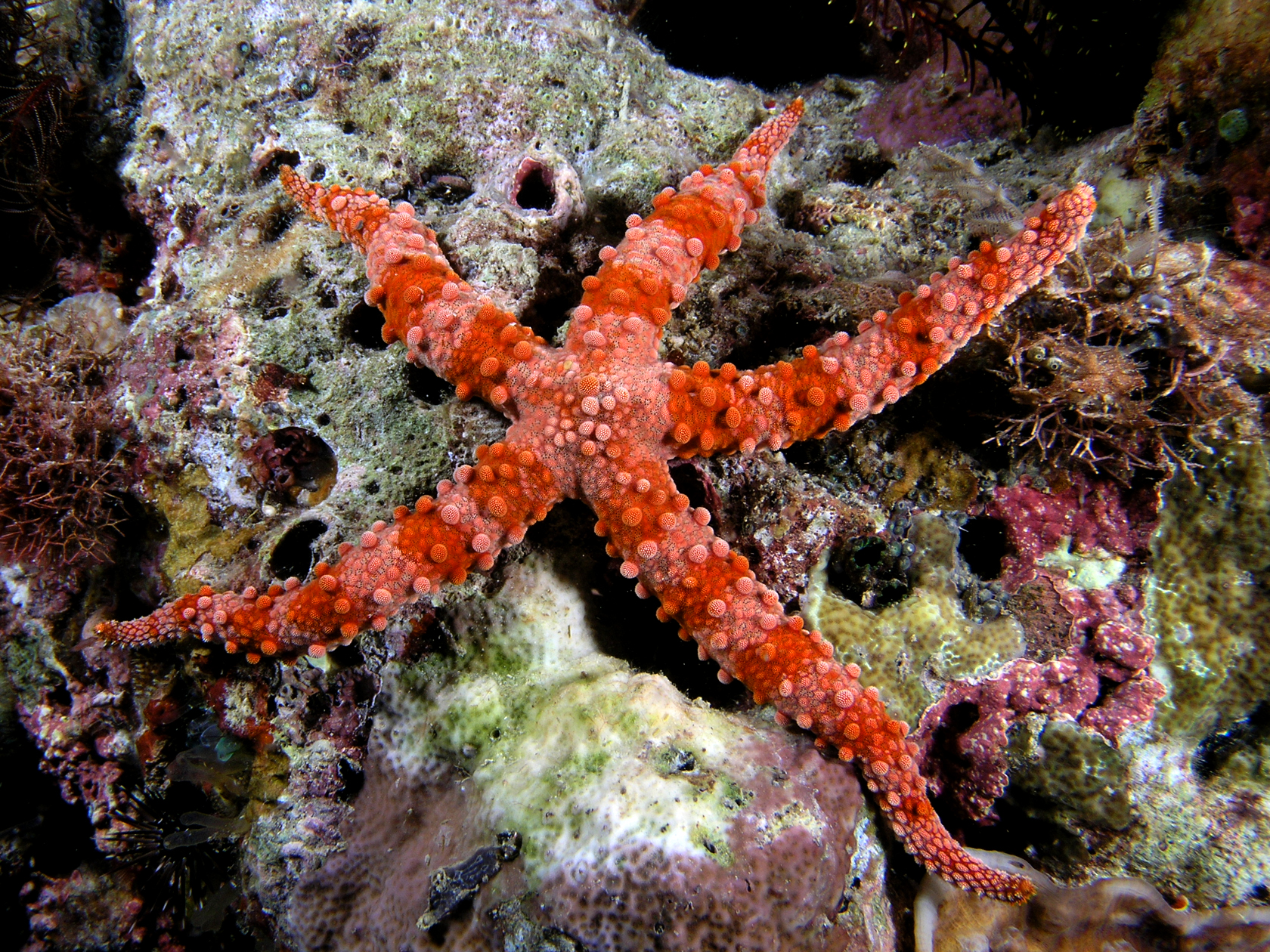
Gomophia gomophia
