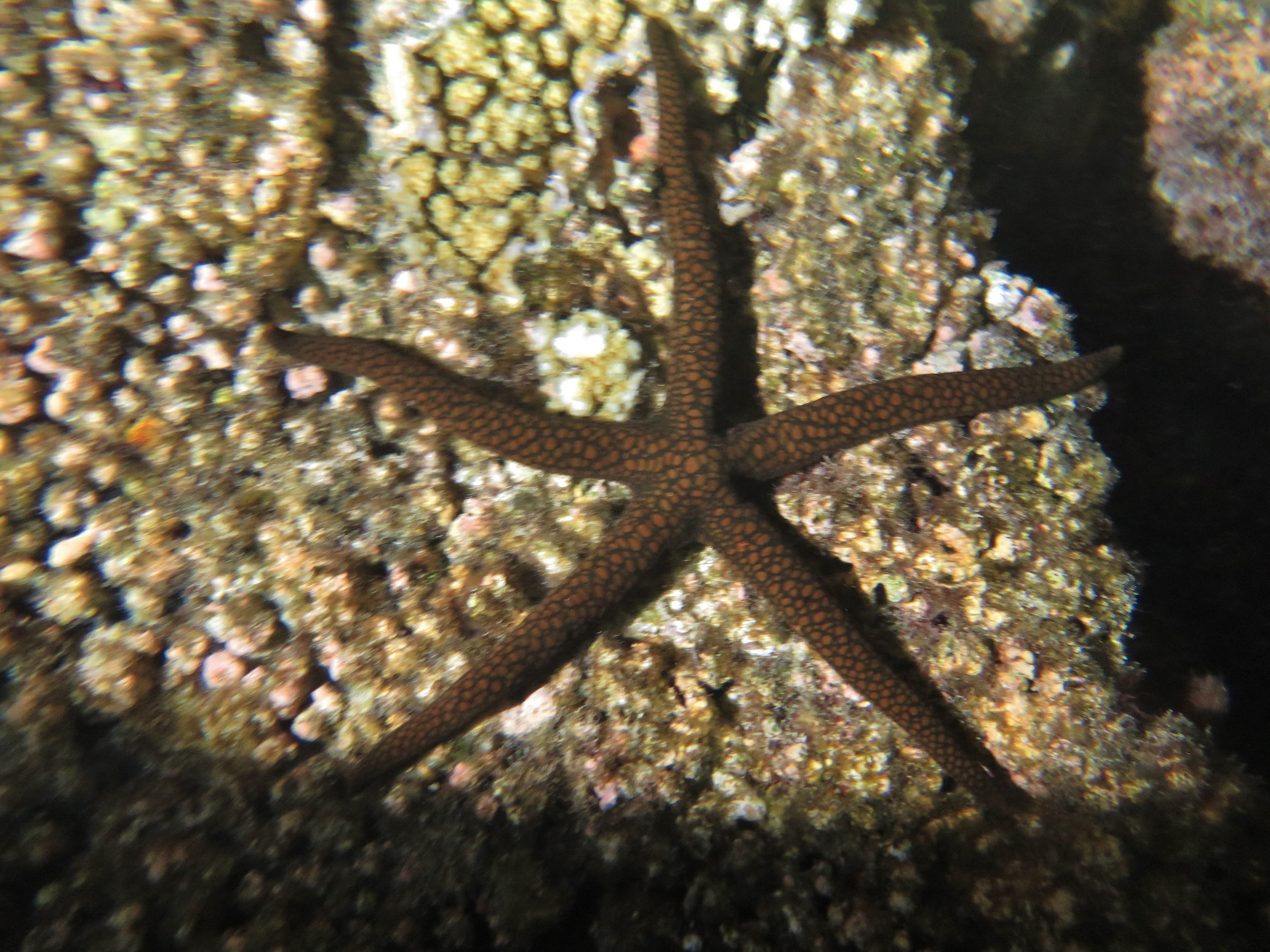
- Nardoa galatheae

Scientific classification
- Kingdom: Animalia
- Phylum: Echinodermata
- Class: Asteroidea
- Order: Valvatida
- Family: Ophidiasteridae
- Genus: Nardoa; J.E. Gray, 1840

= Nardoa =

Genus of starfishes

Nardoa is a genus of sea stars in the family Ophidiasteridae.

== Species ==
Species include:

- Nardoa frianti Koehler, 1910
- Nardoa galatheae (Lütken, 1864)
- Nardoa gomophia (Perrier, 1875)
- Nardoa mamillifera Livingstone, 1930
- Nardoa novaecaledoniae (Perrier, 1875)
- Nardoa rosea H.L. Clark, 1921
- Nardoa tuberculata Gray, 1840
- Nardoa tumulosa Fisher, 1917
- Nardoa variolata (Retzius, 1805)
