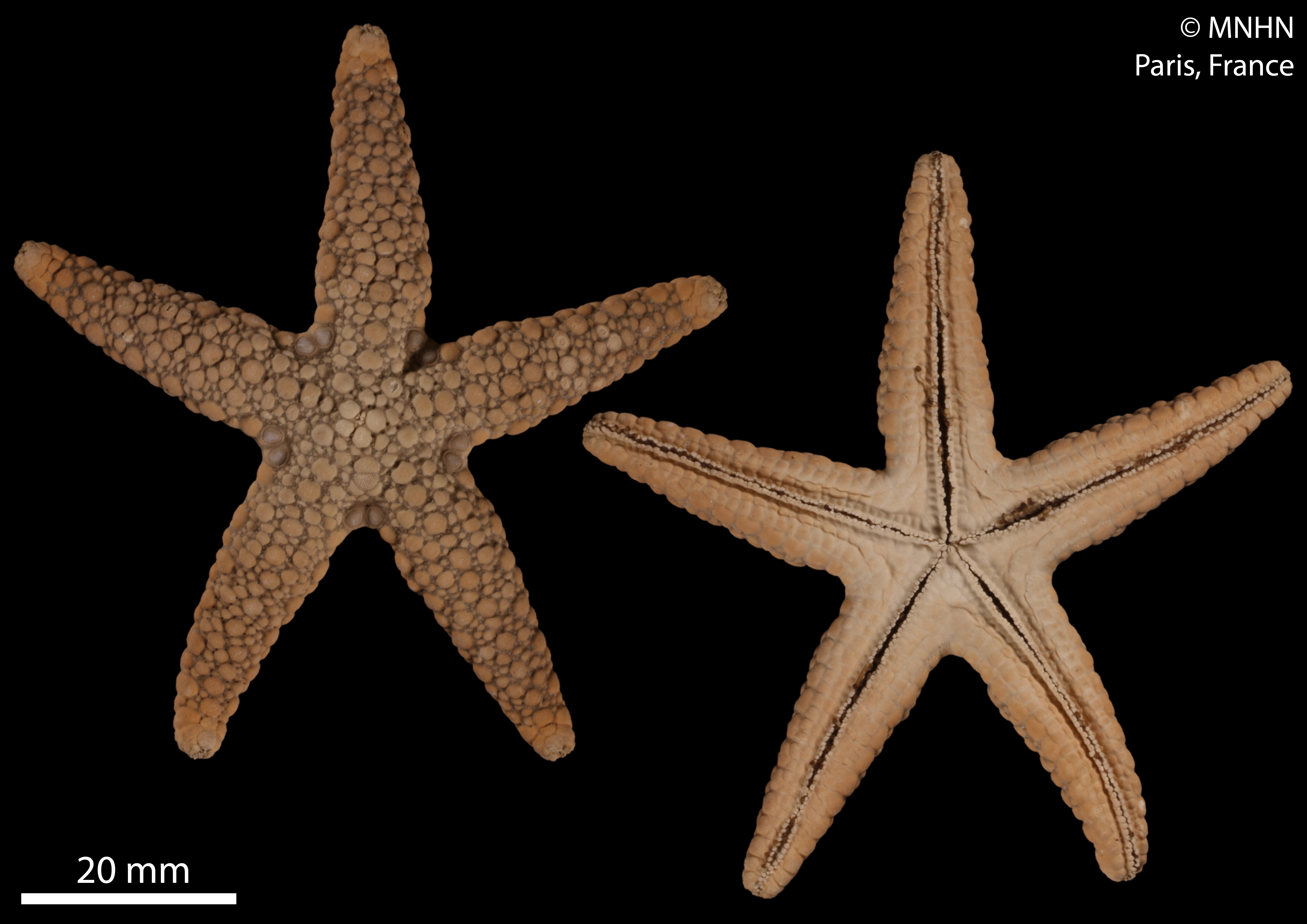
- Ferdina mena

Scientific classification
- Kingdom: Animalia
- Phylum: Echinodermata
- Class: Asteroidea
- Order: Valvatida
- Family: Goniasteridae
- Subfamily: Ferdininae
- Genus: Ferdina; Gray, 1840

= Ferdina =

Genus of starfishes

Ferdina is a genus of echinoderms belonging to the family Goniasteridae.

The species of this genus are found in the Indian ocean.

Species:

- Ferdina flavescens Gray, 1840 -- Mascarenes
- Ferdina mena Mah, 2017 -- Madagascar and western Indian ocean
- Ferdina sadhaensis Marsh & Campbell, 1991 -- Oman and whereabouts

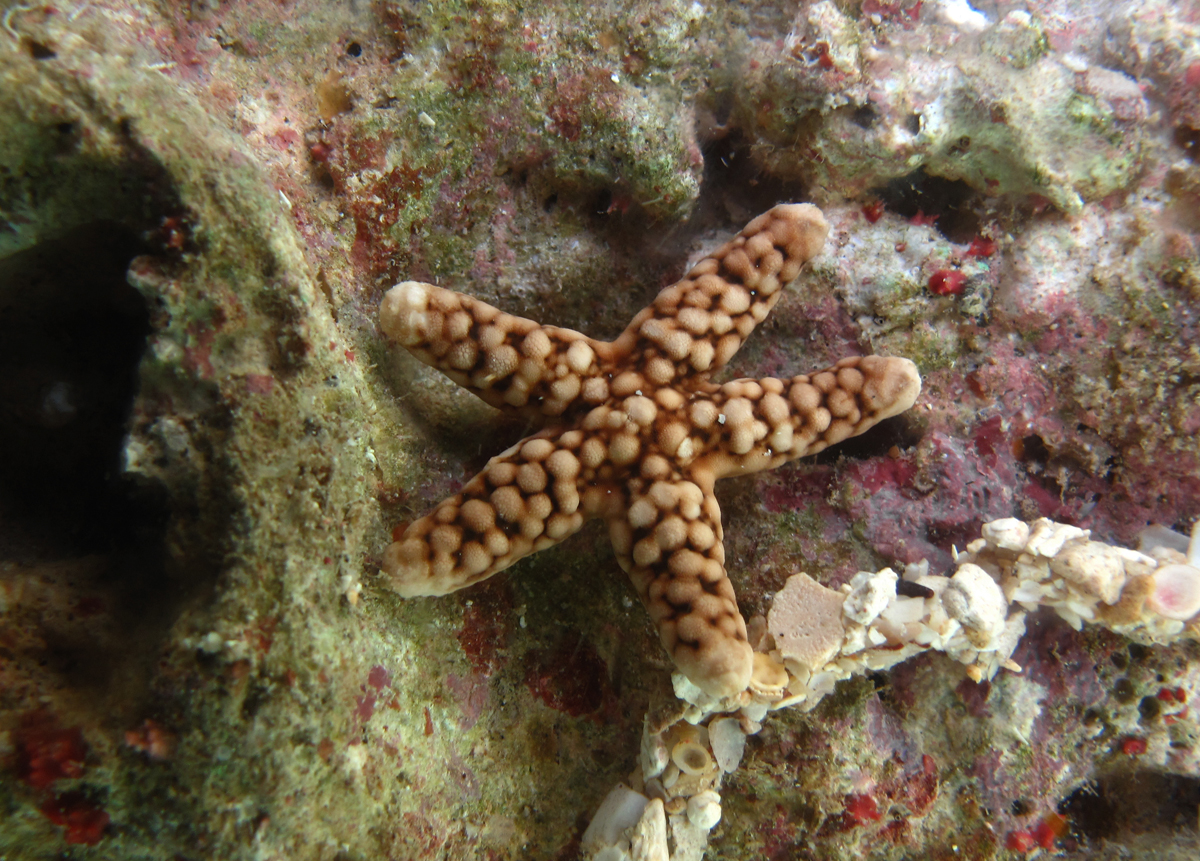
Ferdina flavescens

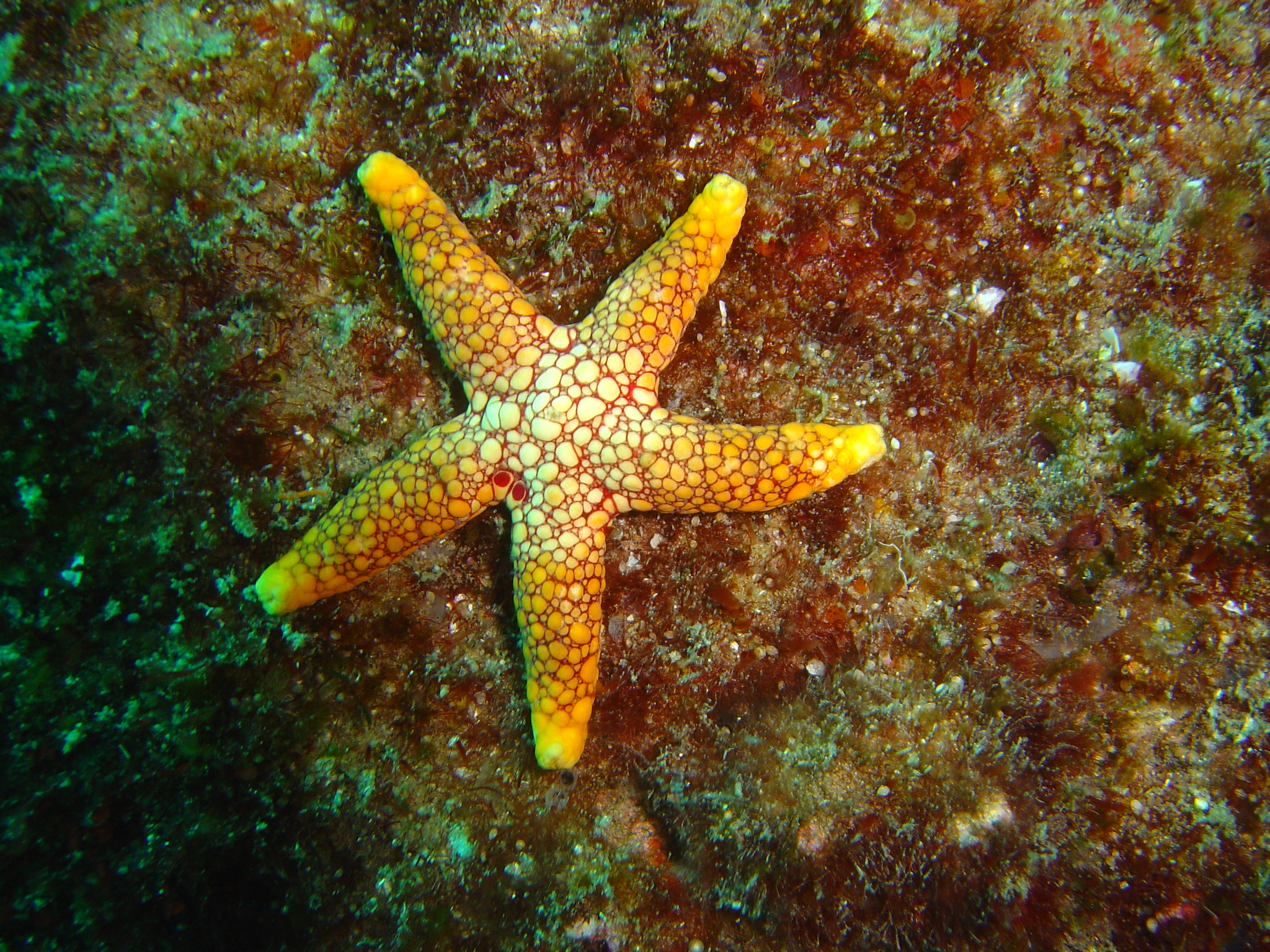
Ferdina mena
