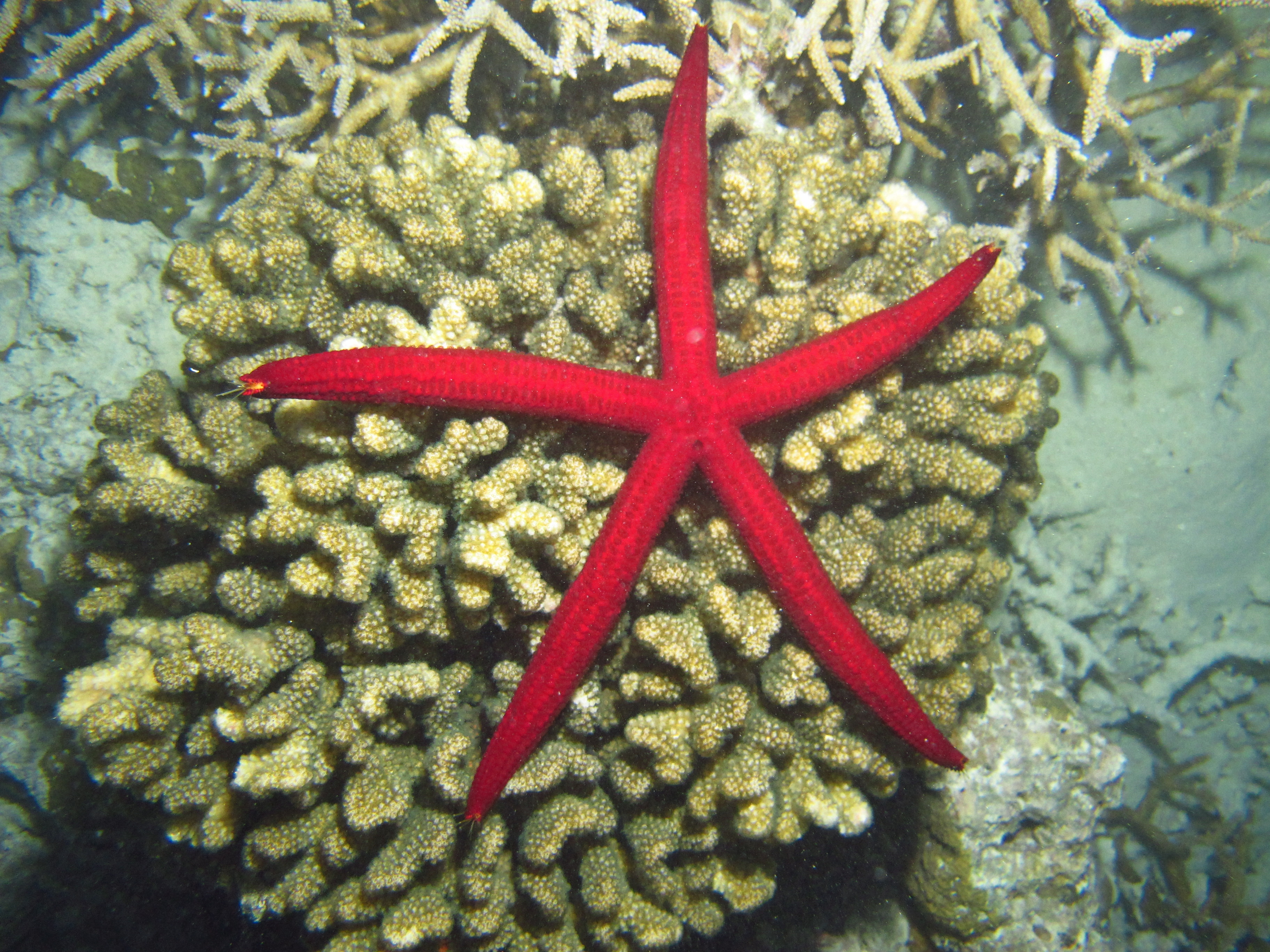
- Leiaster speciosus

Scientific classification
- Kingdom: Animalia
- Phylum: Echinodermata
- Class: Asteroidea
- Order: Valvatida
- Family: Ophidiasteridae
- Genus: Leiaster; Peters, 1852

= Leiaster =

Genus of starfishes

Leiaster is a genus of echinoderms belonging to the family Ophidiasteridae.

The genus has almost cosmopolitan distribution.

Species:

- Leiaster coriaceus Peters, 1852
- Leiaster glaber Peters, 1852
- Leiaster leachi (Gray, 1840)
- Leiaster speciosus von Martens, 1866
- Leiaster teres (Verrill, 1871)
