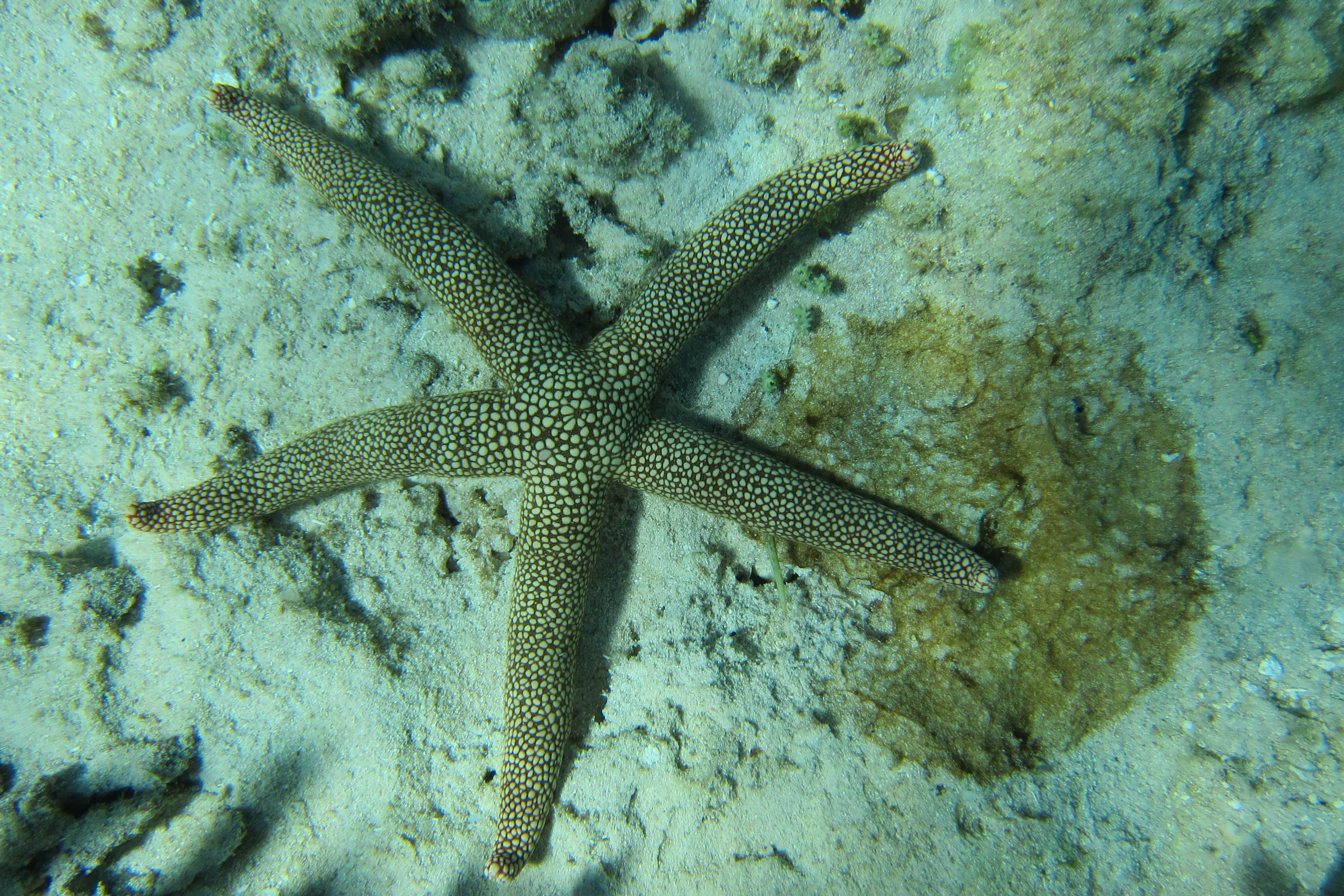

Scientific classification
- Kingdom: Animalia
- Phylum: Echinodermata
- Class: Asteroidea
- Order: Valvatida
- Family: Ophidiasteridae
- Genus: Nardoa
- Species: N. novaecaledoniae

Binomial name
- Nardoa novaecaledoniae Perrier, 1875

= Nardoa novaecaledoniae =

Species of star

Nardoa novaecaledoniae, commonly known as the yellow mesh sea star, is a species of sea star in the family Ophidiasteridae. It is found in the Western Central Pacific Ocean, the Philippines, and around New Caledonia at a depth range of 0-30 m. It is found in tropical reefs.

Nardoa novaecaledoniae grows to a maximum of 25 cm in length.
