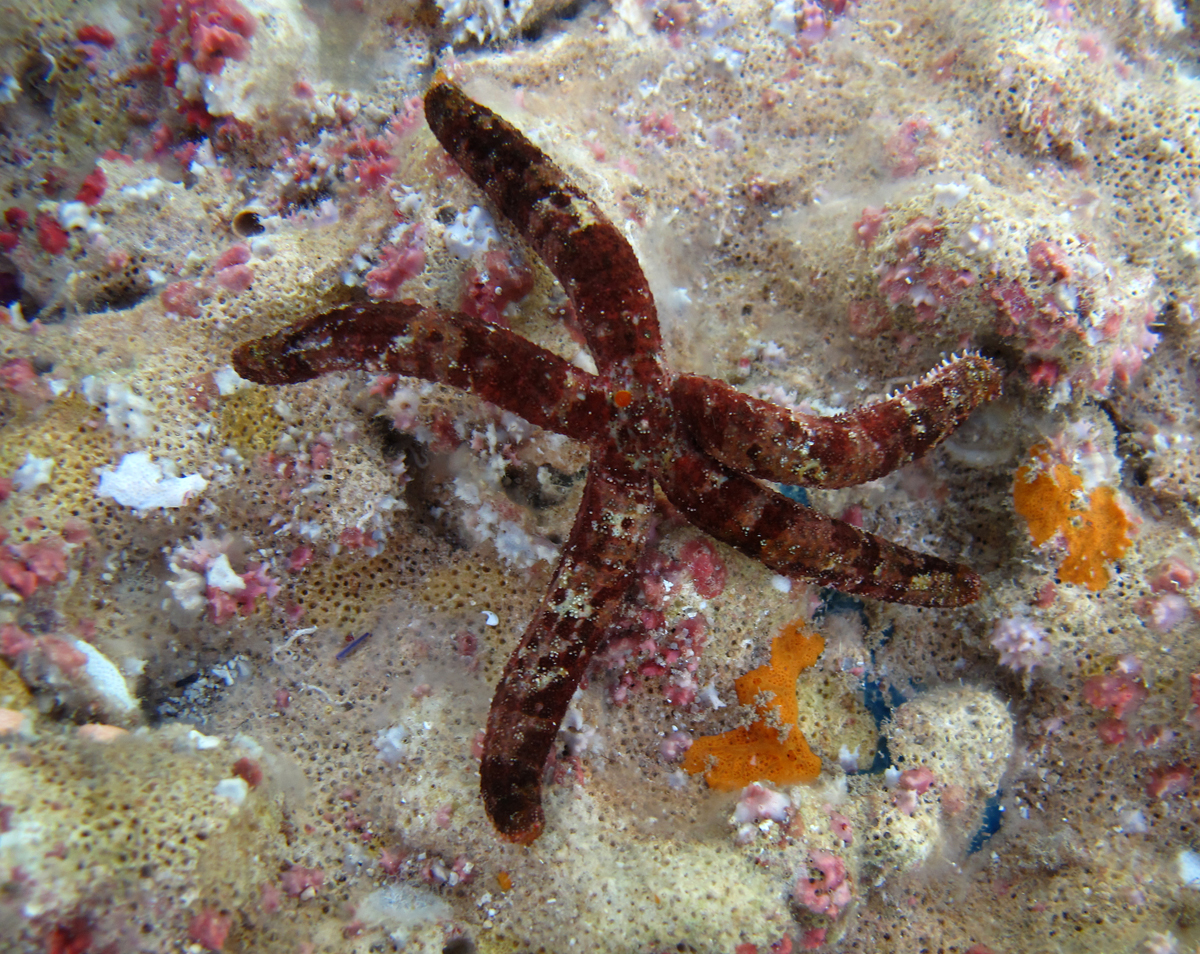
- Dactylosaster cylindricus

Scientific classification
- Kingdom: Animalia
- Phylum: Echinodermata
- Class: Asteroidea
- Order: Valvatida
- Family: Ophidiasteridae
- Genus: Dactylosaster; Gray, 1840

= Dactylosaster =

Genus of starfishes

Dactylosaster is a genus of echinoderms belonging to the family Ophidiasteridae.

The species of this genus are found in Indian and Pacific Ocean.

Species:

- Dactylosaster cylindricus (Lamarck, 1816)
- Dactylosaster gracilis Gray, 1840
