= Hacelia =

Scientific classification
- Kingdom: Animalia
- Phylum: Echinodermata
- Class: Asteroidea
- Order: Valvatida
- Family: Ophidiasteridae
- Genus: Hacelia; Gray, 1840

Genus of starfishes

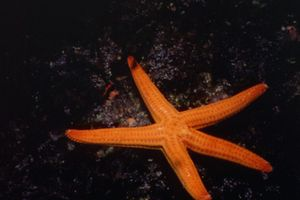

Hacelia is a genus of echinoderms belonging to the family Ophidiasteridae.

The genus has almost cosmopolitan distribution.

Species:

- Hacelia attenuata Gray, 1840
- Hacelia bozanici Hendler, 1996
- Hacelia capensis Mortensen, 1925
- Hacelia inarmata (Koehler, 1895)
- Hacelia raaraa Mah, 2021
- Hacelia superba H.L. Clark, 1921
- Hacelia tuberculata Liao, 1985
