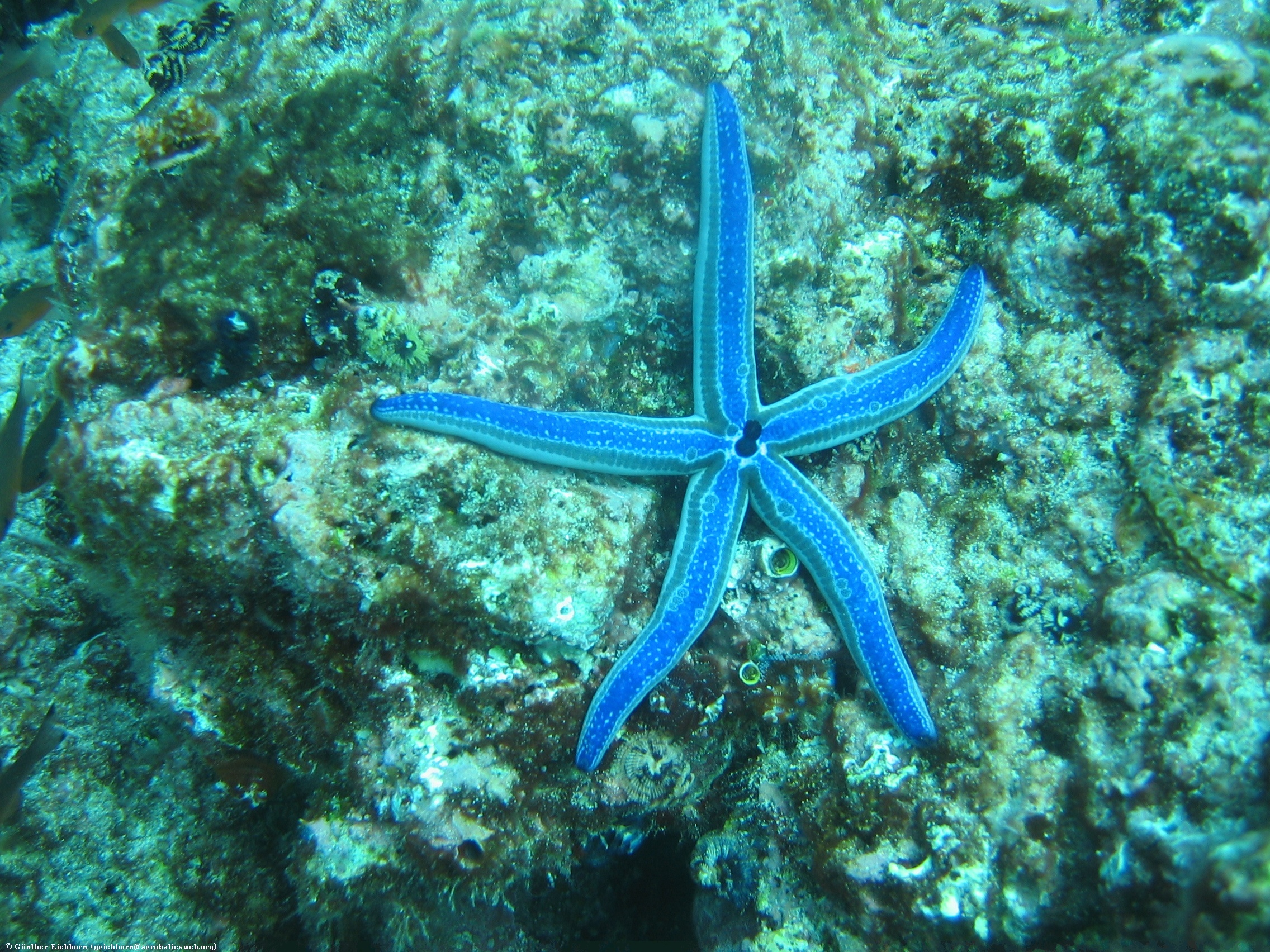
- Blue seastar (Phataria unifascialis)

Scientific classification
- Kingdom: Animalia
- Phylum: Echinodermata
- Class: Asteroidea
- Order: Valvatida
- Family: Ophidiasteridae
- Genus: Phataria (Gray, 1840)

Species
- See Text.

= Phataria =

Genus of starfishes

Phataria is a genus of sea stars in the family Ophidiasteridae from warmer parts of the East Pacific. P. unifascialis is relatively well-known and ranges from Baja California to northwest Peru, including offshore islands such as the Galápagos. The Ecuadorian P. mionactis is not well-known.

== Species ==
Species in this genus:

- Phataria mionactis (Ziesenhenne, 1942)
- Phataria unifascialis (Gray, 1840)
