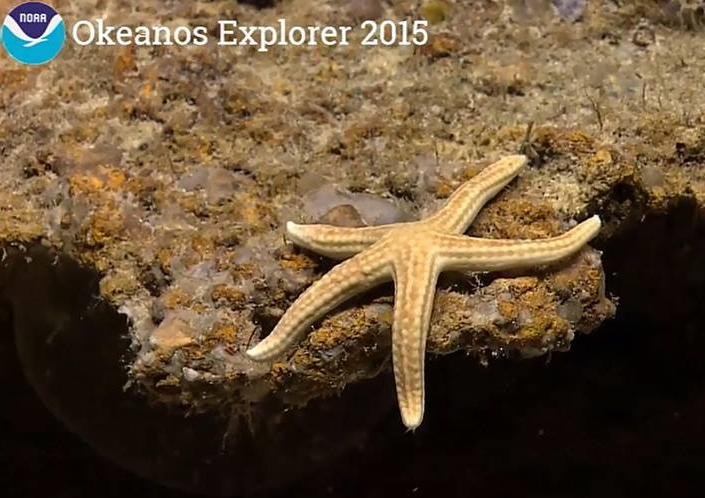
- Tamaria halperni

Scientific classification
- Kingdom: Animalia
- Phylum: Echinodermata
- Class: Asteroidea
- Order: Valvatida
- Family: Ophidiasteridae
- Genus: Tamaria; Gray, 1840

= Tamaria =

Genus of starfishes

Tamaria is a genus of echinoderms belonging to the family Ophidiasteridae.

The genus has almost cosmopolitan distribution.

Species:

- Tamaria dubiosa (Koehler, 1910)
- Tamaria floridae (Perrier, 1881)
- Tamaria fusca Gray, 1840
- Tamaria giffordensis McKnight, 2001
- Tamaria halperni Downey, 1971
- Tamaria hirsuta (Koehler, 1910)
- Tamaria lithosora H.L. Clark, 1921
- Tamaria marmorata (Michelin, 1844)
- Tamaria megaloplax (Bell, 1884)
- Tamaria obstipa Ziesenhenne, 1942
- Tamaria ornata (Koehler, 1910)
- Tamaria pusilla (Müller & Troschel, 1844)
- Tamaria scleroderma (Fisher, 1906)
- Tamaria tenella (Fisher, 1906)
- Tamaria triseriata (Fisher, 1906)
- Tamaria tumescens (Koehler, 1910)
