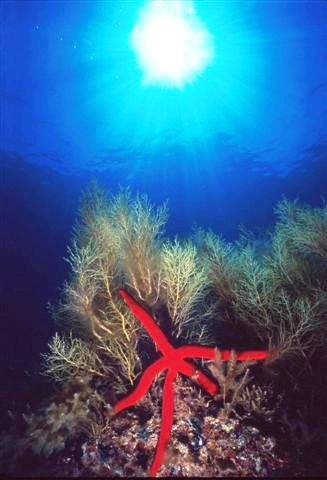
- Ophidiaster ophidianus

Scientific classification
- Kingdom: Animalia
- Phylum: Echinodermata
- Class: Asteroidea
- Order: Valvatida
- Family: Ophidiasteridae
- Genus: Ophidiaster; Agassiz, 1836

= Ophidiaster =

Genus of starfishes

Ophidiaster(from Ancient Greek ὄφις (óphis), meaning "snake", and ἀστήρ (astḗr), meaning "star") is a genus of sea stars belonging to the family Ophidiasteridae.

The genus has almost cosmopolitan distribution.

Species:

- Ophidiaster agassizi Perrier, 1881
- Ophidiaster alexandri Verrill, 1915
- Ophidiaster arenatus (Lamarck, 1816)
- Ophidiaster armatus Koehler, 1910
- Ophidiaster attenuatus Perrier, 1869
- Ophidiaster bayeri A.H. Clark, 1948
- Ophidiaster bicolor (Lamarck, 1816)
- Ophidiaster bullisi (Downey, 1970)
- Ophidiaster chinensis Perrier, 1875
- Ophidiaster colossus Mah, 2021
- Ophidiaster confertus H.L. Clark, 1916
- Ophidiaster cribrarius Lütken, 1871
- Ophidiaster davidsoni de Loriol & Pellat, 1874
- Ophidiaster duncani de Loriol, 1885
- Ophidiaster granifer Lütken, 1871
- Ophidiaster guildingi Gray, 1840
- Ophidiaster helicostichus Sladen, 1889
- Ophidiaster hemprichi Müller & Troschel, 1842
- Ophidiaster kermadecensis Benham, 1911
- Ophidiaster lorioli Fisher, 1906
- Ophidiaster ludwigi deLoriol, 1900
- Ophidiaster macknighti H.E.S.Clark, 1962
- Ophidiaster multispinus Liao & A.M.Clark, 1996
- Ophidiaster ophidianus (Lamarck, 1816)
- Ophidiaster perplexus A.H. Clark, 1954
- Ophidiaster perrieri de Loriol, 1885
- Ophidiaster reyssi Sibuet, 1977
- Ophidiaster rhabdotus Fisher, 1906
- Ophidiaster tuberifer Sladen, 1889

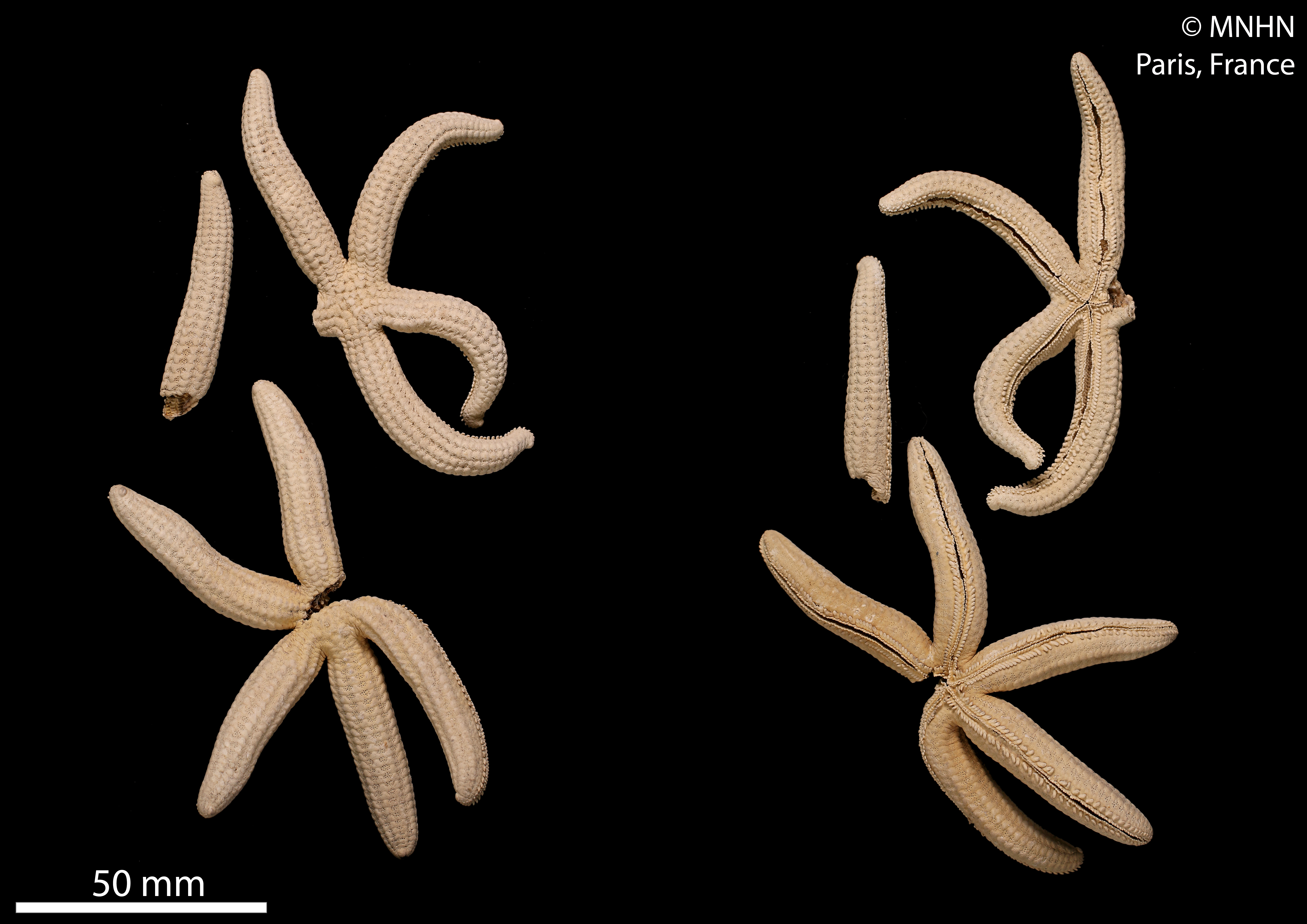
Ophidiaster chinensis (MNHN)

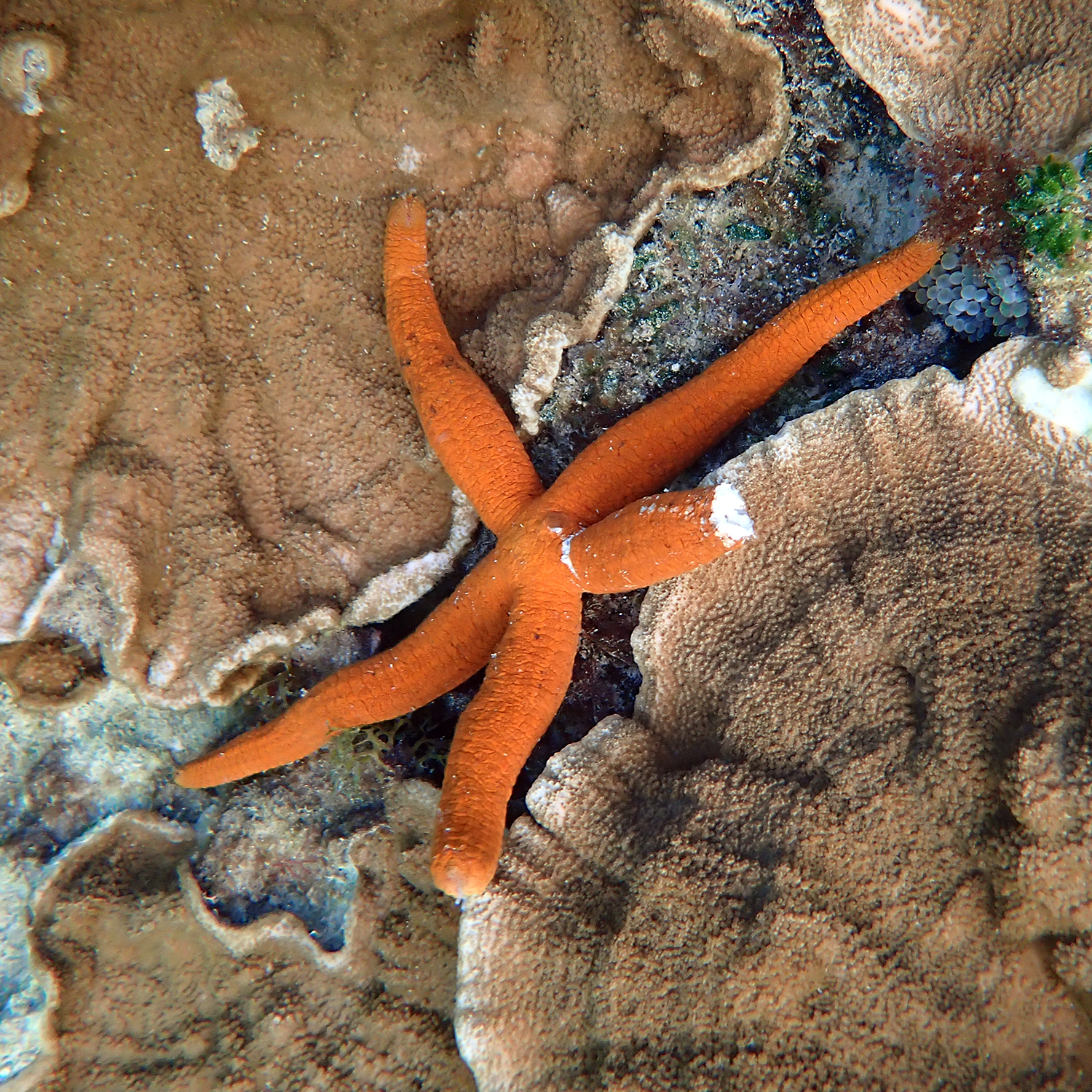
Ophidiaster confertus

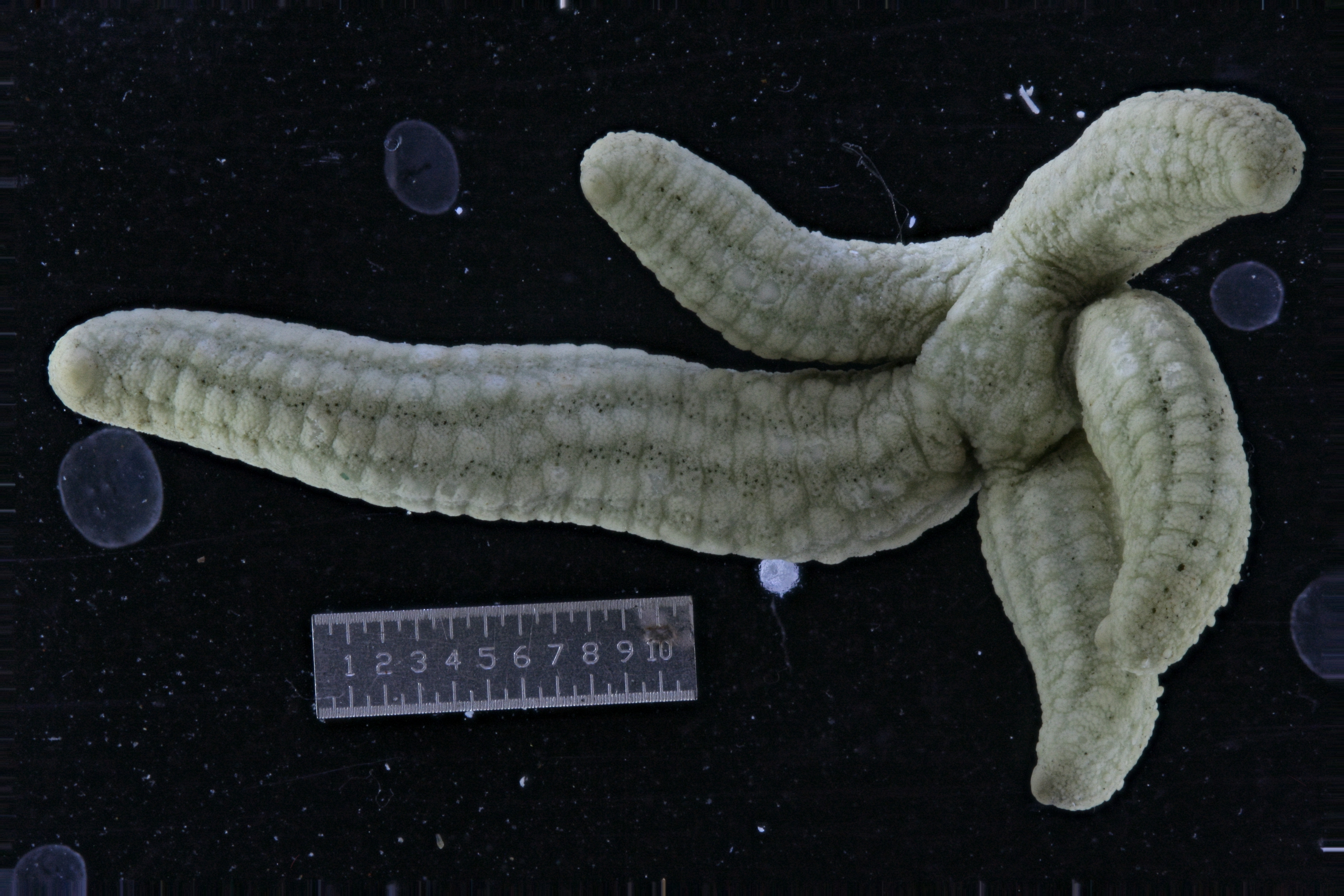
Ophidiaster cribrarius

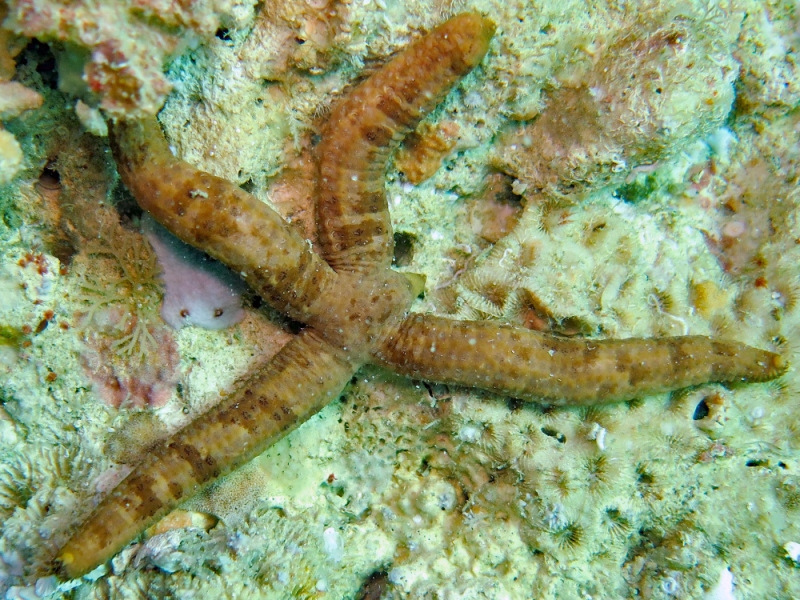
Ophidiaster duncani

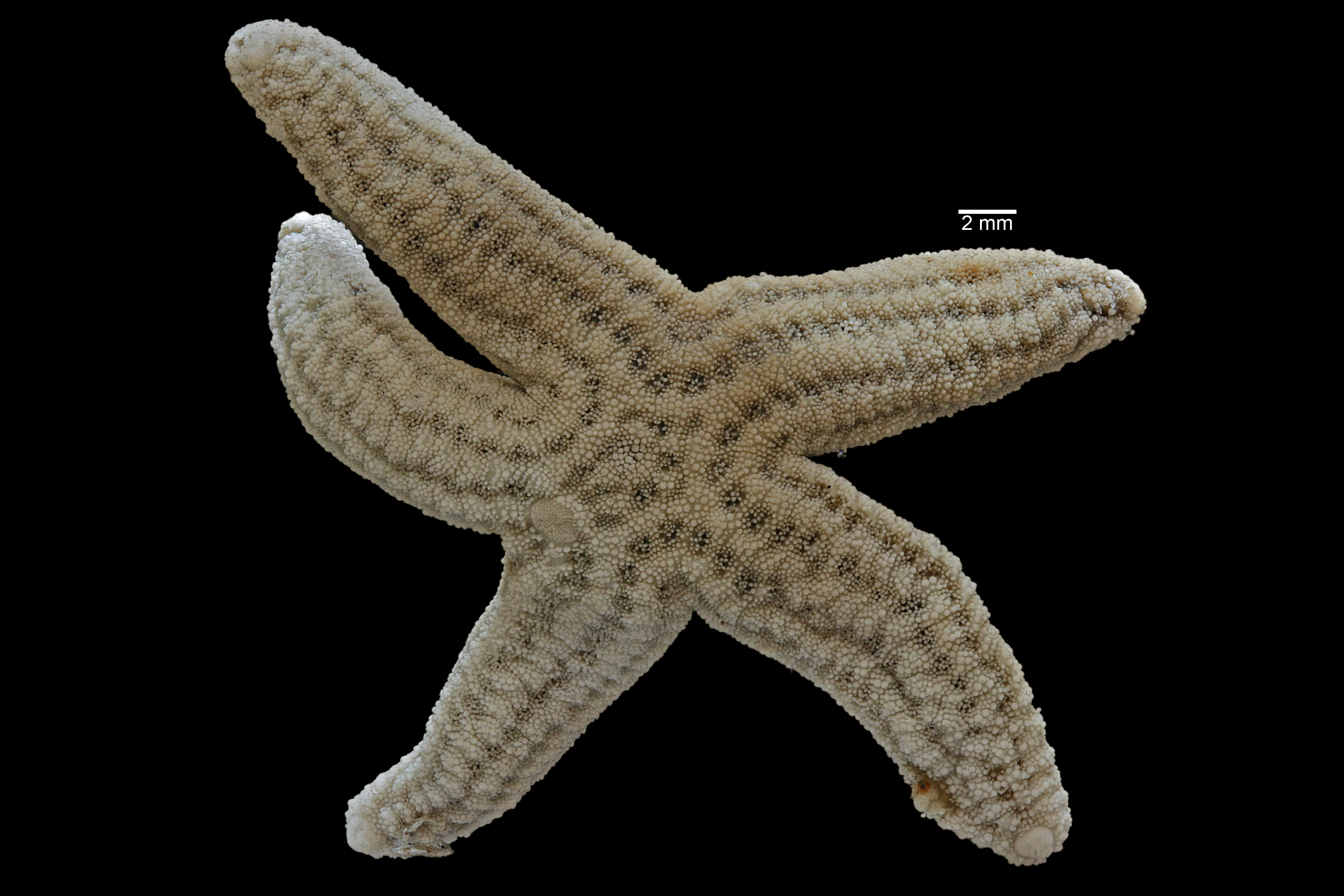
Ophidiaster granifer

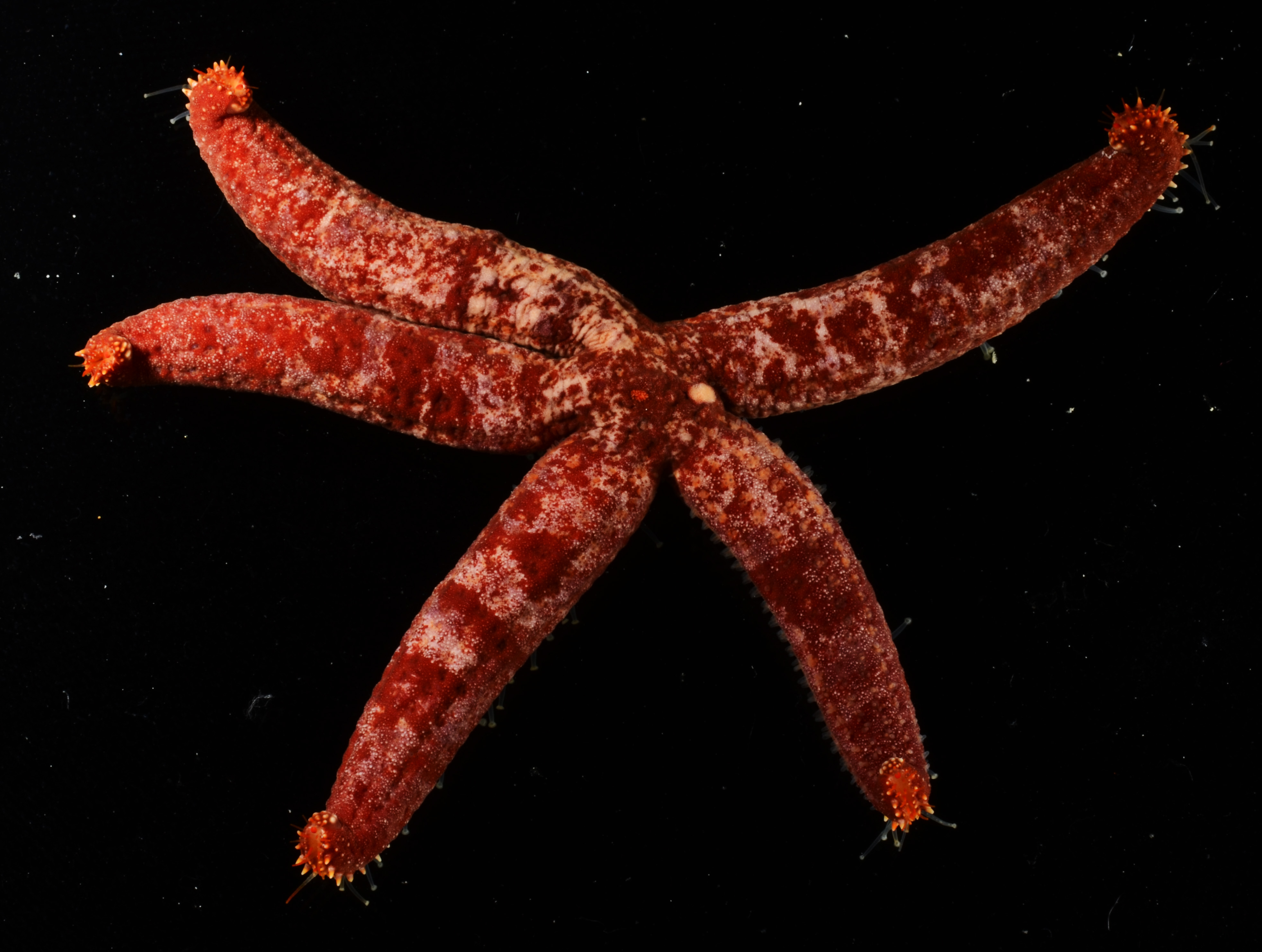
Ophidiaster guildingi

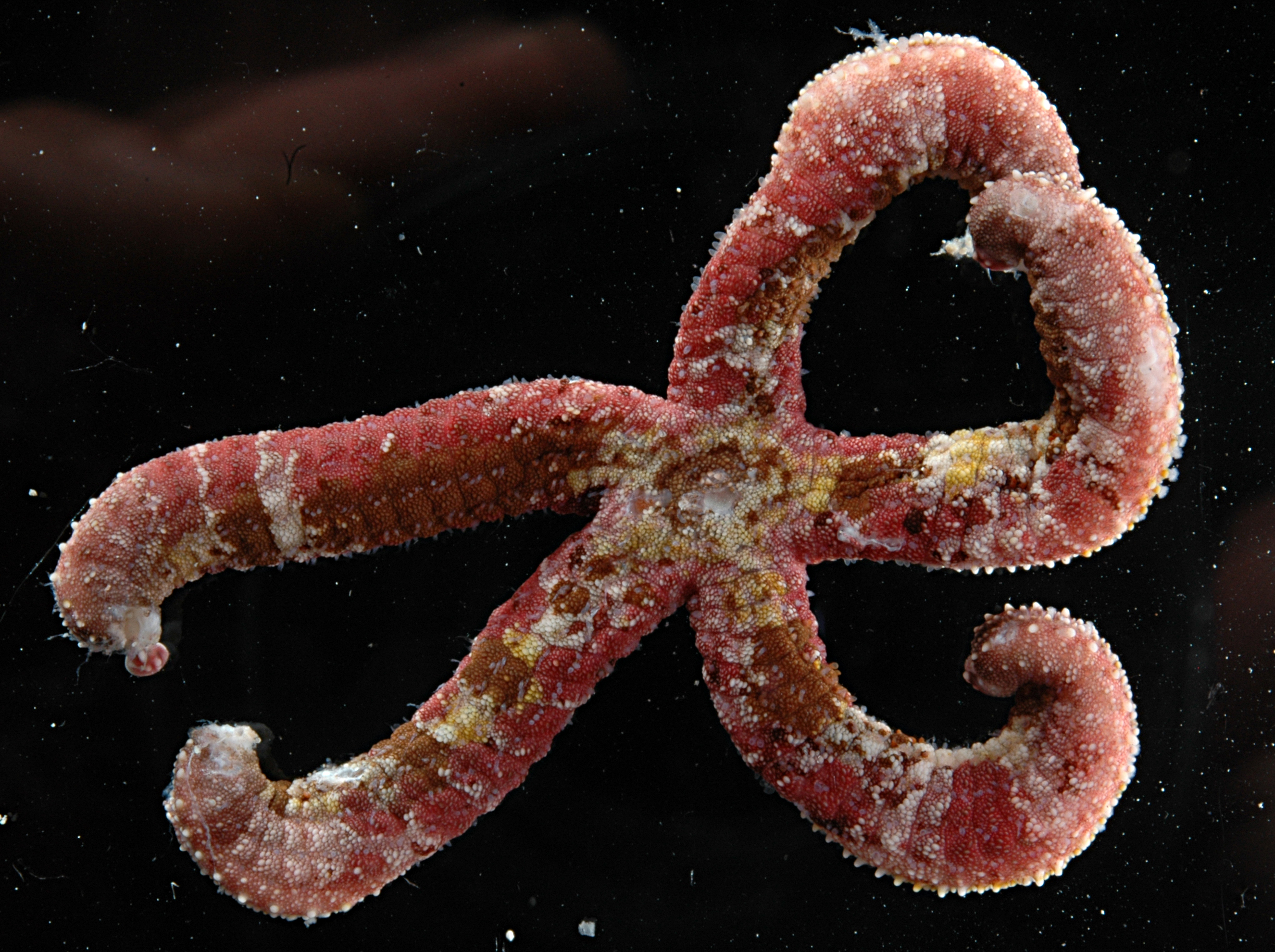
Ophidiaster hemprichi

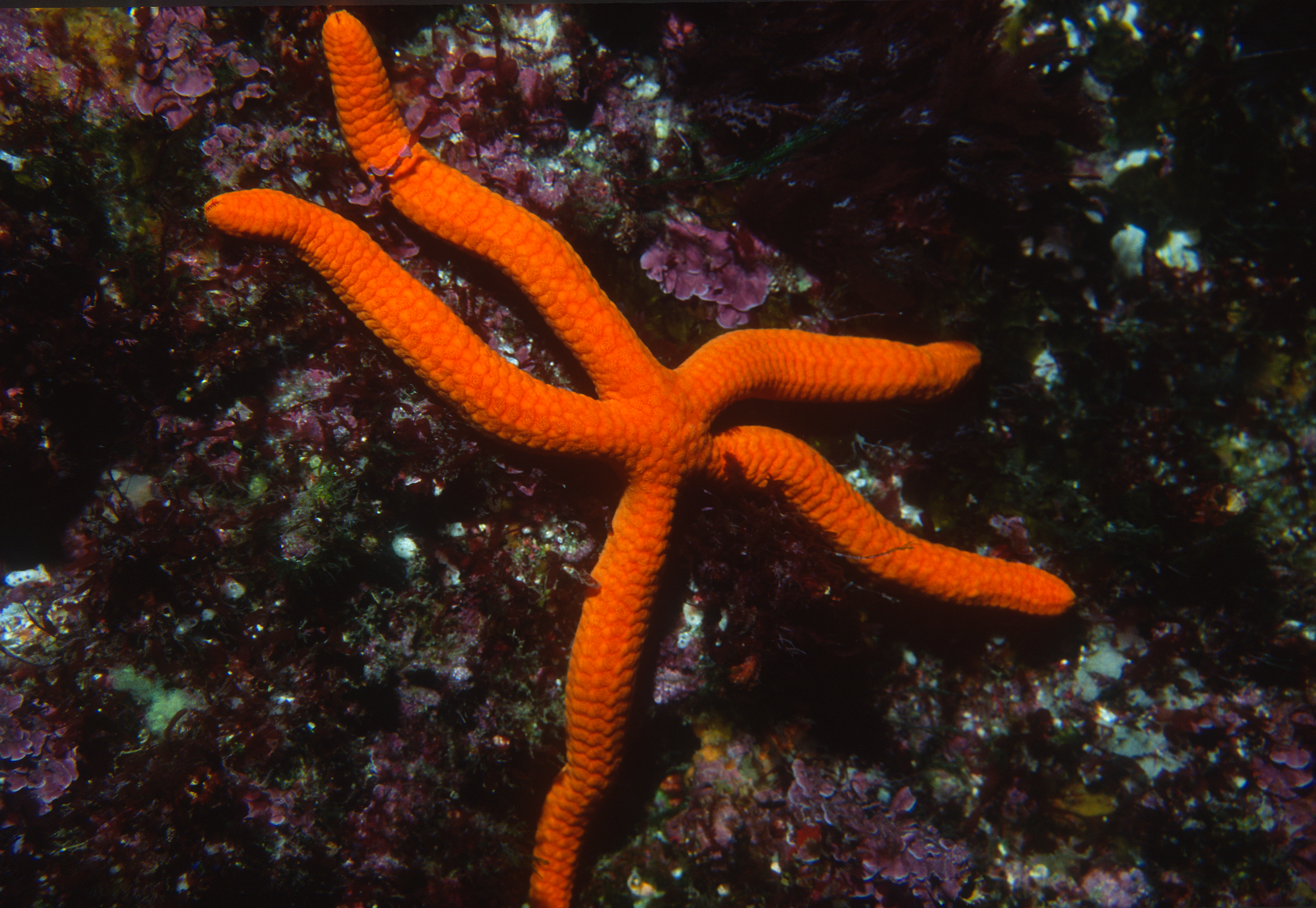
Ophidiaster kermadecensis

Ophidiaster macknighti

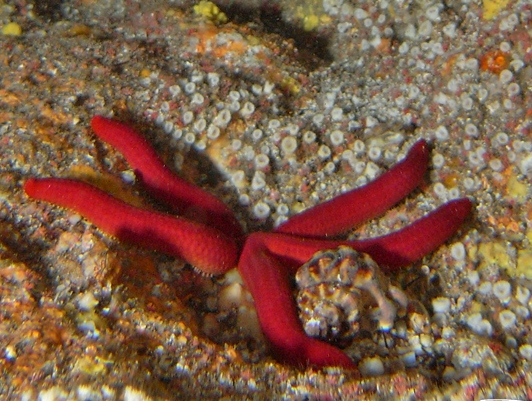
Ophidiaster ophidianus

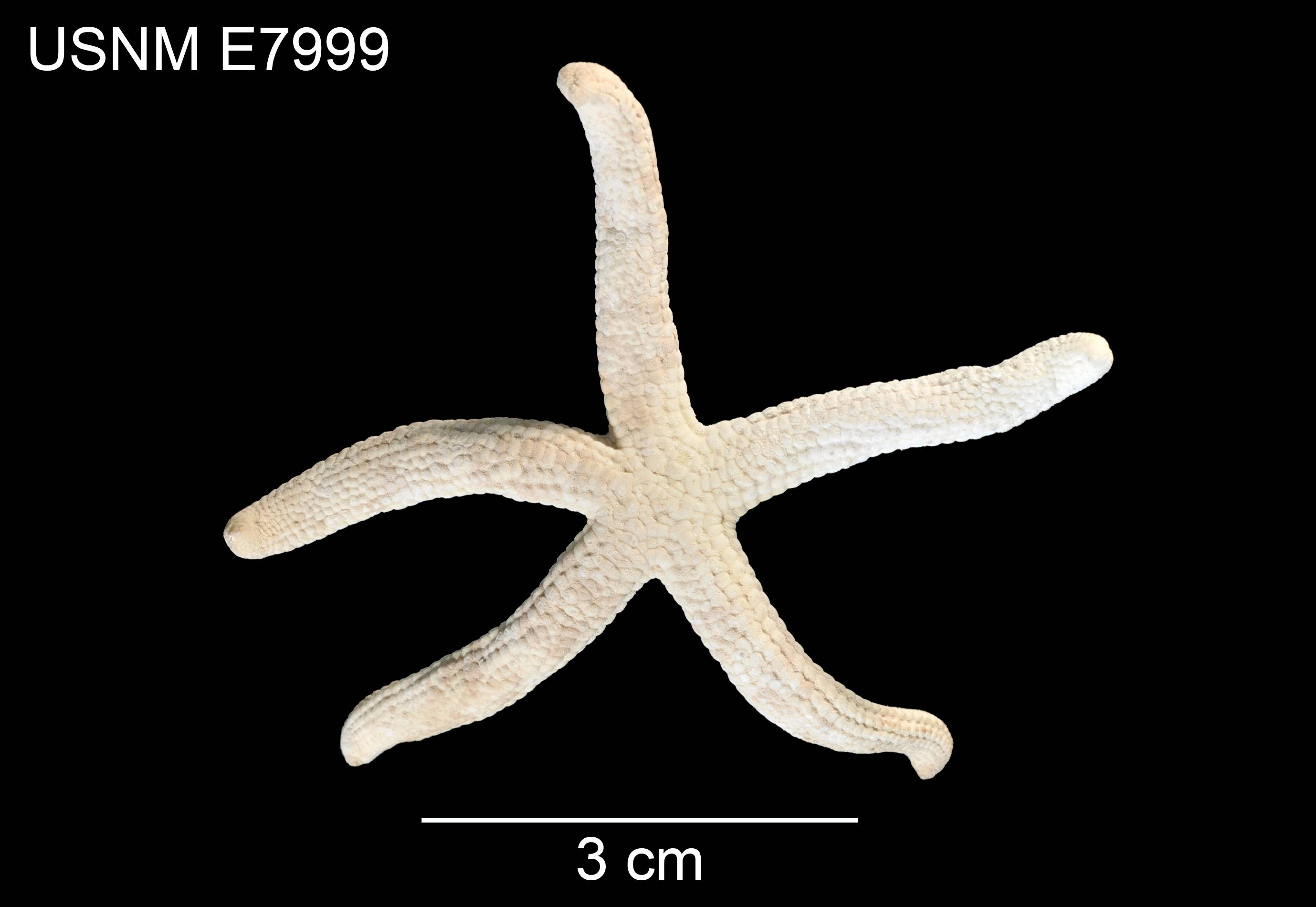
Ophidiaster perplexus

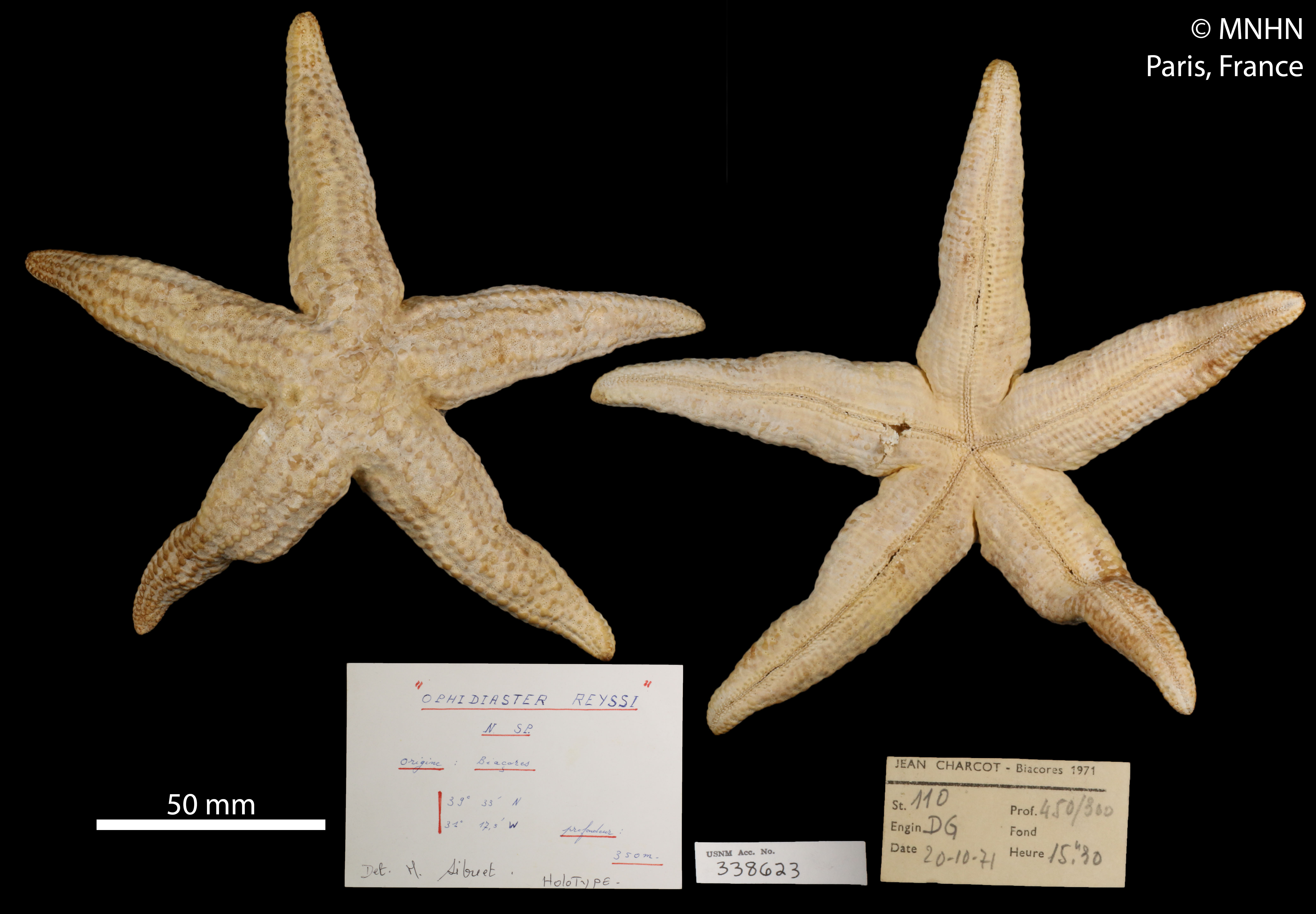
Ophidiaster reyssi (holotype, MNHN)
