= Nardoa rosea =

Scientific classification
- Kingdom: Animalia
- Phylum: Echinodermata
- Class: Asteroidea
- Order: Valvatida
- Family: Ophidiasteridae
- Genus: Nardoa
- Species: N. rosea

Binomial name
- Nardoa rosea H.L. Clark, 1921

Species of starfish

Nardoa rosea, the rose sea star, is a species of sea star of the family Ophidiasteridae. It is found in Western Australia.
