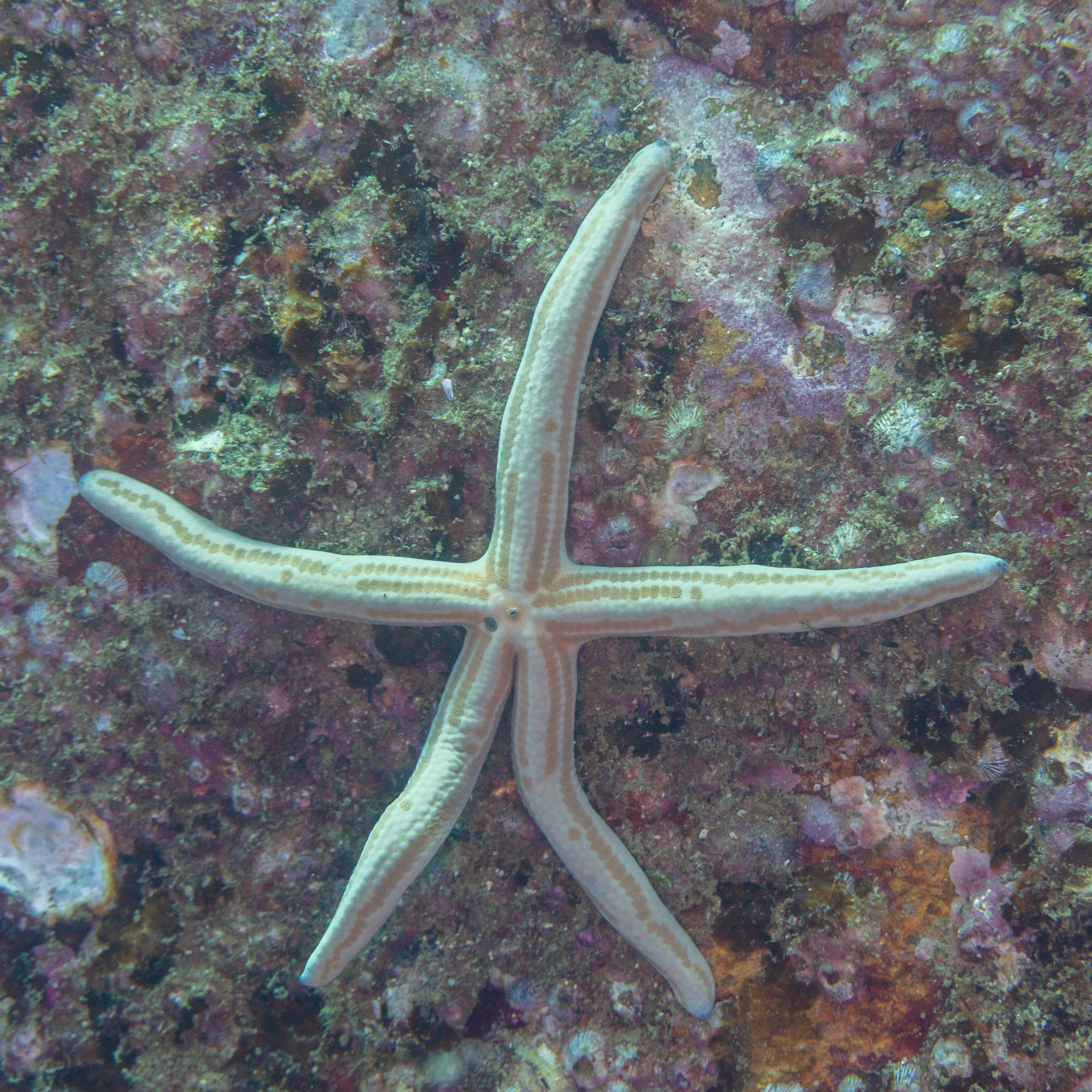
- Found in Baja California (Mexico)

Scientific classification
- Kingdom: Animalia
- Phylum: Echinodermata
- Class: Asteroidea
- Order: Valvatida
- Family: Ophidiasteridae
- Genus: Phataria
- Species: P. unifascialis

Binomial name
- Phataria unifascialis (Gray, 1840)

Synonyms
- Linckia unifascialis Gray, 1840; Linckia bifascialis Gray, 1840; Linckia unifascialis Gray, 1840; Ophidiaster suturalis Müller & Troschel, 1842; Phataria bifascialis (Gray, 1840)

= Phataria unifascialis =

Species of starfish

Phataria unifascialis is a species of starfish in the family Ophidiasteridae. It is sometimes known as the blue seastar or tan starfish, but both these names are also used for other species (e.g., blue seastar for Linckia laevigata). It is native to the eastern Pacific Ocean where it ranges from the Gulf of California and Magdalena Bay (Mexico) to northwest Peru, including various eastern Pacific island groups such as the Galápagos. It remains fully active at temperatures down to 17 °C (63 °F), but becomes inactive when it drops to 14 °C (57 °F). It reaches a diameter of about 30 cm (1 ft).

== Distribution in Panama ==
In Panama this species has been collected from Monte Island (USNM E 11842), Pearl Islands Archipelago (USNM E 7595) and Taboga Island (USNM 39144), Taboguilla Island (USNM E 11832, depth 12 m), Culebra Island (USNM E 37379, USNM E 37377; Centroid Latitude: 8.9133, Centroid Longitude: -79.5317), Venado Island (USNM E 37376; Centroid Latitude: 8.8792, Centroid Longitude: -79.59583), Perico Island (USNM E 35150), Gulf of Panama, eastern Pacific.
