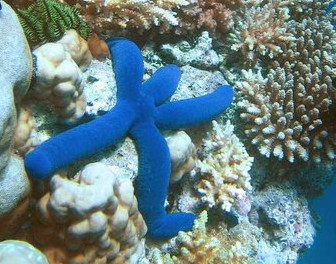
- Linckia laevigata
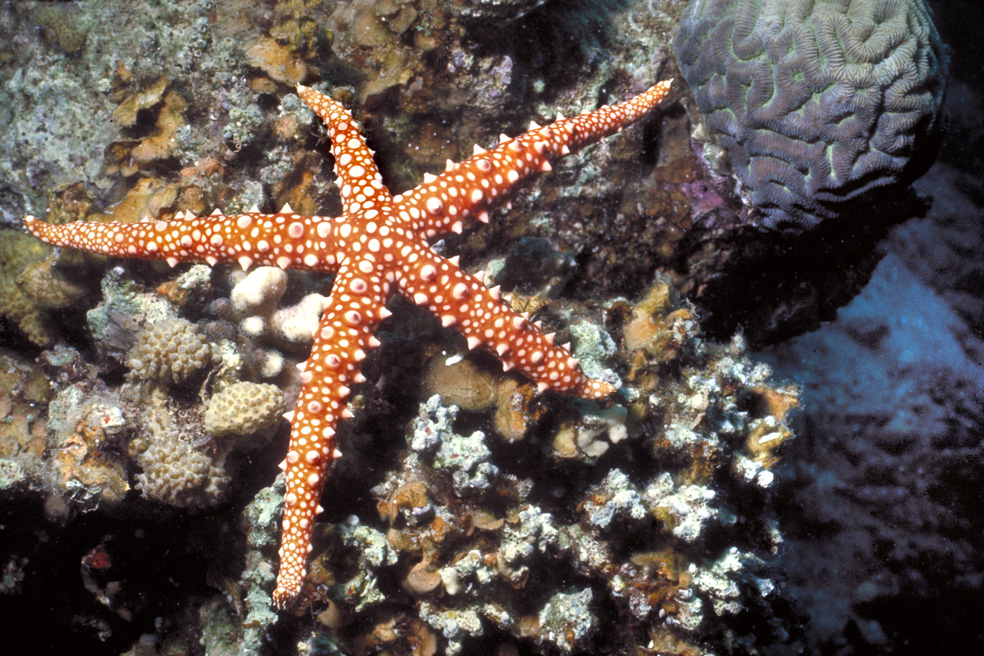
- Gomophia egyptiaca at the Red Sea

Scientific classification
- Kingdom: Animalia
- Phylum: Echinodermata
- Class: Asteroidea
- Order: Valvatida
- Family: Ophidiasteridae

Genera
- See text

= Ophidiasteridae =

Ophiodiasteridae

Family of starfishes

Ophidiasteridae (from Ancient Greek ὄφις (óphis), meaning "snake", and ἀστήρ (astḗr), meaning "star") are a family of sea stars with about 30 genera. Occurring both in the Indo-Pacific and Atlantic Oceans, ophidiasterids are greatest in diversity in the Indo-Pacific. Many of the genera in this family exhibit brilliant colors and patterns, which sometimes can be attributed to aposematism and crypsis to protect themselves from predators. Some ophidiasterids possess remarkable powers of regeneration, enabling them to either reproduce asexually or to survive serious damage made by predators or forces of nature (an example for this is the genus Linckia). Some species belonging to Linckia, Ophidiaster and Phataria shed single arms that regenerate the disc and the remaining rays to form a complete individual. Some of these also reproduce asexually by parthenogenesis.

The name of the family is taken from the genus Ophidiaster, whose limbs are slender, semitubular and serpentine.

== Systematics ==
These genera are accepted in the World Register of Marine Species:

- Andora A.M. Clark, 1967 -- 4 species
- Bunaster Döderlein, 1896 -- 4 species
- Certonardoa H.L. Clark, 1921 -- 1 species
- Cistina Gray, 1840 -- 1 species
- Copidaster A.H. Clark, 1948 -- 3 species
- Dactylosaster Gray, 1840 -- 1 species
- Devania Marsh, 1974 -- 1 species
- Dissogenes Fisher, 1913 -- 2 species
- Drachmaster Downey, 1970 -- 1 species
- Gomophia Gray, 1840 -- 4 species
- Hacelia Gray, 1840 -- 5 species
- Heteronardoa Hayashi, 1973 -- 2 species
- Leiaster Peters, 1852 -- 5 species
- Linckia Nardo, 1834 -- 9 species
- Narcissia Gray, 1840 -- 4 species
- Nardoa Gray, 1840 -- 9 species
- Oneria Rowe, 1981 -- 1 species
- Ophidiaster L. Agassiz, 1836 -- 24 species
- Pharia Gray, 1840 -- 1 species
- Phataria Gray, 1840 -- 2 species
- Plenardoa H.L. Clark, 1921 -- 1 species
- Pseudophidiaster H.L. Clark, 1916 -- 1 species
- Tamaria Gray, 1840 -- 18 species

Fossil genera

- †Chariaster
- †Sladenia
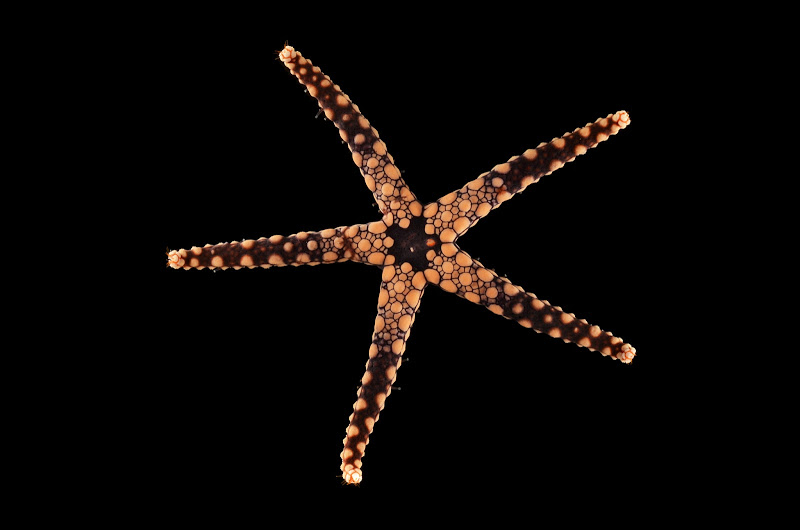
Fromia heffernani

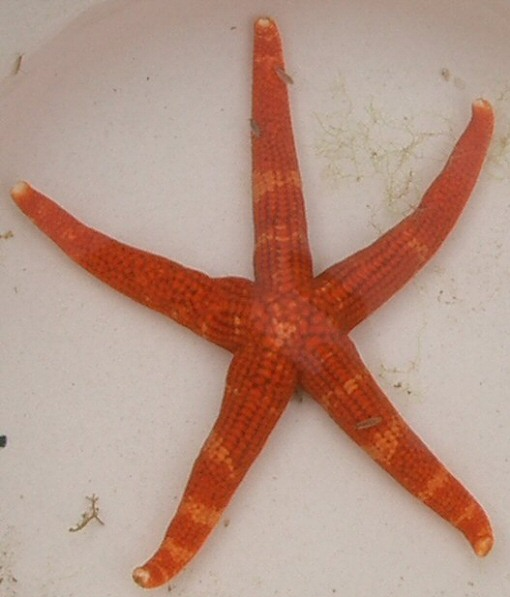
Certonardoa semiregularis

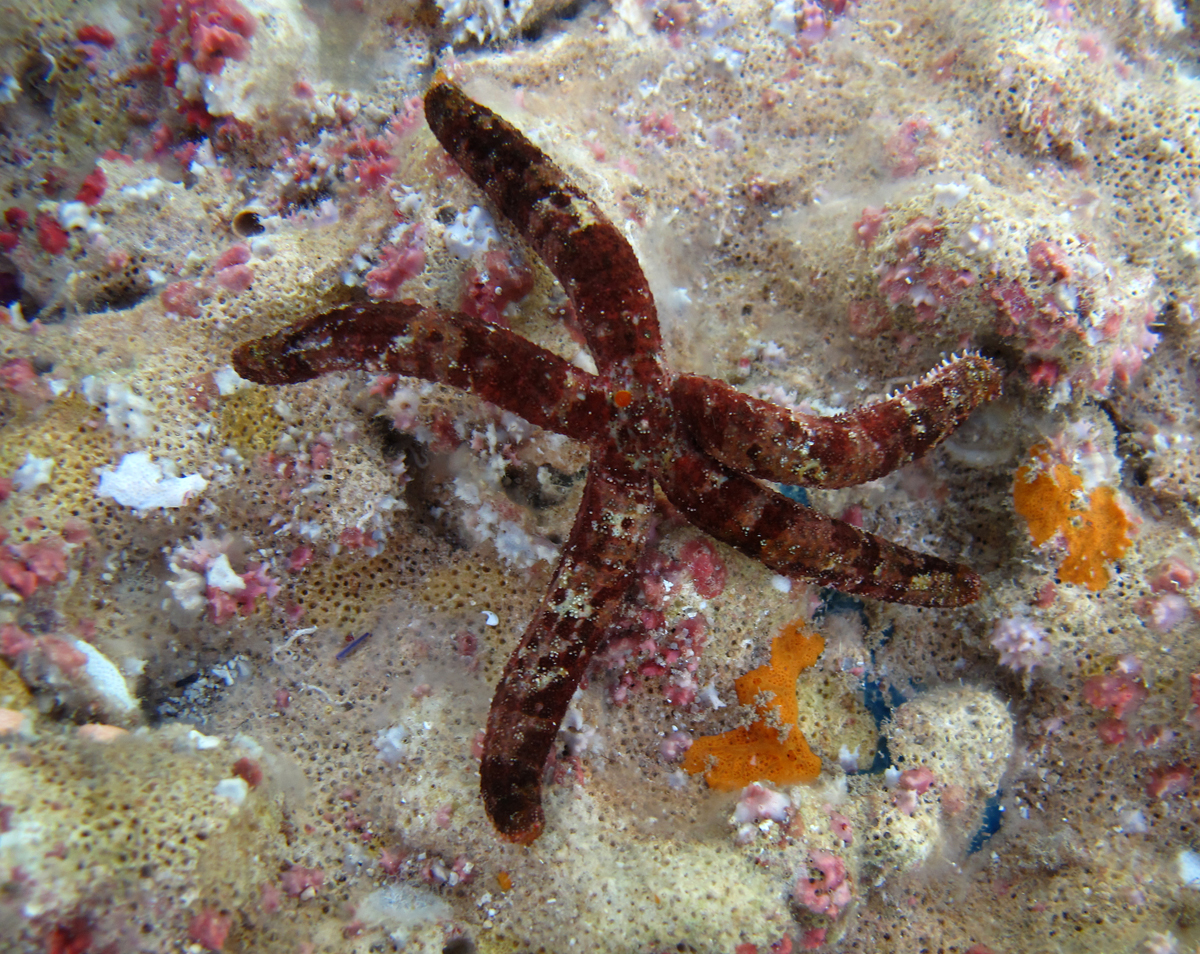
Dactylosaster cylindricus

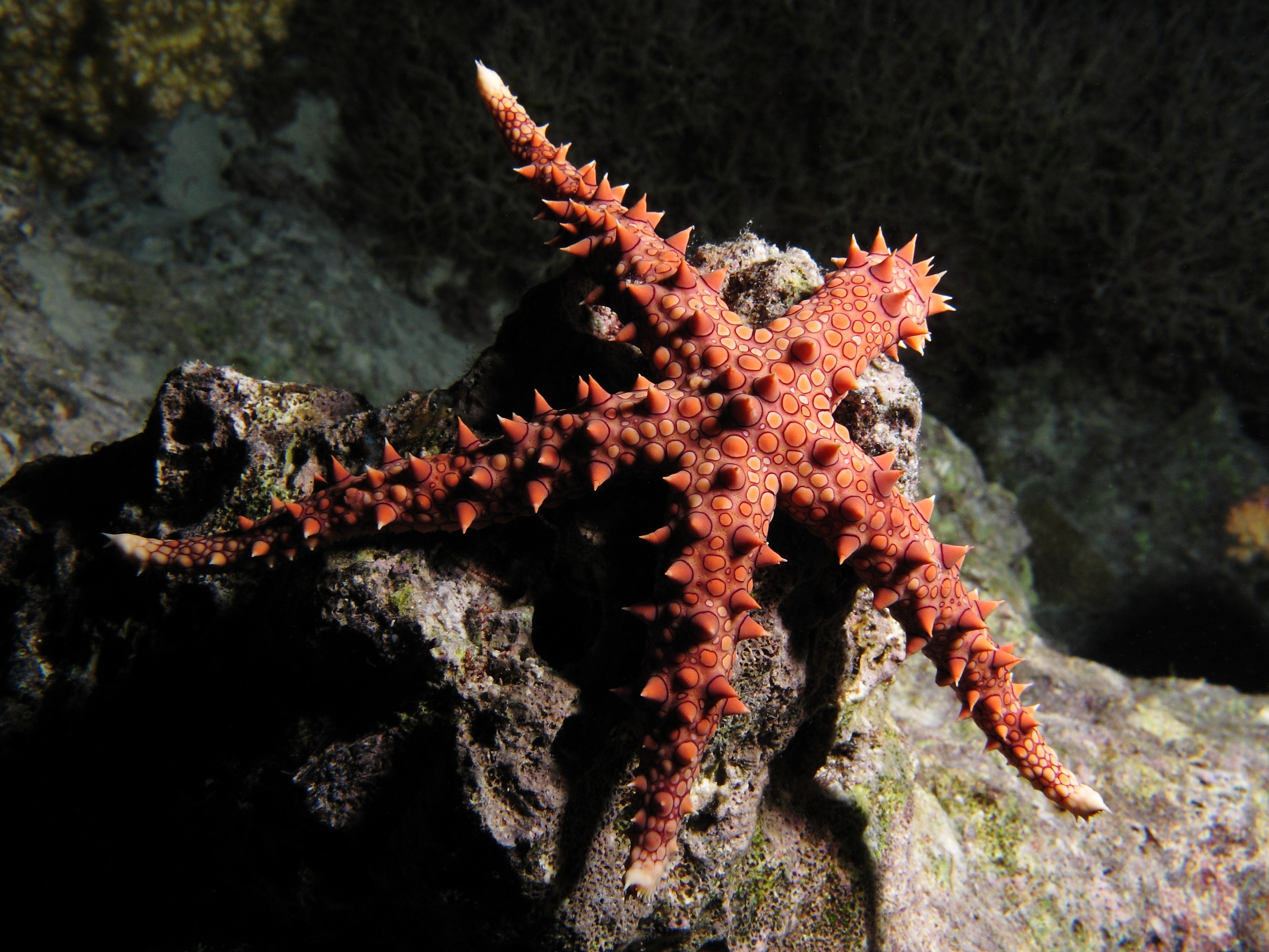
Gomophia egyptiaca

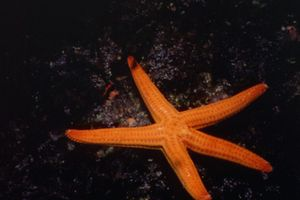
Hacelia attenuata

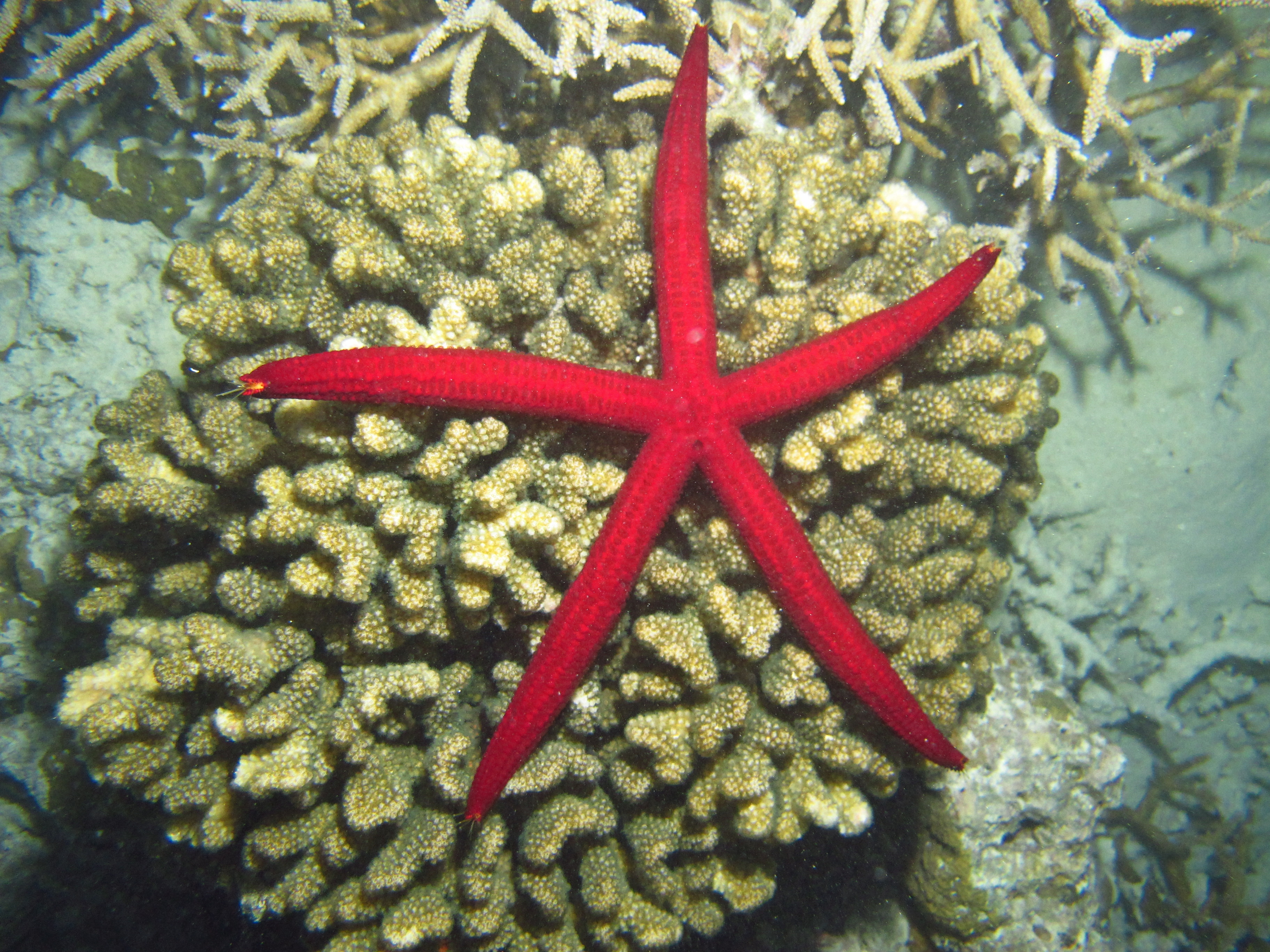
Leiaster speciosus

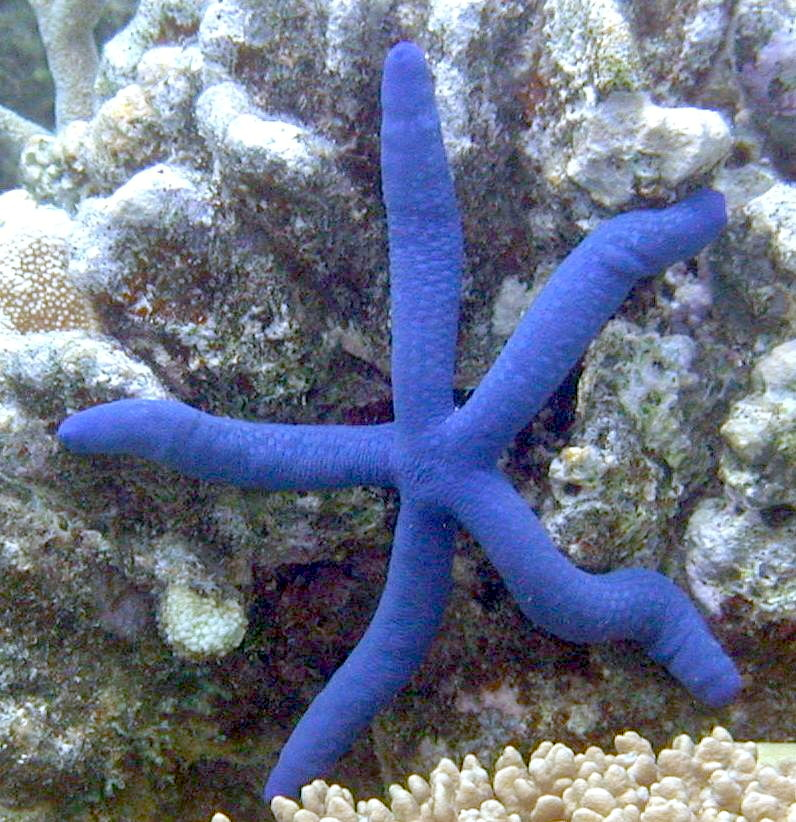
Linckia laevigata

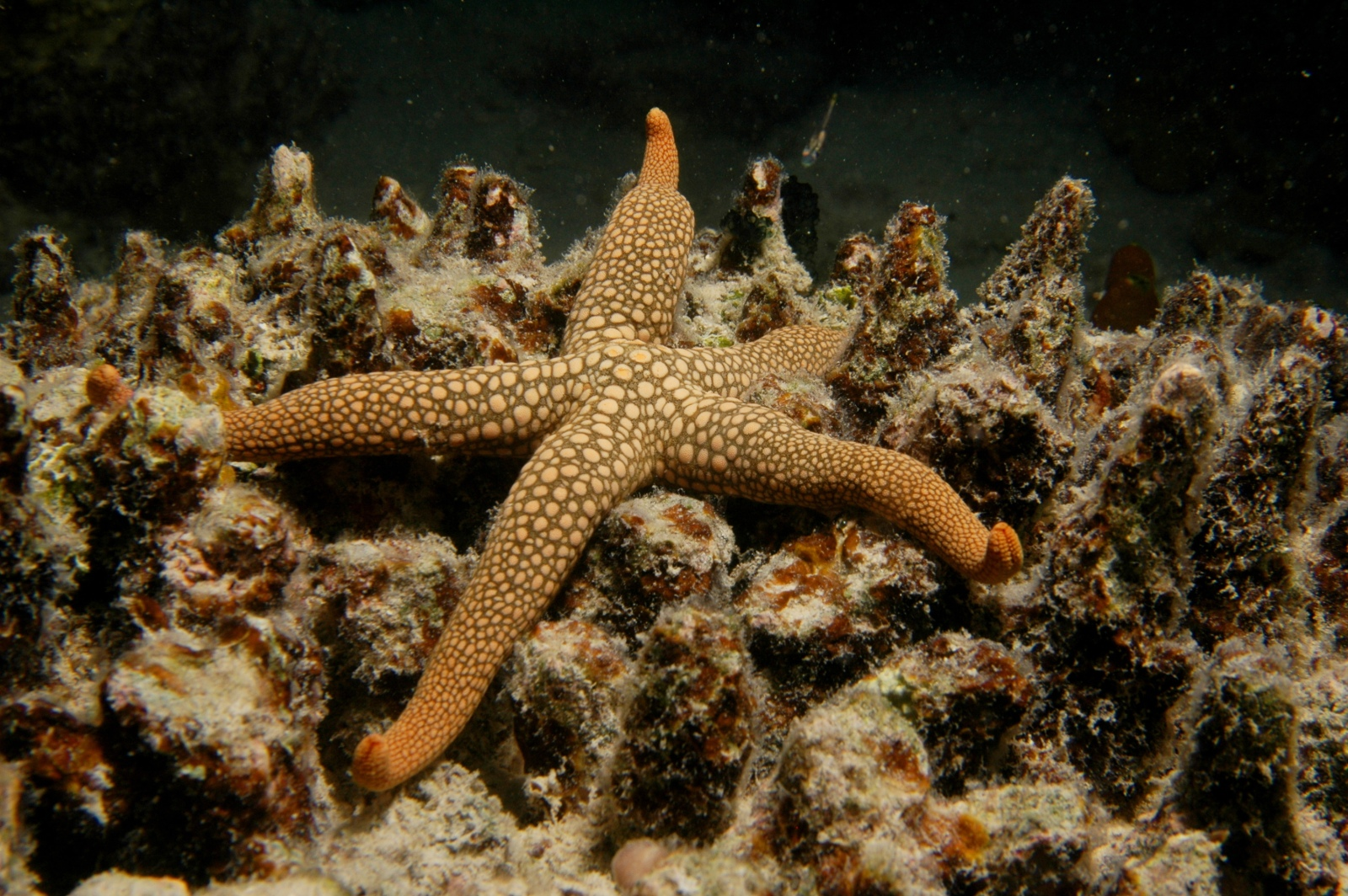
Nardoa novaecaledoniae

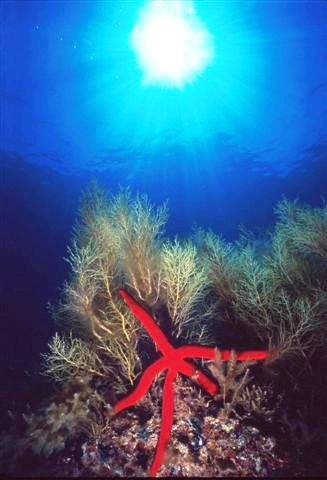
Ophidiaster ophidianus

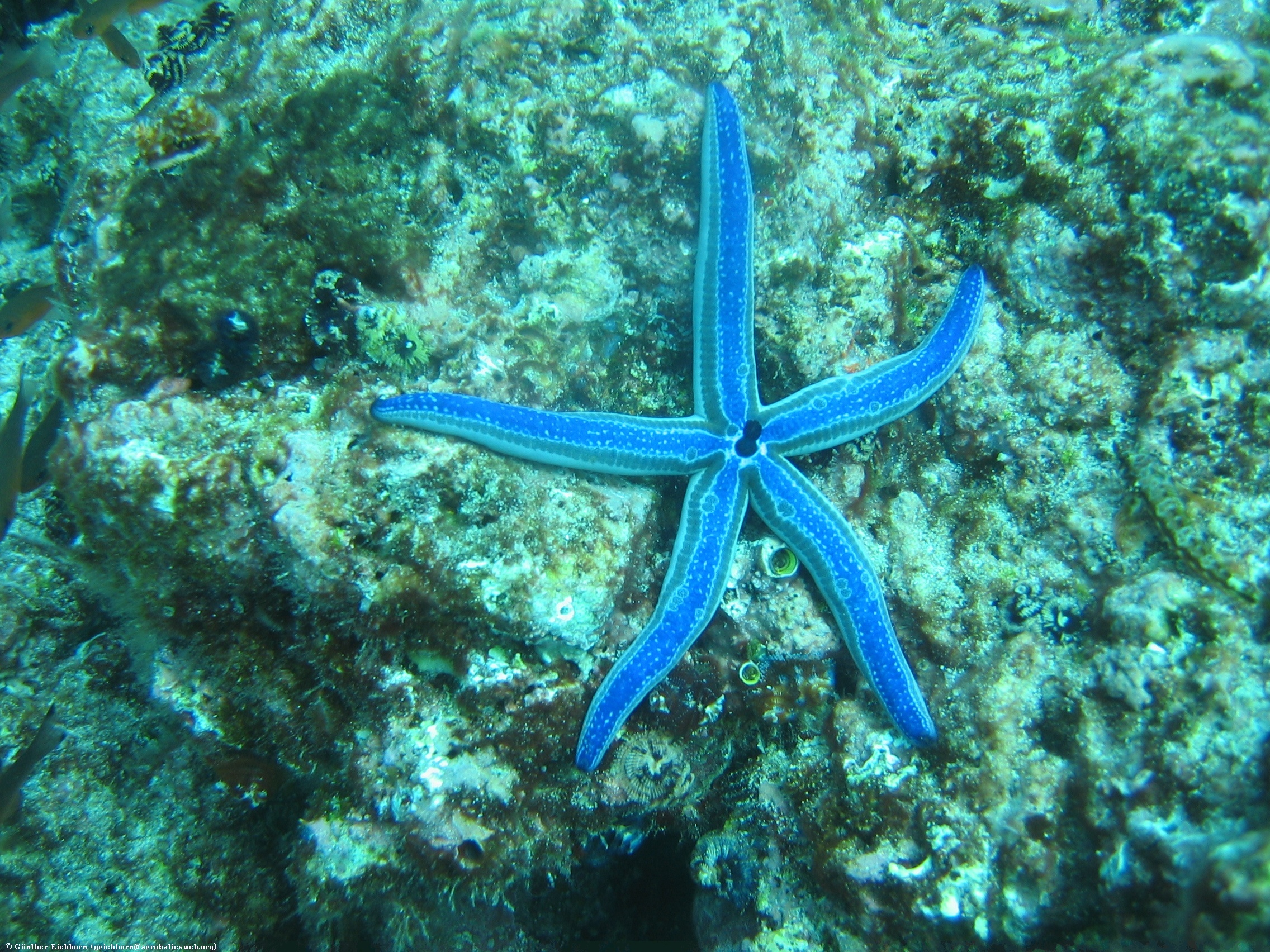
Phataria unifascialis

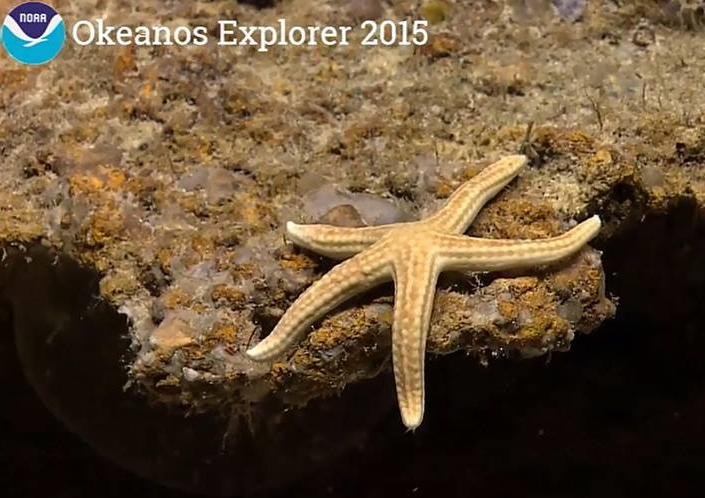
Tamaria halperni
