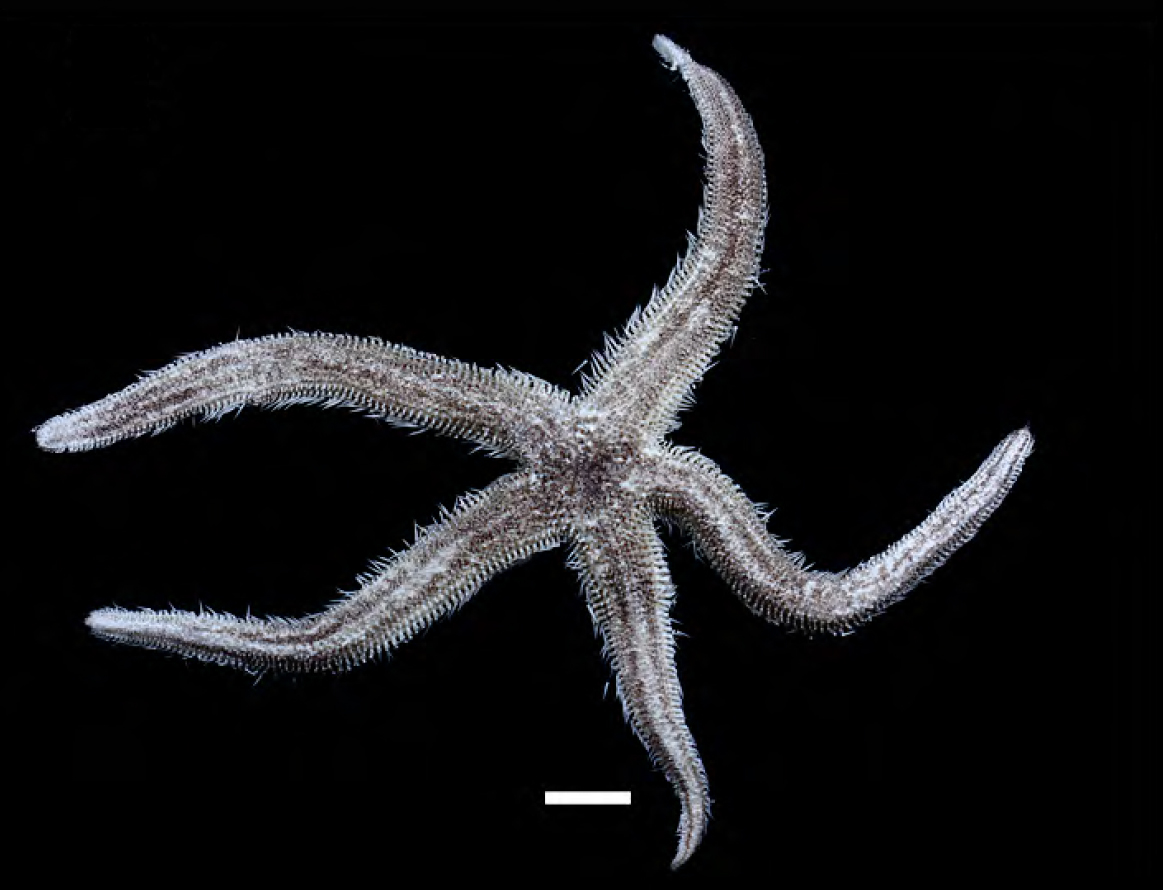

Scientific classification
- Kingdom: Animalia
- Phylum: Echinodermata
- Class: Asteroidea
- Order: Paxillosida
- Family: Luidiidae
- Genus: Luidia
- Species: L. superba

Binomial name
- Luidia superba A.H. Clark, 1917

= Luidia superba =

Species of starfish

Luidia superba is a tropical species of starfish in the family Luidiidae. A single specimen was found off the Pacific coast of Colombia in 1888; the species has since been found in the Galapagos Islands. It is endemic to this area and has not been recorded elsewhere.

== Description ==
A typical Luidia superba has five long, tapering arms with pointed tips. The holotype, the first specimen to be observed and described, had six arms, which was unfortunate as that led to the belief for many years that the normal number of limbs was six. As in other members of the genus, the upper surface of the disc and the arms is covered with paxillae, pillar-like spines with truncated ends. On the underside there are multiple rows of tube feet running down each arm. The colour is greenish-brown above and creamy yellow beneath, the tube feet being tipped with orange.

Luidia superba is probably the largest five-armed starfish in the world. The largest specimen from Tagus Cove in the Galapagos Islands had a radius, measured from the centre of the disc to the tip of the arms, of 41.5 centimetres (16.3 in). Its other dimensions were a disc radius of 4.5 centimetres (1.8 in), a maximum arm width of 6 centimetres (2.4 in) and a longest spine of 1.5 centimetres (0.59 in). By comparison, a specimen of the ten-armed Luidia magnifica from Hawaii had a radius of 38 centimetres (15 in) and the nine-armed Luidia savignyi at 37 centimetres (15 in) was the largest known starfish at the time at which it was measured. The site at Tagus Cove is species rich because of the upwelling of the nutrient-laden, cool water Equatorial Undercurrent nearby, providing an optimum environment for growth which may encourage gigantism.

== Distribution and habitat ==
The holotype was collected off the coast of Colombia by researchers in the vessel R. V. Albatross in 1888 at a depth of 66 metres (217 ft). This specimen was described by A. H. Clark in 1917 and for a long time was the only known example of the species. Other specimens were later recorded during the Cortez 1, 2 and 3 cruises undertaken to research Asterozoa in these waters in 1982 and 1985.

In 1977, following reports of a similar starfish in the Galapagos Islands, several specimens were observed at night on the seabed of Tagus Cove, Isabela Island, at depths of 9 metres (30 ft) to 18 metres (59 ft). During the day, the starfish bury themselves under about 10 centimetres (3.9 in) of sand, the only clue to their presence being a depression in the sand surface. In that location, these starfish were quite common in 1977, there being about one individual per 10 square metres (yards) of seabed.

More recently, the El Niño event of 1982–83 was particularly severe and afterwards, Luidia superba was no longer to be found in its previous location in Tagus Cove. Its fate in the Galapagos Islands remains unclear.

== Biology ==
The stomachs of the three specimens taken from Tagus Cove were examined to determine their diet. Unfortunately they were empty except for a few sea urchin spines, but like other members of its genus, Luidia superba is likely to be an opportunistic predator of large benthic fauna and a scavenger. Related species feed mainly on bivalve molluscs, brittle stars and sea urchins.
