= Paxilla =

The word "paxilla" may refer to:

- Paxilla (ossicle)
- Paxilla (genus): a genus of insects in the family Tetrigidae
