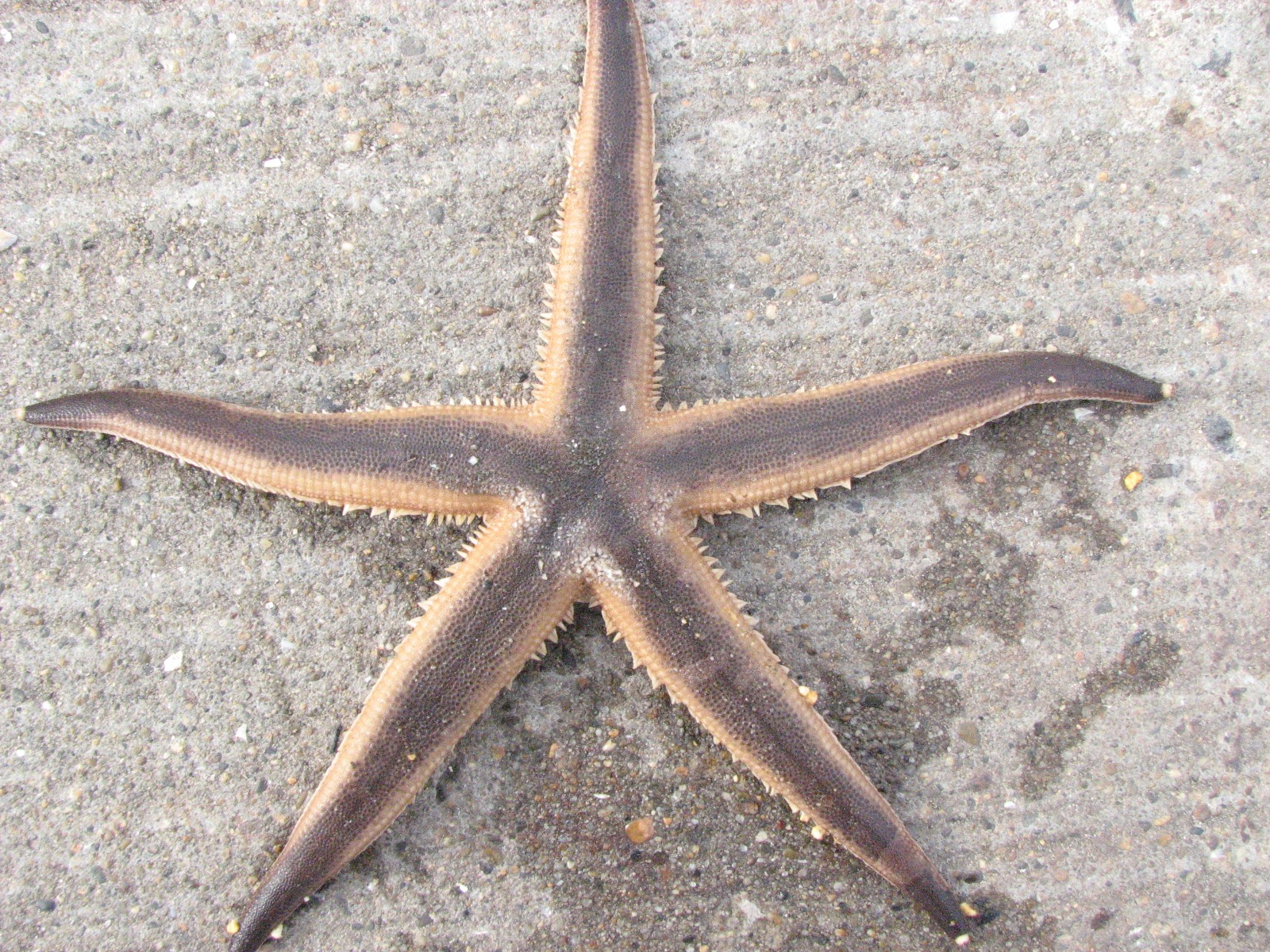

Scientific classification
- Kingdom: Animalia
- Phylum: Echinodermata
- Class: Asteroidea
- Order: Paxillosida
- Family: Luidiidae
- Genus: Luidia
- Species: L. quinaria

Binomial name
- Luidia quinaria von Martens, 1865

Synonyms
- Luidia aspera Sladen, 1889

= Luidia quinaria =

Spiny sand seastar

Species of starfish

The spiny sand seastar (Luidia quinaria) is a species of starfish in the family Luidiidae. It is found in shallow parts of the China Sea and in the vicinity of the Korean archipelago. The tissues of this starfish have been found to contain several secondary metabolites with medicinal potential.

== Subspecies ==
There are three subspecies:

- Luidia quinaria bispinosa Djakonov, 1950
- Luidia quinaria chinensis Doderlein, 1920
- Luidia quinaria quinaria von Martens, 1865

== Description ==
Luidia quinaria has a small central disc and five long slender arms fringed with short spines. The aboral (upper) surface is covered in small paxillae, pillar-like spines with flat tops giving a smooth, table-like surface. The general colour of the aboral surface is grey with contrasting pink or orange margins to the arms. The oral (under) surface is paler.

== Biology ==
Luidia quinaria is a predator and is found in shallow water on soft sediments. In Ise Bay in central Japan, it was found living throughout the oxygen-poor waters of the bay while another starfish, Astropecten scoparius, tended to occupy a separate zone near the mouth of the bay. Examination of the stomach contents of both starfish showed that Luidia quinaria largely fed on other echinoderms, in particular the brittle star Ophiura kinbergi, which formed more than half of the diet. The other starfish largely consumed molluscs, including the snail Voorwindia paludinoides and the clam Alvenius ojianus. The differences in the diet were thought to be due to the different availability of food items in various parts of the bay, these being due to variations in the type of sediment.

Several different biologically active steroids have been isolated from the tissues of Luidia quinaria. One of these, an asterosaponin, may prove useful in the treatment of coughs and asthma and may help clear mucus from airways.
