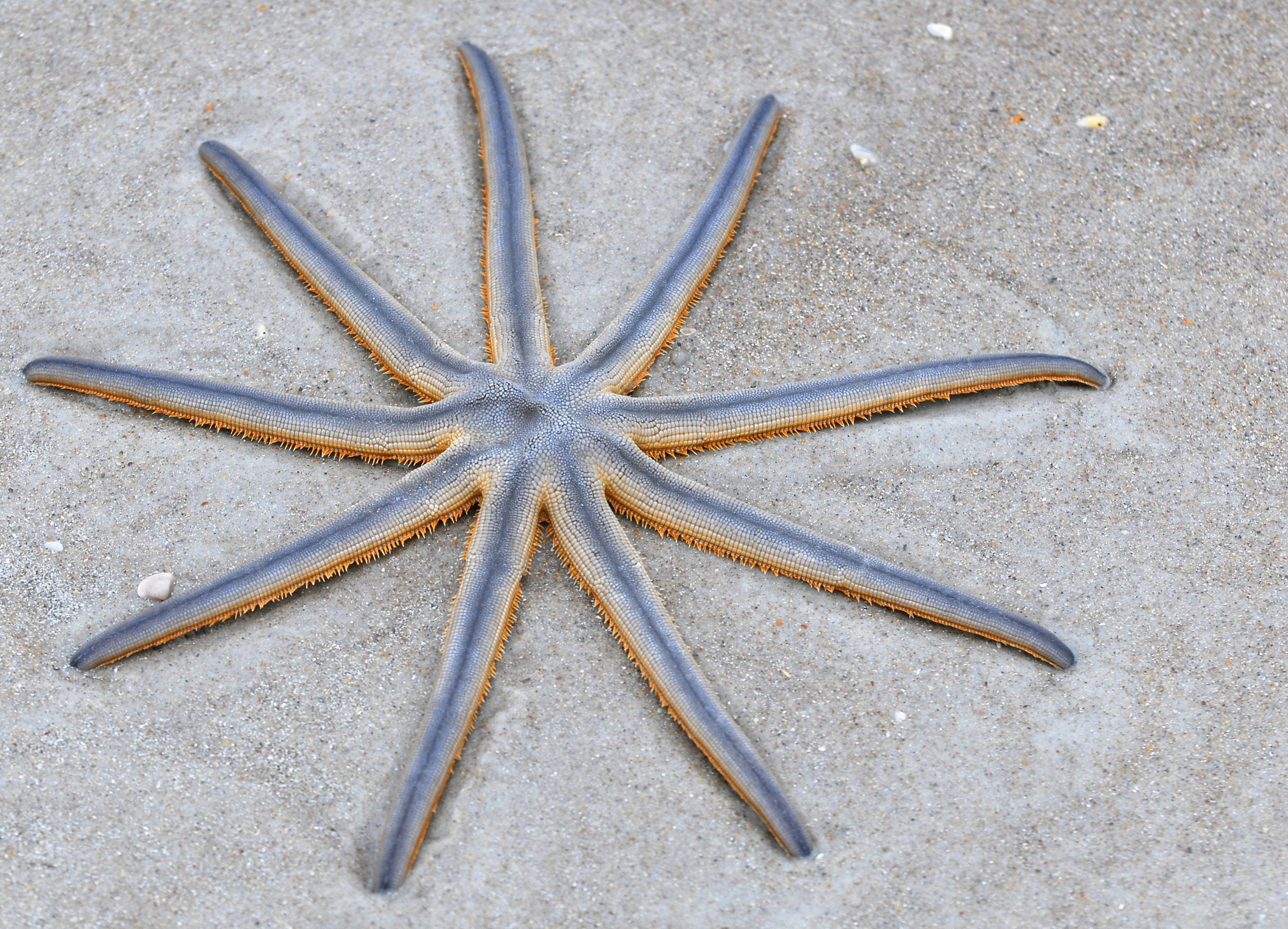

Conservation status
- Secure (NatureServe)

Scientific classification
- Kingdom: Animalia
- Phylum: Echinodermata
- Class: Asteroidea
- Order: Paxillosida
- Family: Luidiidae
- Genus: Luidia
- Species: L. senegalensis

Binomial name
- Luidia senegalensis (Lamarck, 1816)

Synonyms
- Asterias senegalensis Lamarck, 1816; Luidia marcgravii Steenstrup in Lutken, 1859

= Luidia senegalensis =

Nine-armed sea star

Species of starfish

Luidia senegalensis, the nine-armed sea star, is a tropical species of starfish in the family Luidiidae found in the western Atlantic Ocean.

== Description ==
The nine-armed sea star has long, slim tapering arms attached to a small circular central disc. It grows to a diameter of about 30 to 40 centimetres (12 to 16 in). The aboral or upper surface has a patchwork of closely packed spiny plates. The square ones near the edge of the arms are cream coloured and the irregular ones in a band running down the middle of the arms are grey. The margins of the arms are fringed with short white spines. The oral or underside of the sea star has further small white spiny plates down the edges of the arms and a central band of translucent, orange tube feet. Like other members of its genus, it has tube feet without suckers. The mouth is at the centre of the disc and there is no anus, undigested food fragments being expelled through the mouth.

== Distribution and habitat ==
The nine-armed sea star is found at depths of up to 40 metres (130 ft) around the coasts of Florida, in the Caribbean Sea, the Gulf of Mexico, and along the coast of South America to southern Brazil. It favours sandy, muddy or shelly seabeds in sheltered locations such as lagoons. It occupies the same range as the closely related gray sea star (Luidia clathrata) and has a very similar colouring but is easily distinguished by the number of arms, L. clathrata Nine.

== Biology ==
The nine-armed sea star is a scavenger and a predator and examination of the stomach contents show that the diet consists primarily of molluscs, small crustaceans and polychaete worms. Many of the food items were swallowed whole and had been ingested by the starfish everting its stomach and engulfing its prey. It also buries itself in the substrate and engulfs "mouthfuls" of sediment, filtering it through its oral spines and extracting detritus and small organisms such as brittle stars.

Breeding takes place at different times of the year in different parts of the range. The sea stars liberate their gametes into the sea where fertilisation takes place. The eggs hatch into bipinnaria larva which drift with the plankton. In about 25 days they have grown considerably and settle on the sea bed before undergoing metamorphosis into juvenile sea stars.

In polluted waters, the nine-armed sea star has been found to concentrate heavy metals into its tissues. Zinc, and to a lesser extent nickel, lead, cadmium and silver accumulate in the body wall and the pyloric caeca (parts of the gut which project into the arms).

In the Indian River Lagoon, a small brown polychaete worm sometimes lives on the surface of the sea star as a commensal. There may be several on one sea star and they probably benefit from the stirring up of the sediment caused by the sea star's activities.
