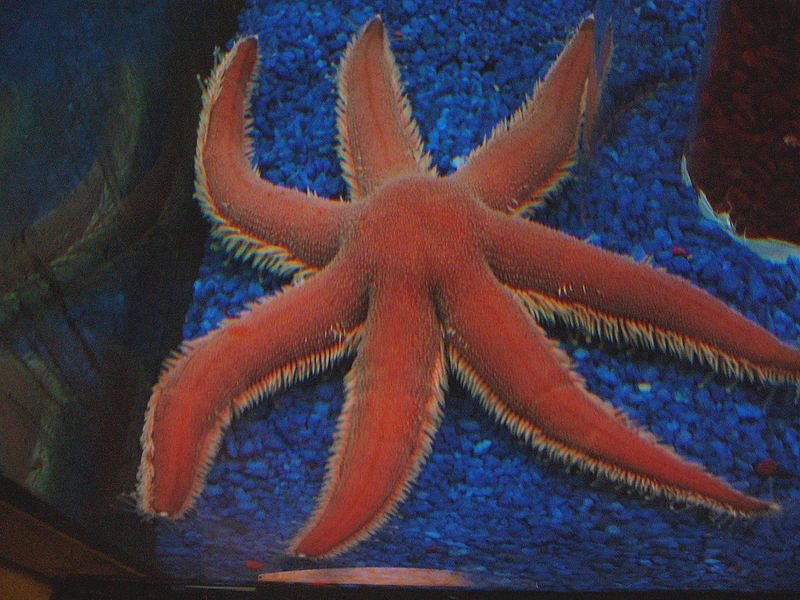

Scientific classification
- Kingdom: Animalia
- Phylum: Echinodermata
- Class: Asteroidea
- Order: Paxillosida
- Family: Luidiidae
- Genus: Luidia
- Species: L. ciliaris

Binomial name
- Luidia ciliaris (Philippi, 1837)

Synonyms
- Asterias ciliaris Philippi, 1837; Asterias imperati Delle Chiaje, 1841; Asterias pectinata Couch, 1840; Asterias rubens Johnston, 1836; Hemicnemis ciliaris Müller & Troschel, 1840; Luidia fragilissima Forbes, 1839; Luidia savignyi Muller & Troschel, 1842

= Luidia ciliaris =

Seven-armed starfish

Species of starfish

Luidia ciliaris, the seven-armed sea star, is a species of sea star (starfish) in the family Luidiidae. It is found in the eastern Atlantic Ocean and the Mediterranean Sea.

== Description ==
L. ciliaris is an orangeish-brown colour and has seven long arms radiating from a small disk. It is a large but fragile sea star, growing to 40 cm (16 in) across, and easily losing its arms (which afterwards regenerate). The arms have parallel sides and taper only near the tip. They have a conspicuous fringe of white spines along the margins. The upper surface is clothed in paxillae, spines shaped like a pillar with a flat top bearing tiny spinules. Also, many-lobed, nipple-like papillae are seen. No marginal plates are on the upper side of the arms, but those on the lower side bear pedicellariae with two valves. The tube feet are long and numerous. They do not have suction pads, but have two sets of terminal bulbs. The gonads are arranged in two rows along the length of the arms. A mouth is at the centre of the underside, with an oesophagus and a cardiac stomach, but no intestine, pyloric stomach, or anus.

== Distribution and habitat ==
L. ciliaris occurs on the seabed in the eastern Atlantic Ocean from Norway and the Faroe Islands southwards to Cape Verde and the Azores and in the Mediterranean Sea. It is found in the neritic zone at depths down to 400 m (1,300 ft), mainly on soft sediments into which it sometimes burrows, but sometimes on rock.

== Biology ==
L. ciliaris is a predator and scavenger and feeds predominantly on other echinoderms. A study in the Irish Sea found that the brittle stars, Ophiothrix fragilis and Ophiura albida, and the sea urchin, Psammechinus miliaris, formed the chief items of prey. The brittle star Ophiocomina nigra was also consumed, but in lesser quantities because it had more efficient escape strategies.

The seven-armed sea star moves rapidly in comparison with other sea stars. It hoists itself up on the tips of its arms, in which position it can "walk", before launching itself at its prey. The ring of plates around its mouth are extensible or can even be ruptured to enable it to ingest food items much bigger than the normal size of its mouth. In this way, it can pounce on a brittle star 25 cm (9.8 in) in diameter and completely engulf it. Undigested remains are ejected through the mouth.

L. ciliaris breeds in early summer. Each female releases millions of eggs into the water column, which stimulates the release of sperm by the males. About 4 days after fertilisation, the zygotes develop into bipinnarial larvae, which form part of the plankton. After several moults, the seven arms can be seen developing in what is called the "rudiment", which is connected to a stalk with several bands of cilia. The larvae reach a length of 35 mm (1.4 in) in 3 to 4 months. It does not become a brachiolarial larva as is the case in most sea star taxa. Instead, it settles on the sea bed and metamorphosis takes place. Functional tube feet appear in the juvenile before the larval tissue is fully reabsorbed.
