= Luidia alternata =

Scientific classification
- Kingdom: Animalia
- Phylum: Echinodermata
- Class: Asteroidea
- Order: Paxillosida
- Family: Luidiidae
- Genus: Luidia
- Species: L. alternata

Binomial name
- Luidia alternata Say, 1825

Synonyms
- Luidia bernasconiae A. H. Clark, 1945; Asterias alternata Say, 1825; Luidia variegata Perrier, 1875; Luidia granulosa Perrier, 1869

Species of sea star

Luidia alternata, commonly known as the banded Luidia or the banded sea star, is a species of sea star in the family Luidiidae.

== Description ==
L. alternata is a five-armed sea star with arms that can extend up to 6 in (15 cm) from its center point. The center disk is small, and the arms are relatively narrow. Covering the arms are small spines. The under surface is covered in narrow skeletal plates at right angles to the groove. Each of these plates have two long, slender spines at the margin. The upper aboral side can be gray, brown, greenish, purplish, or black with bands of tan or yellow. The tube feet are often orange.

Banded Sea Star (Luidia alternata) crawling in the shallows on Bonaire (Caribbean Netherlands).

== Distribution and habitat ==
L. alternata is found from North Carolina in the United States to Brazil, including throughout the Gulf of Mexico and the West Indies. Within this range, the sea star is found on sandy or muddy substrates at depths ranging from the low tide water line to 201 m (660 ft).

== Ecology ==
L. alternata feeds on benthic invertebrates, including brittle stars.
