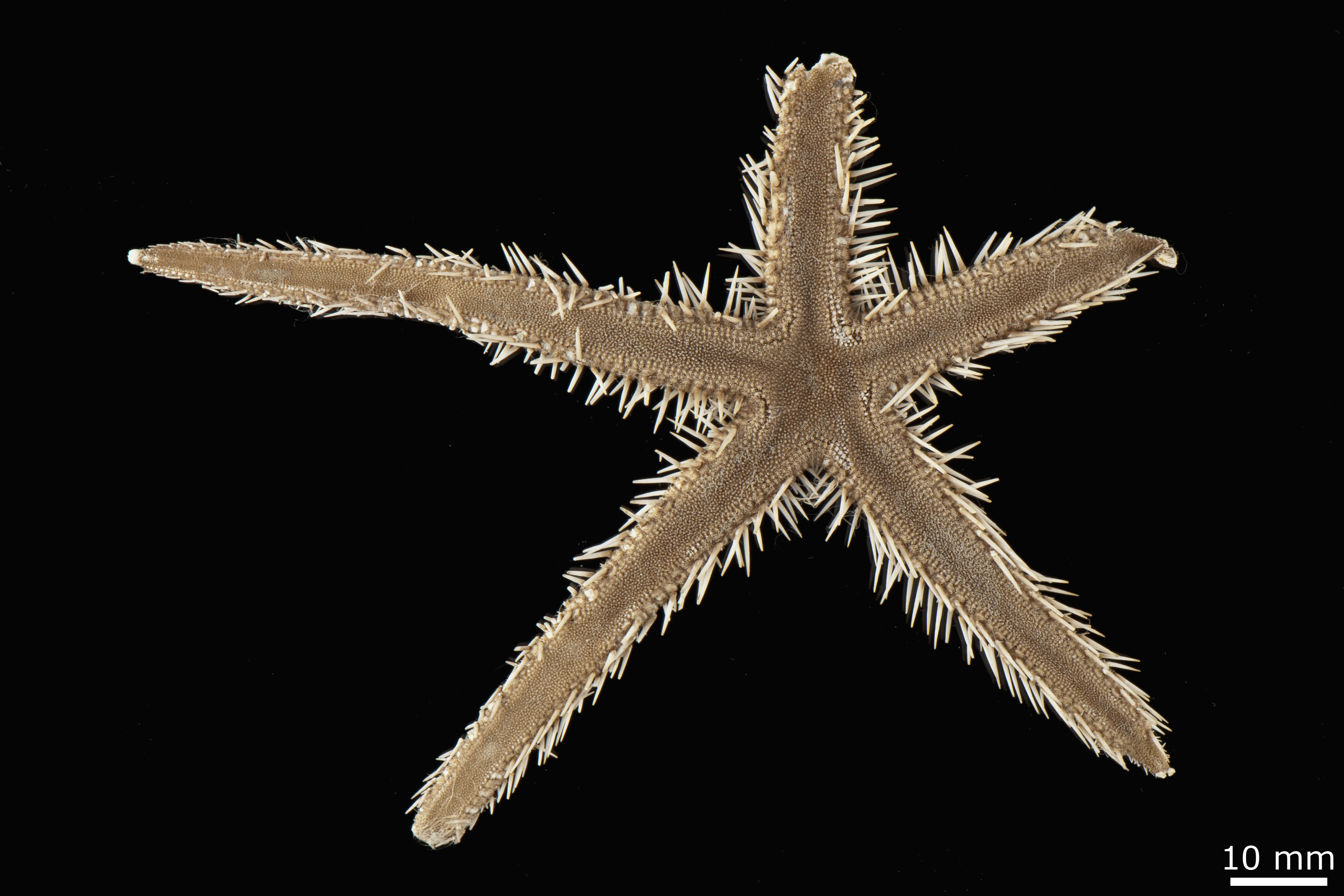
- Type specimen dredged off White Island

Scientific classification
- Domain: Eukaryota
- Kingdom: Animalia
- Phylum: Echinodermata
- Class: Asteroidea
- Order: Paxillosida
- Family: Luidiidae
- Genus: Luidia
- Species: L. neozelanica

Binomial name
- Luidia neozelanica Mortensen, 1925

= Luidia neozelanica =

Species of starfish

Luidia neozelanica is a species of starfish in the family Luidiidae. It is found in the southwestern parts of the Pacific Ocean off Australia, New Zealand and the Kermadec Islands.
