= Ophiocomina nigra =

Scientific classification
- Kingdom: Animalia
- Phylum: Echinodermata
- Class: Ophiuroidea
- Order: Ophiacanthida
- Family: Ophiotomidae
- Genus: Ophiocomina
- Species: O. nigra

Binomial name
- Ophiocomina nigra (Abildgaard in O.F. Müller, 1789)

Synonyms
- Asterias nigra Abildgaard in O.F. Müller, 1789; Ophiacantha (Ophiotreta) danae Mortensen, 1933; Ophiacantha danae Mortensen, 1933; Ophiacantha valenciennesi sensu Lieberkind, 1929; Ophiocoma granulata Forbes, 1839; Ophiocoma nigru (Abildgaard, in O.F. Müller, 1789); Ophiocoma nilssoni Müller & Troschel, 1842; Ophiocoma raschi G.O. Sars, 1872

Species of echinoderm

Ophiocomina nigra, commonly known as the black brittle star or black serpent star, is a species of marine invertebrate in the order Ophiurida. It occurs in the north-eastern Atlantic Ocean, the North Sea, and the Mediterranean Sea.

== Description ==
O. nigra is a large brittle star with five narrow arms up to 125mm long and a quite distinct central disc which is up to 25mm wide. The general colour is black or varying shades of brown, but pale coloured specimens occasionally occur. The upper surface of the disc is covered with fine granules which obscure the plates which cover the surface. On the underside the granules are restricted to the outer portion and the plates are visible towards the central mouth. This is surrounded by the feeding apparatus known as Aristotle's lantern with five toothed jaws each with oval jaw plates. There is a comb-like arrangement of spines down either side of the arms giving them a bristly appearance. On the upper side, each arm segment is covered by a broad plate with 5 to 7 spines. On the underside there are tube feet but these have no suckers.

== Distribution and habitat ==
O. nigra occurs in the eastern Atlantic Ocean from Norway south to the Azores, the North Sea and the Mediterranean Sea and in the Indian Ocean. It is found on rocks, boulders and gravel in the neritic zone down to about one hundred metres but is occasionally found at greater depths. It is tolerant of low salinity levels.

== Biology ==
O. nigra is a predator, scavenger and filter feeder. It catches pieces of organic detritus and small invertebrate prey with its arms and thrusts them into its mouth. It can scavenge from carcases or graze on algal films. As a suspension feeder, it raises one or more arms into the current of water flowing past. There is a net of mucous threads among the spines on the arms which trap plankton and other organic floating matter. These are then rolled into boluses and transported to the mouth by ciliary currents and the tube feet.

Breeding of O. nigra takes place in June in the Firth of Clyde, Scotland. A large female is often found in association with a smaller male, which clings above or below her. Fertilisation however takes place in the water column and is a chance meeting of two gametes. The larvae are planktonic and settle out after several months. The species seems to be slow-growing and long-lived, not becoming mature before the age of three or four years.

== Ecology ==
O. nigra is often found living in association with another brittle star, Ophiothrix fragilis. Numerous individuals of these two species sometimes form dense communities with hundreds of brittle stars per square metre. These beds may extend several hundred square metres over sandy and pebbly sediment on the sea floor and contain millions of brittle stars. These can be either O. nigra or O. fragilis, or a mixed community of the two. The vast social agglomerations can be advantageous in enabling the brittle stars to filter feed in fast moving currents which would otherwise sweep them away. Often the bed consists of adults and newly settled juveniles, with intermediate sized individuals living elsewhere. Other echinoderms likely to be in the same vicinity (and enjoying the feast) are the predatory starfish, Asterias rubens, Luidia ciliaris and Crossaster papposus and the sea urchins, Echinus esculentus and Psammechinus miliaris. Also present are likely to be the crabs Cancer pagurus, Necora puber and Liocarcinus spp., and the hermit crab, Pagurus bernhardus. On rocky outcrops among the seething mass of brittle stars the soft coral, Alcyonium digitatum, the hydroid, Nemertesia antennina and the sea anemone, Metridium senile, are often found. Another sea anemone, Urticina felina, may be semi-buried in the sediment and surrounded by an area clear of brittle stars.
