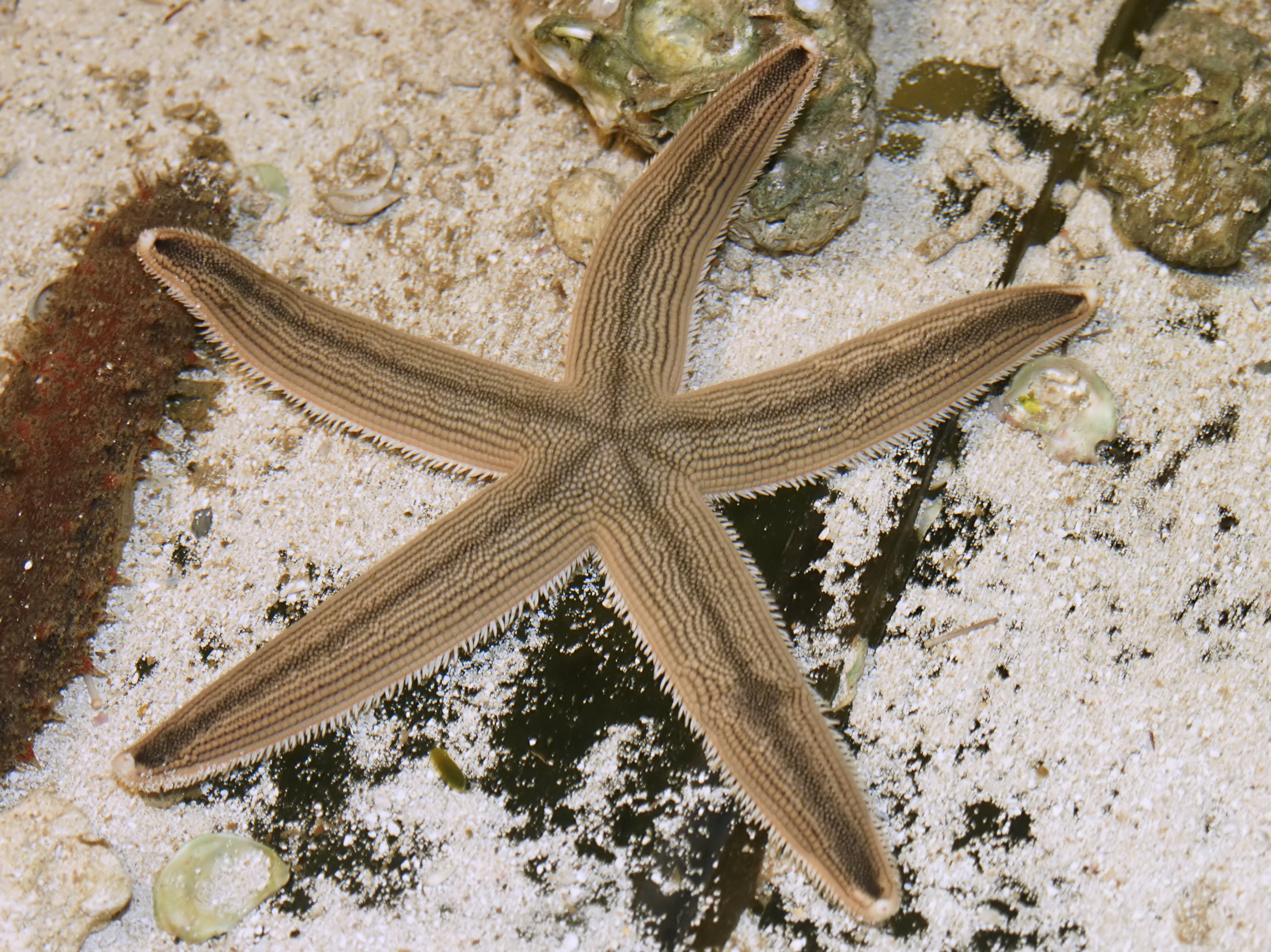

Scientific classification
- Domain: Eukaryota
- Kingdom: Animalia
- Phylum: Echinodermata
- Class: Asteroidea
- Order: Paxillosida
- Family: Luidiidae
- Genus: Luidia
- Species: L. clathrata

Binomial name
- Luidia clathrata (Say, 1825)

Synonyms
- Asterias clathrata Say, 1825

= Luidia clathrata =

Species of starfish

Luidia clathrata is a tropical species of starfish in the family Luidiidae. It is variously known as the slender-armed starfish, the gray sea star, or the lined sea star. It is found in the western Atlantic Ocean.

== Description ==
Luidia clathrata is a large, flattish starfish, sometimes growing to a diameter of 30 cm (12 in). It has a relatively small disc and five slender arms, which are two or three times the diameter of the disc. The upper surface of the disc and arms is clad in longitudinal rows of calcified plates called ossicles, and in paxillae, pillar-like spines with flattened summits covered with minute spinules. No plates are found along the margins of the arms, these being replaced by paxillae, but on the underside, the marginal plates are large and themselves covered with paxillae. The tube feet, found in longitudinal rows on the underside, do not have suckers, but have two swollen regions. A mouth is in the centre of the underside, with an oesophagus and cardiac stomach which can be everted. The gonads are underneath the sides of each arm. Its colour is usually grey or light brown, but can be tinged with pink. The central row of plates on the upper side of the arms is usually dark grey or black. The underside of the starfish is a paler colour.

== Distribution and habitat ==
L. clathrata is found around the coastlines of the western Atlantic Ocean, from Virginia south to Brazil, the Caribbean Sea, and the Gulf of Mexico. It is usually on sandy or muddy sea beds down to a depth around 40 m (130 ft), although it is occasionally found in deeper waters down to 100 m (330 ft).

== Biology and ecology ==
When L. clathrata loses part or all of an arm through predation, it can regenerate the limb. The damaged area is sealed off, and a new small arm-tip appears within a week. Subsequent development is at the rate of about 3.7 mm (0.15 in) a month, although this slows down when regeneration is nearly complete. A study on the regenerative capacity of L. clathrata found that increased ocean acidification, as is likely to happen under global warming, had no significant effect on the starfish's ability to regenerate its limbs.

L. clathrata is both a predator and a forager. It selectively feeds on the "coot clam", Mulinia lateralis, when it is abundant, using chemoreceptors to help it find its prey. The coot clam is the preferred food of L. clathrata in Tampa Bay in Florida. At other times, it feeds by ingesting sediment and straining the material through spines around its mouth, extracting food particles in the process. Its diet includes both gastropod and bivalve molluscs, foraminiferans, nematodes, ostracods, small crustaceans, and detritus. It is photosensitive and mostly spends the daylight hours buried in the sediment. While buried, it sometimes everts its stomach to ingest detritus.

L. clathrata spawns annually. The larvae pass through a planktonic bipinnaria stage, which lasts about a month before settling on the seabed, undergoing metamorphosis, and becoming juvenile starfish.
