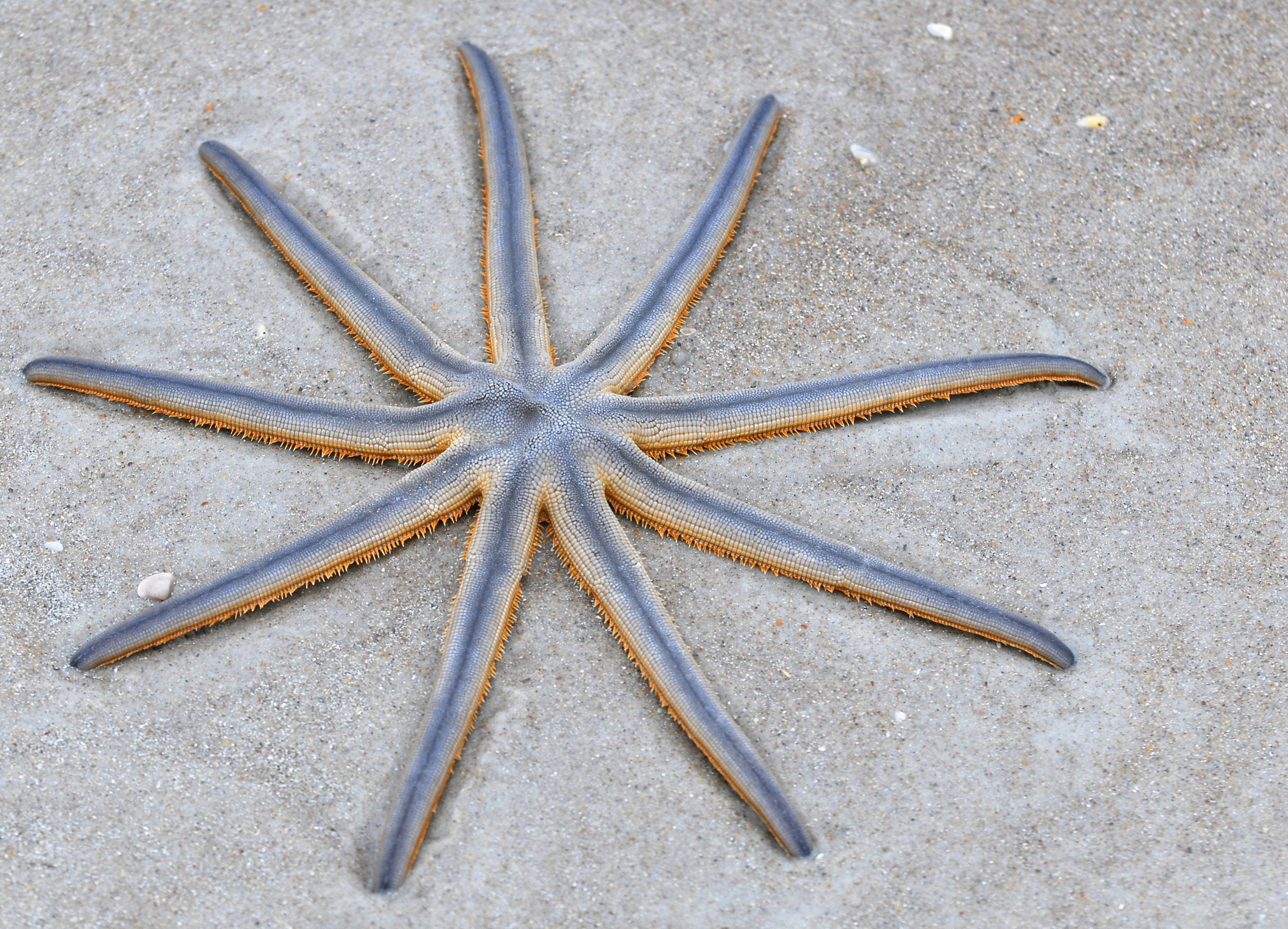
- Luidia senegalensis

Scientific classification
- Kingdom: Animalia
- Phylum: Echinodermata
- Class: Asteroidea
- Order: Paxillosida
- Family: Luidiidae; Sladen, 1889
- Genus: Luidia; Forbes, 1839

Synonyms
- Alternaster Döderlein, 1920; Armaster Döderlein, 1920; Astrella Perrier, 1882; Denudaster Döderlein, 1920; Hemicnemis Müller & Troschel, 1840; Integraster Döderlein, 1920; Luidia (Luidia) Forbes, 1839; Luidia (Platasterias) (Gray, 1871); Maculaster Döderlein, 1920; Penangaster Döderlein, 1920; Petalaster Gray, 1840; Quinaster Döderlein, 1920; Senegaster Döderlein, 1920

= Luidia =

Genus of echinoderms

Luidia is a genus of starfish in the family Luidiidae in which it is the only genus. Species of the family have a cosmopolitan distribution.

== Characteristics ==
Members of the genus are characterised by having long arms with pointed tips fringed with spines. Their upper surfaces are covered with paxillae, pillar-like spines with flattened summits covered with minute spinules. The upper marginal plates are replaced by paxillae, but the lower marginal plates are large and covered with paxillae. The tube feet do not have suckers, but have two swollen regions. A mouth, oesophagus, and cardiac stomach are seen, but no pyloric stomach or anus is present. The gonads are underneath the sides of each arm.

The early larval stages of starfish are known as bipinnarial larvae, and members of this genus do not continue their development after this stage into a brachiolar stage before undergoing metamorphosis. However, they are capable of larval cloning, with asexual reproduction taking place while they are larvae. This has been shown to take place both in the field and in laboratory cultures and has been studied by molecular analysis of sequences of mitochondrial tRNA to identify the taxa involved.

== Species ==
As of 2024, the following species are recognized by the World Register of Marine Species:

- Luidia alternata (Say, 1825) – banded sea star
- Luidia amurensis Doderlein, 1920
- Luidia armata Ludwig, 1905
- Luidia asthenosoma Fisher, 1906
- Luidia atlantidea Madsen, 1950
- Luidia australiae Doderlein, 1920
- Luidia avicularia Fisher, 1913
- Luidia barbadensis Perrier, 1881
- Luidia bellonae Lütken, 1865
- Luidia changi Liu, Liao & Li, 2006
- Luidia ciliaris (Philippi, 1837) – seven-armed star
- Luidia clathrata (Say, 1825) – slender-armed starfish, gray sea star, lined sea star
- Luidia columbia (Gray, 1840)
- Luidia denudata Koehler, 1910
- Luidia difficilis Liu, Liao & Li, 2006
- Luidia ferruginea Ludwig, 1905
- Luidia foliolata (Grube, 1866) – spiny mudstar, leafy flat star, sand star
- Luidia gymnochora Fisher, 1913
- Luidia hardwicki (Gray, 1840)
- Luidia herdmani A.M. Clark, 1953
- Luidia heterozona Fisher, 1940
- Luidia hexactis H.L. Clark, 1938
- Luidia inarmata Doderlein, 1920
- Luidia integra Koehler, 1910
- Luidia iwakiensis Kobayashi, Hibino, Yamato & Fujita, 2024
- Luidia latiradiata (Gray, 1871)
- Luidia lawrencei Hopkins & Knott, 2010
- Luidia longispina Sladen, 1889
- Luidia ludwigi Fisher, 1906
- Luidia maculata Müller & Troschel, 1842
- Luidia magellanica Leipoldt, 1895
- Luidia magnifica Fisher, 1906 – magnificent star
- Luidia mauritiensis Koehler, 1910
- Luidia neozelanica Mortensen, 1925
- Luidia orientalis Fisher, 1913
- Luidia patriae Bernasconi, 1941
- Luidia penangensis de Loriol, 1891
- Luidia phragma H.L. Clark, 1910
- Luidia porteri A.H. Clark, 1917
- Luidia prionota Fisher, 1913
- Luidia quinaria von Martens, 1865 – spiny sand sea star
- Luidia sagamina Doderlein, 1920
- Luidia sarsii Düben & Koren, 1845
- Luidia savignyi (Audouin, 1826)
- Luidia senegalensis (Lamark, 1816) – nine-armed sea star
- Luidia sibogae Doderlein, 1920
- Luidia superba A.H. Clark, 1917 – giant sea star
- Luidia tessellata Lutken, 1859
- Luidia yesoensis Goto, 1914

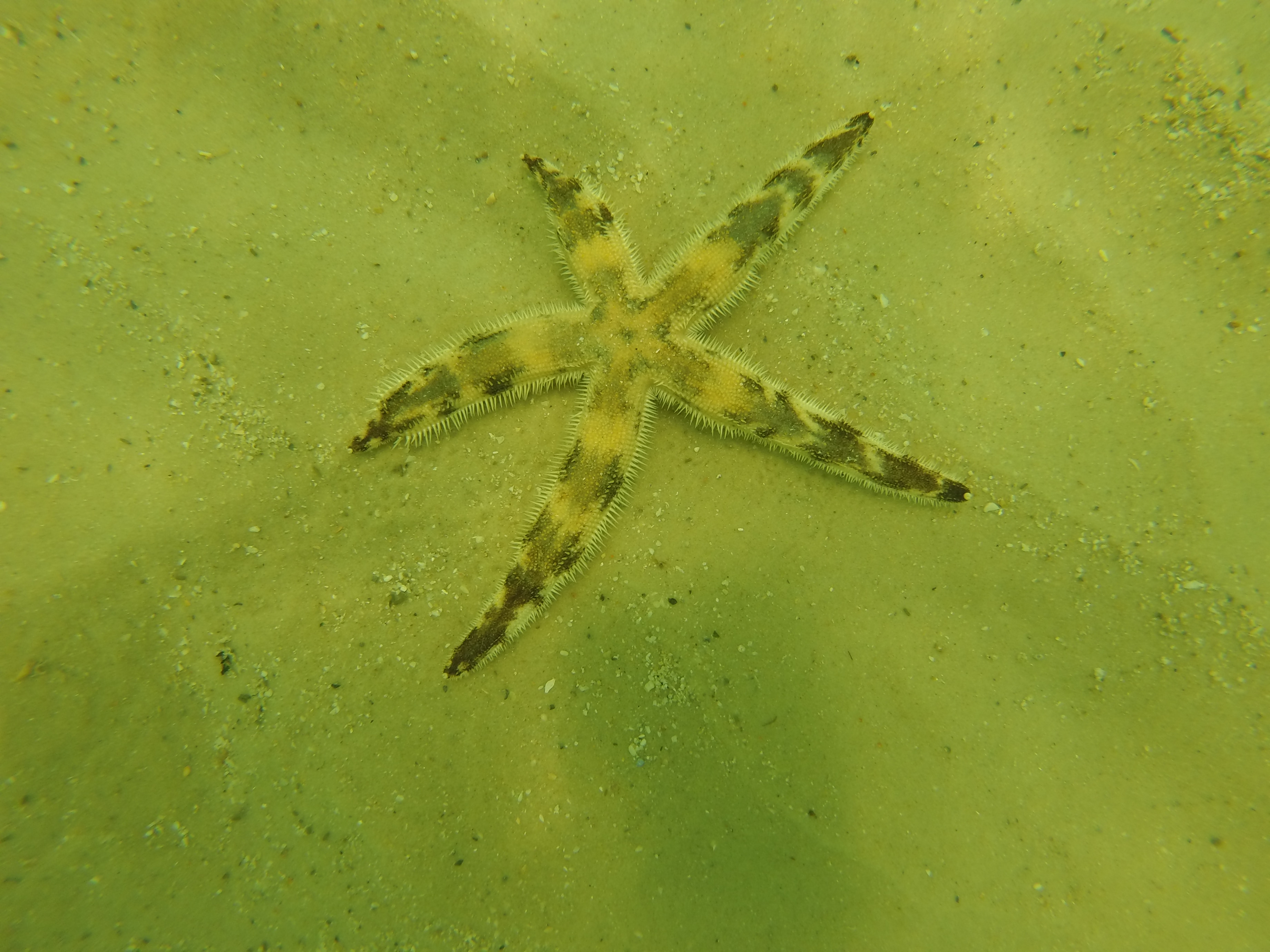
Luidia alternata

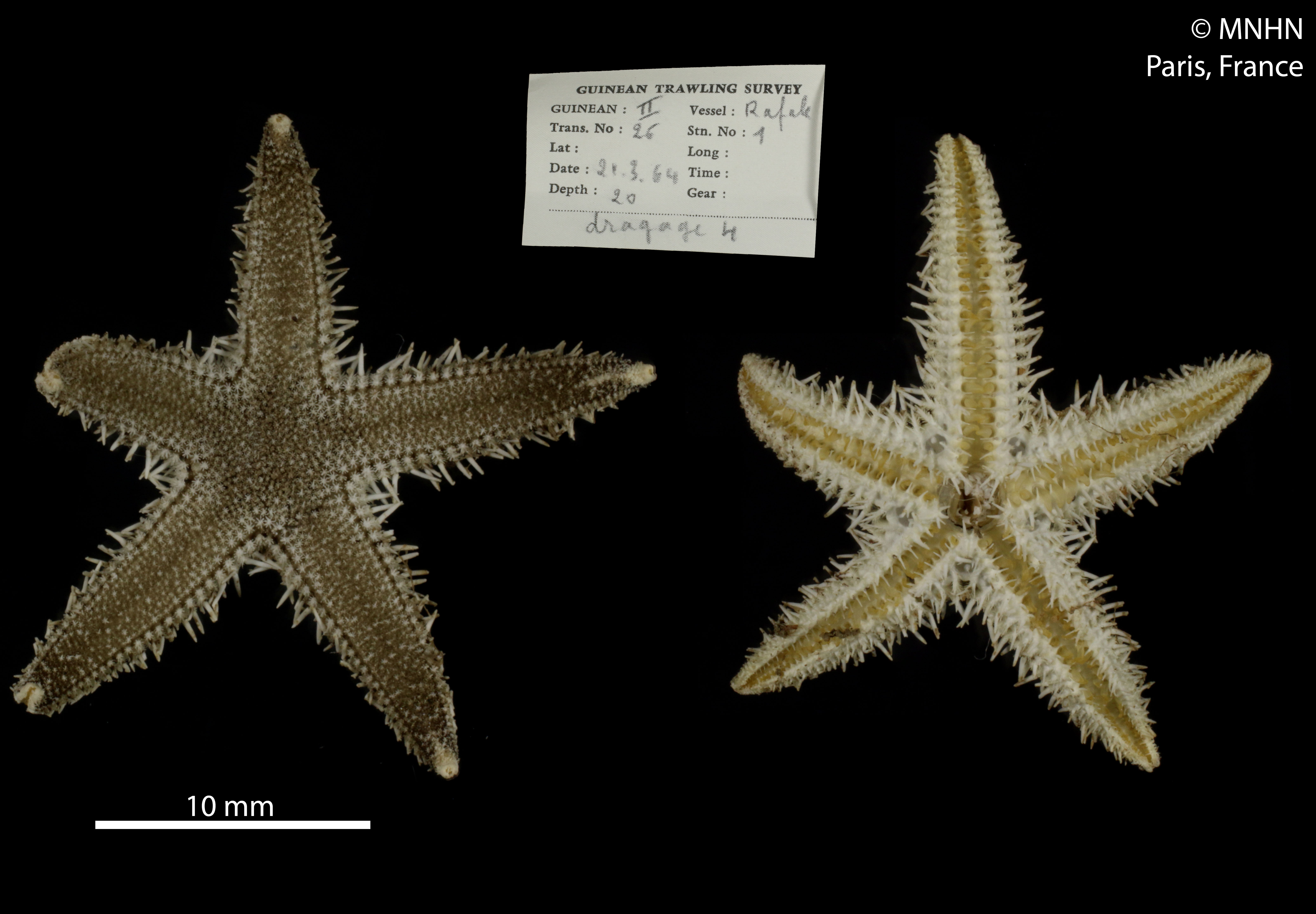
Luidia atlantidea (MNHN)

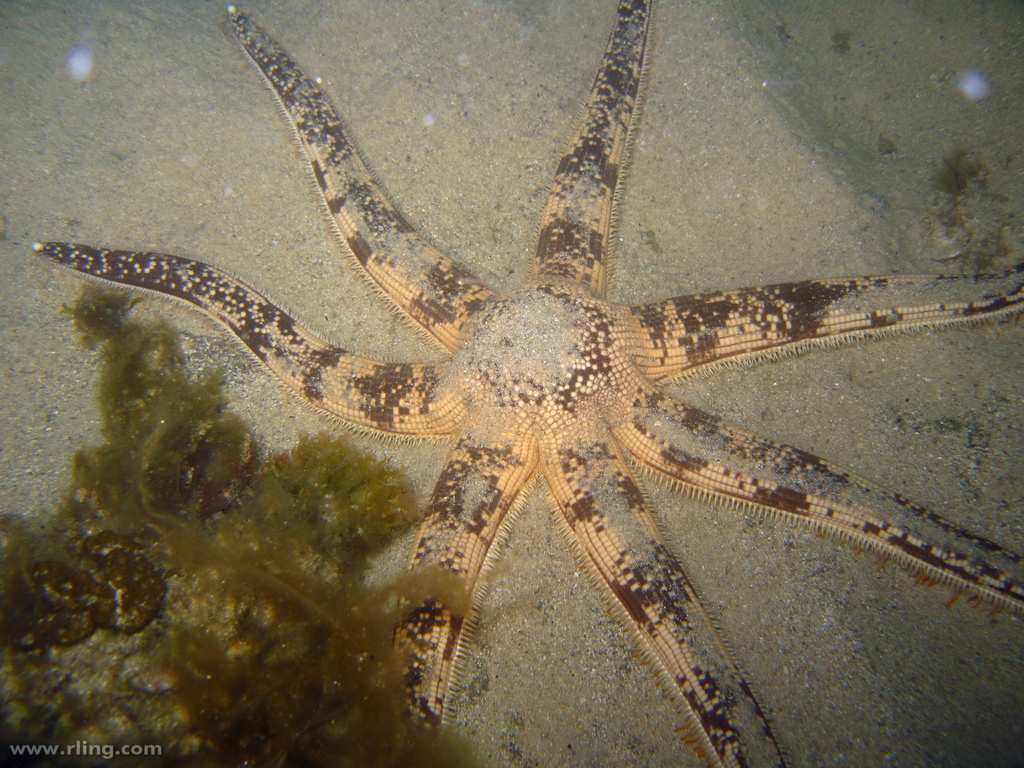
Luidia australiae.

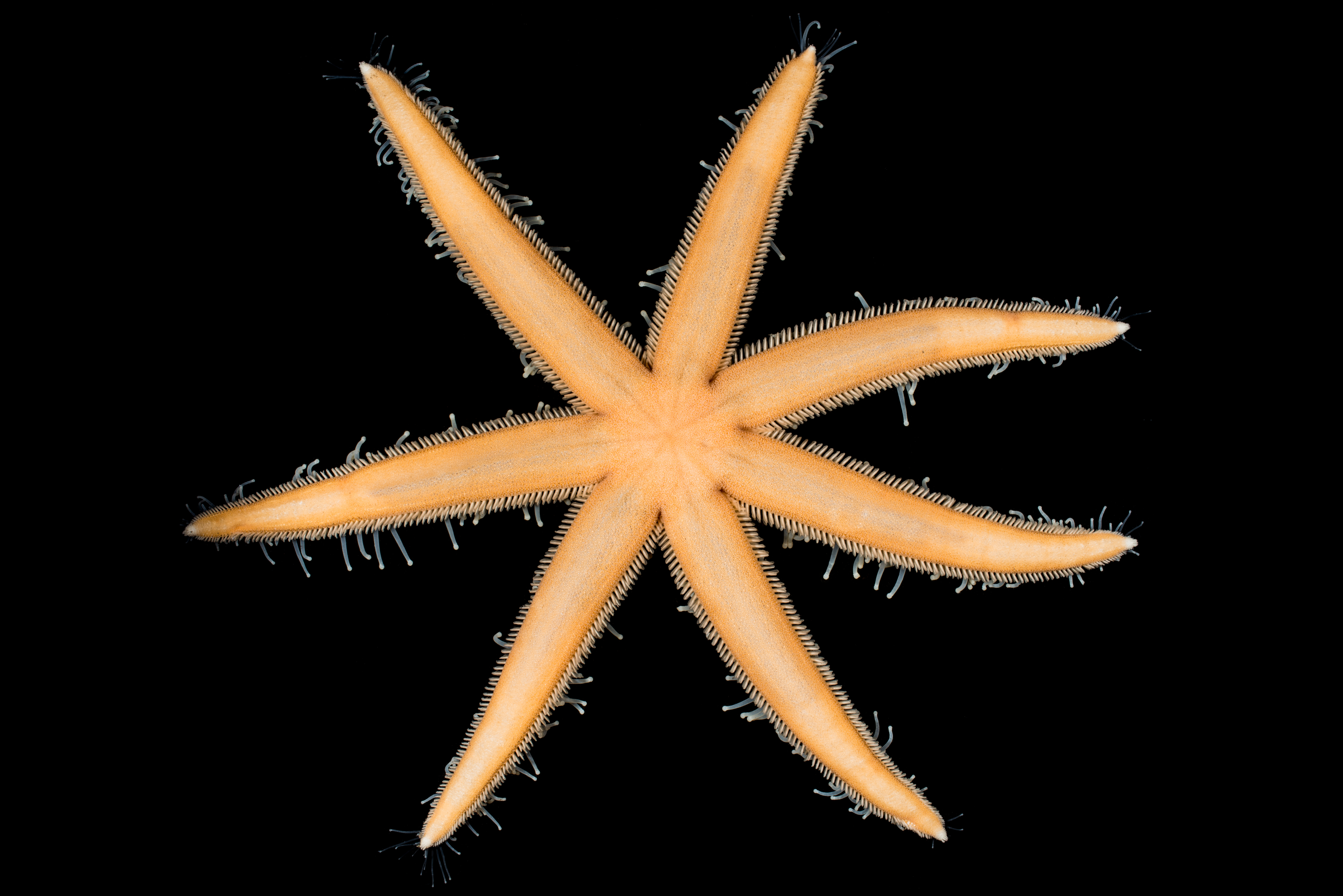
Luidia ciliaris

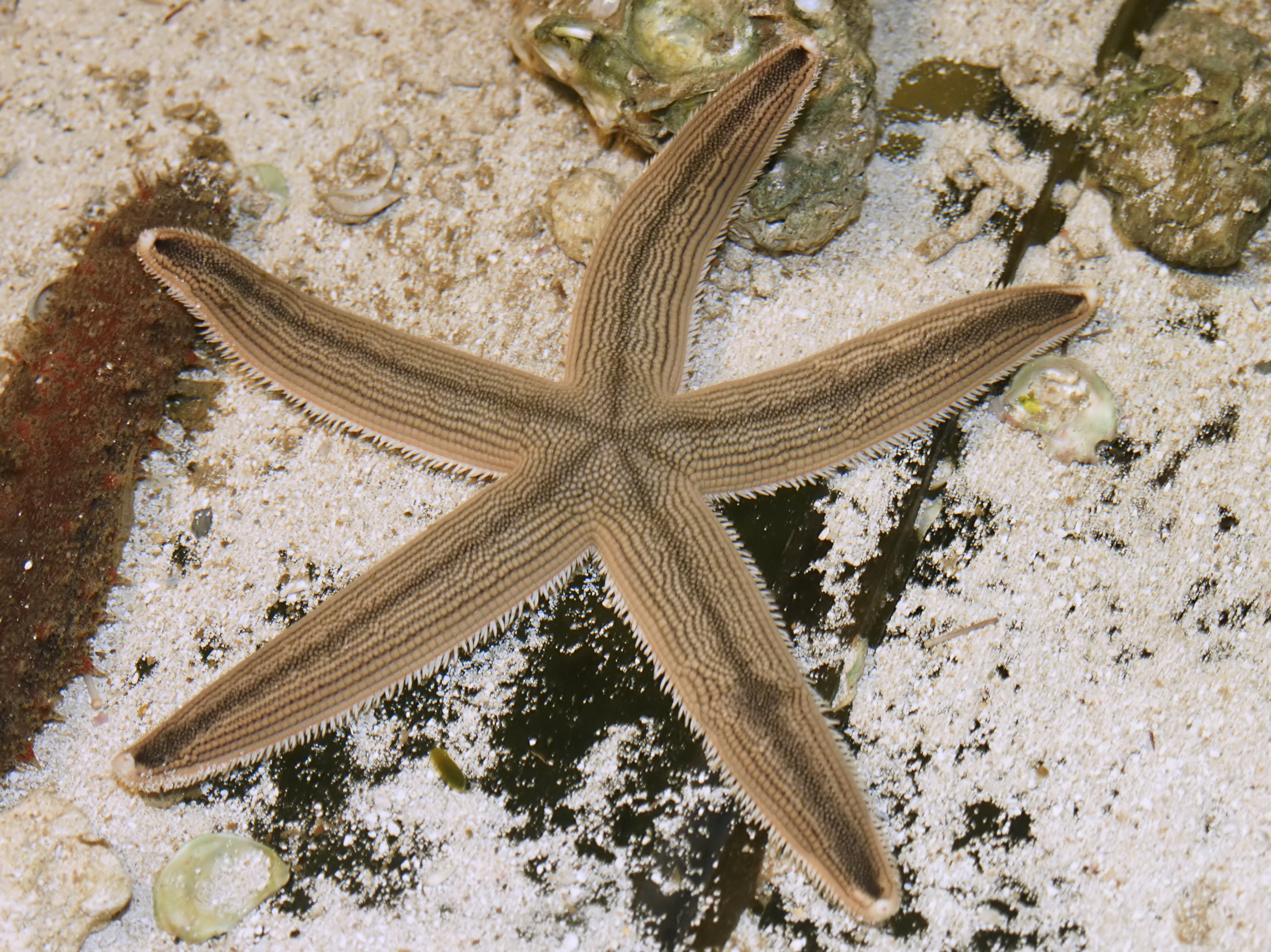
Luidia clathrata.

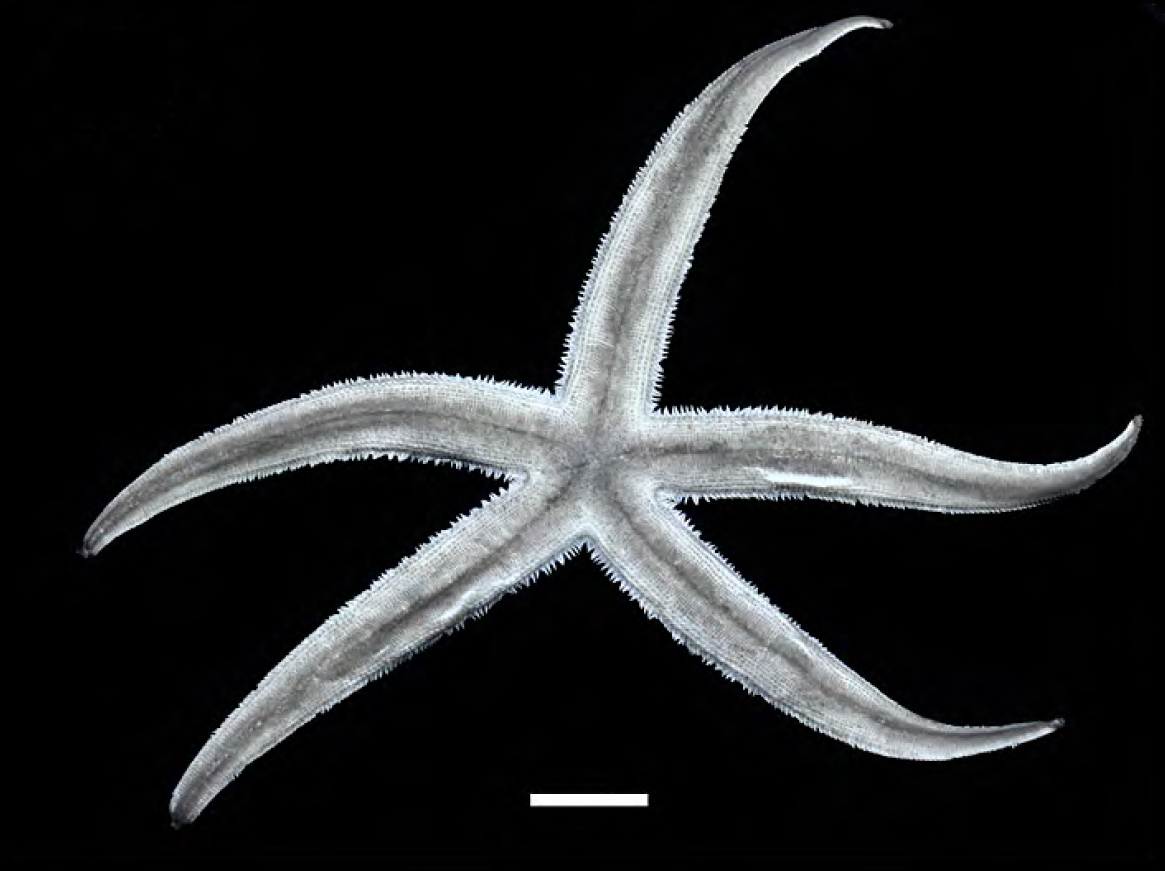
Luida columbia.

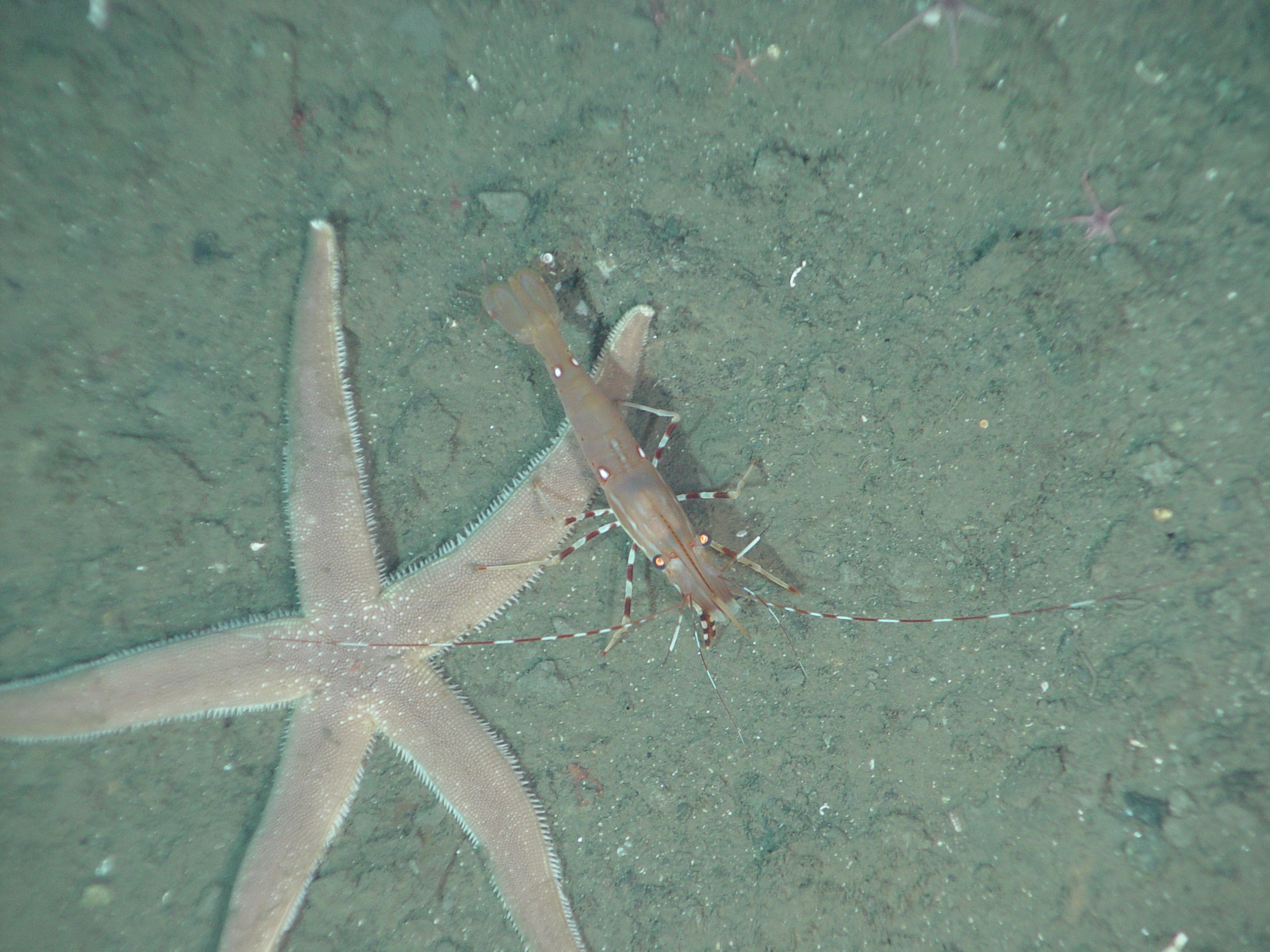
Luidia foliolata

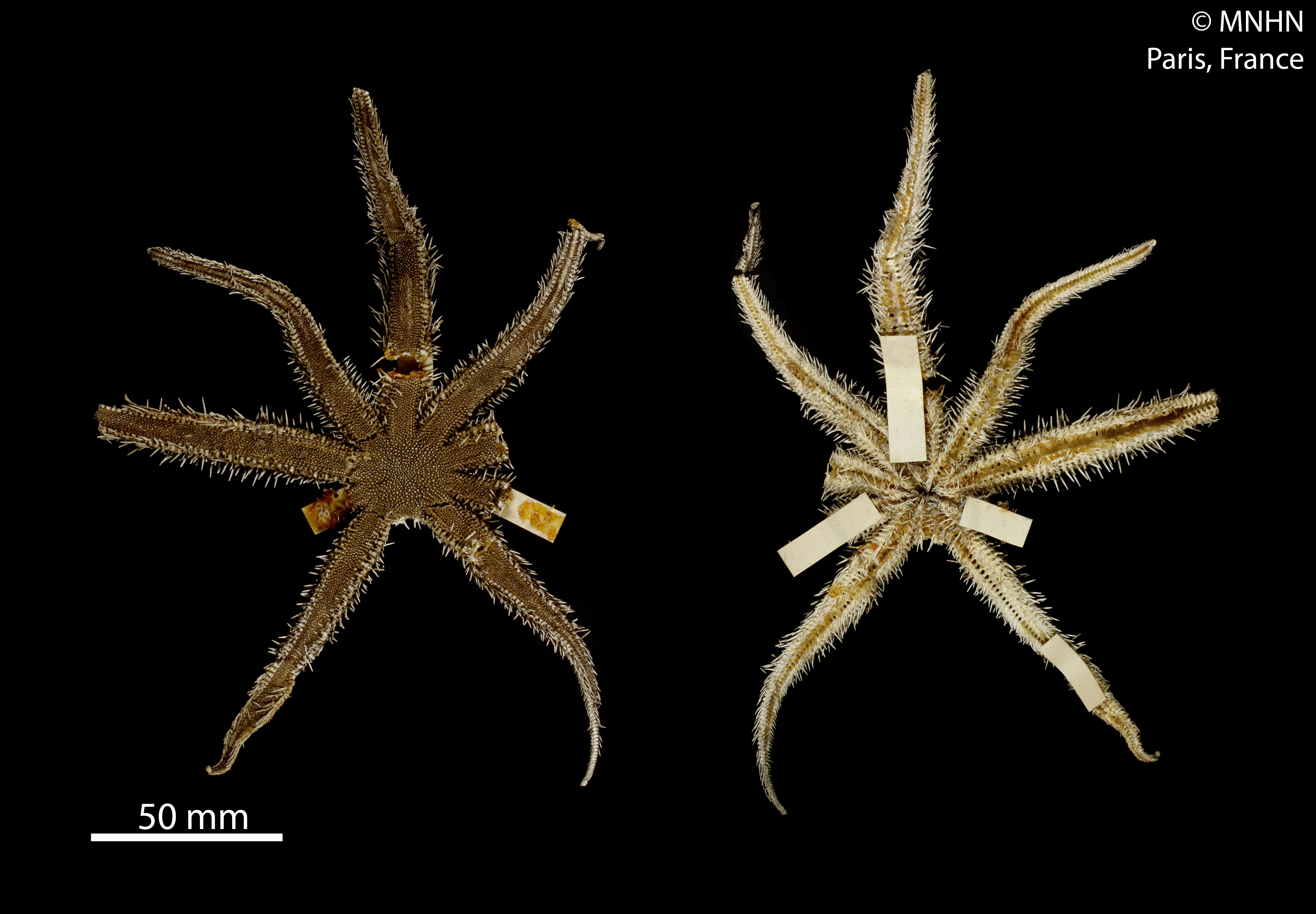
Luidia heterozona.

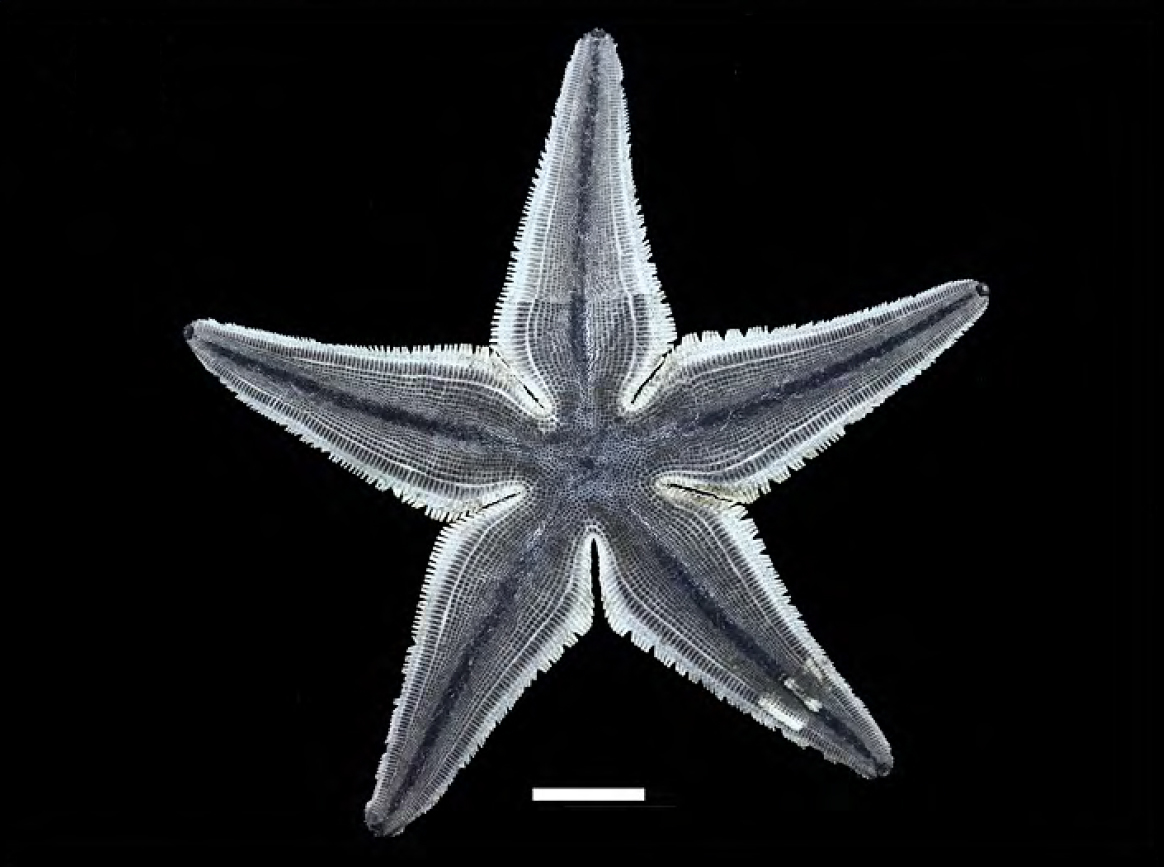
Luida latiradiata.

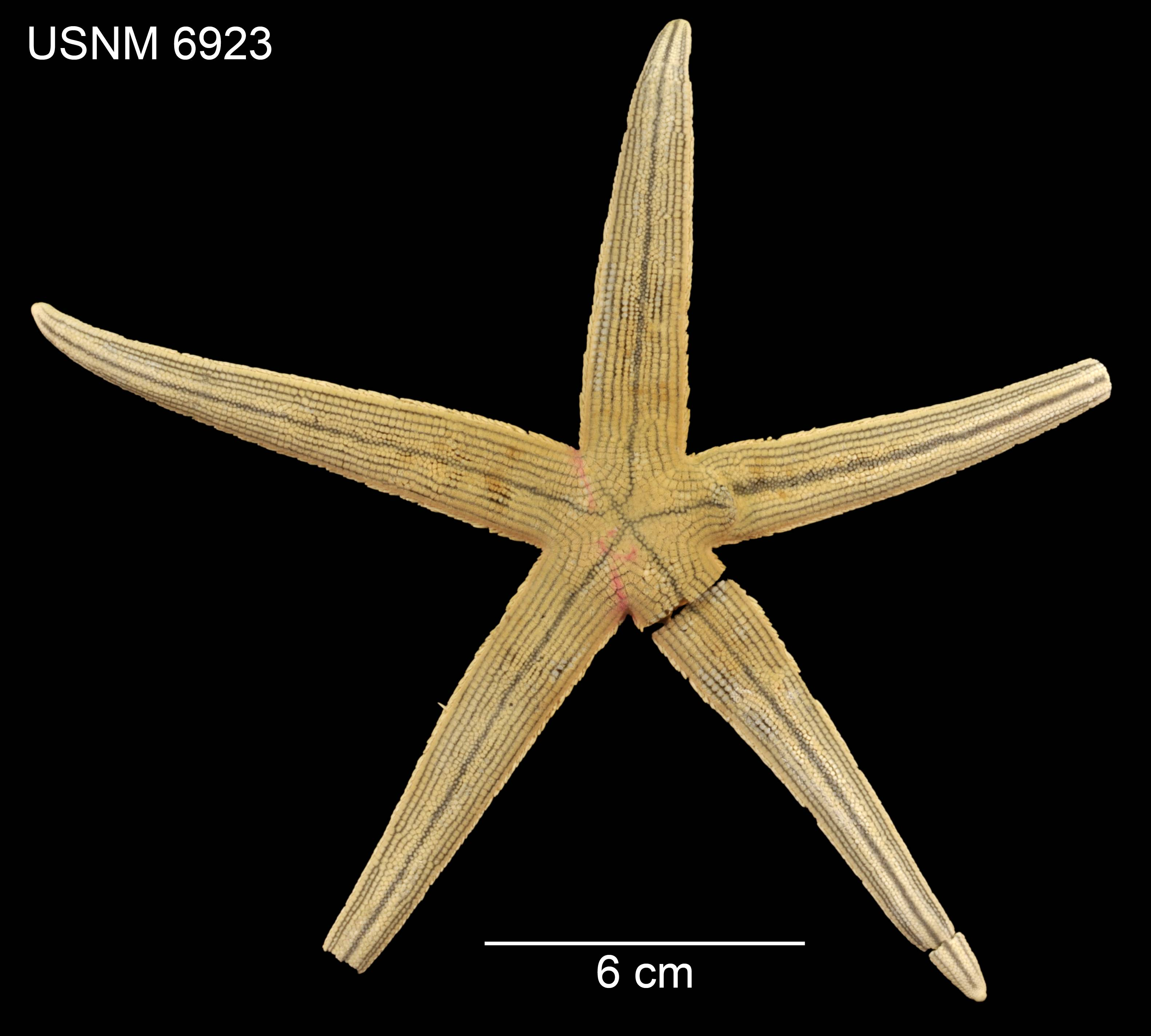
Luidia lawrencei.

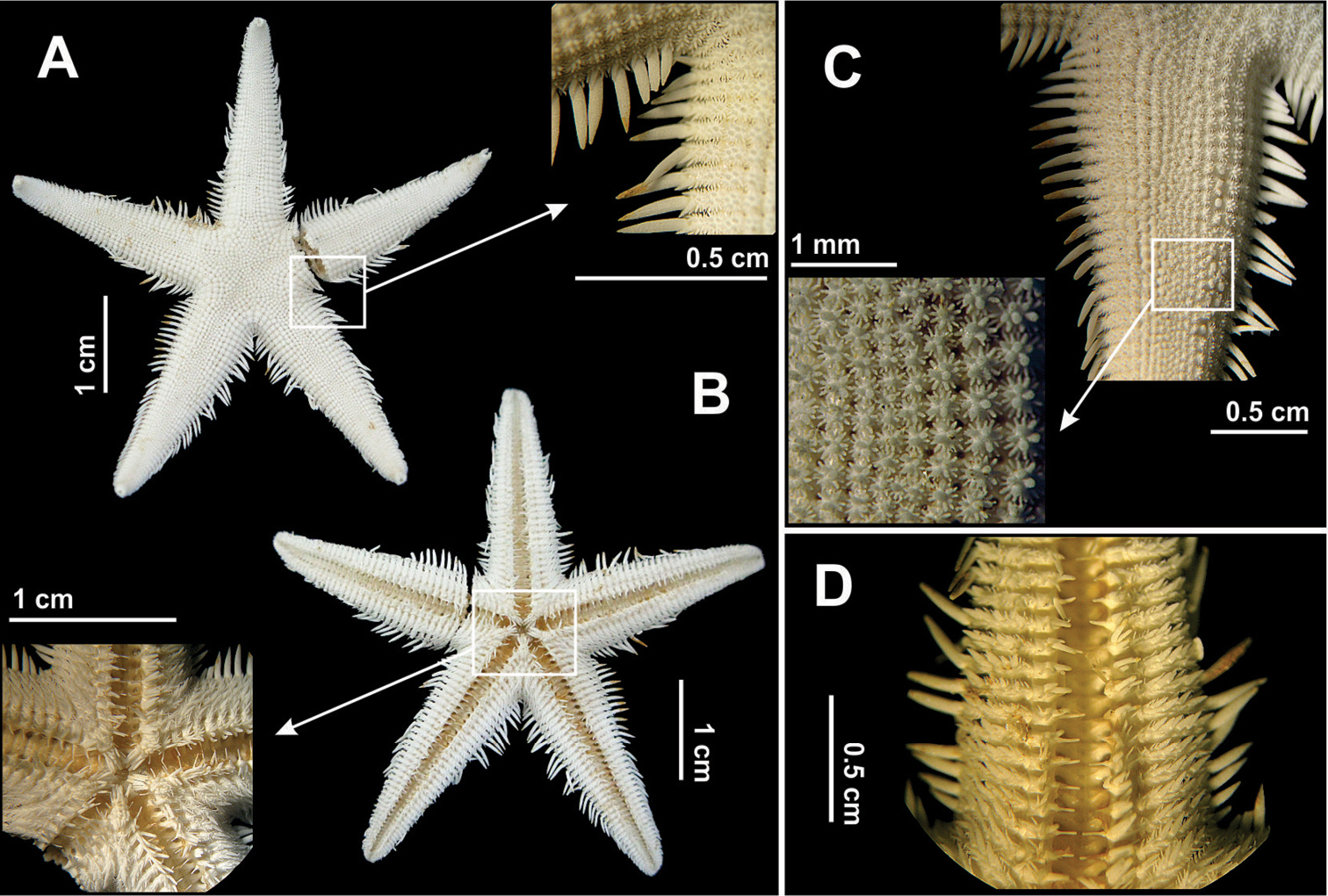
Luidia ludwigi.

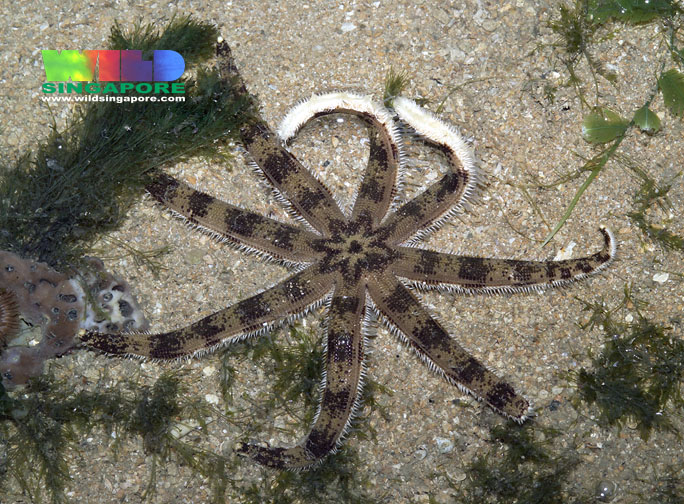
Luidia maculata.

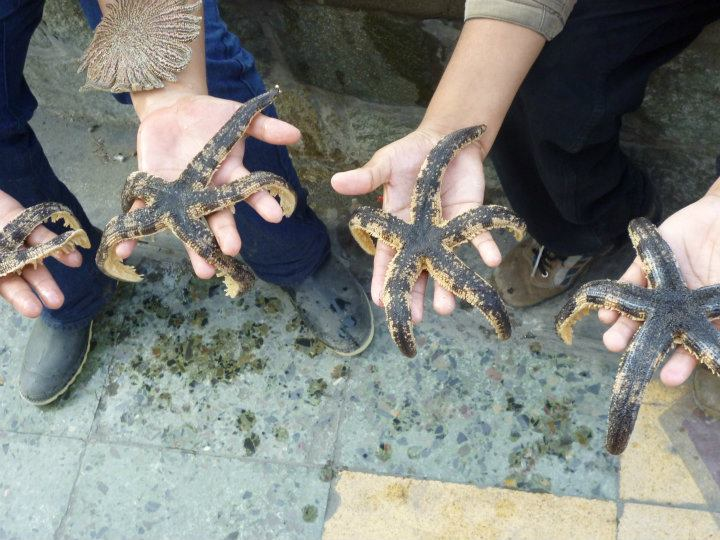
Luidia magellanica

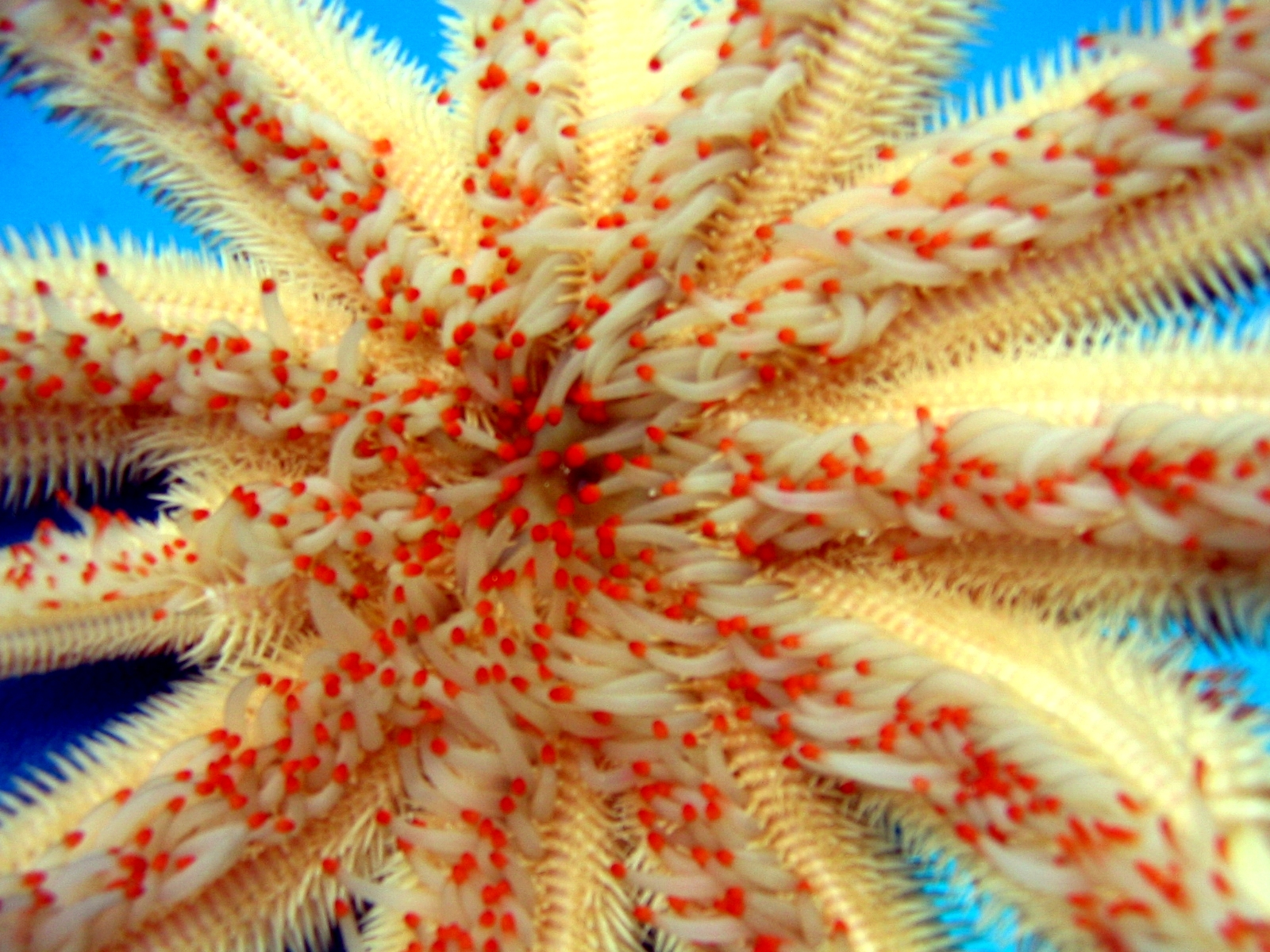
Luidia magnifica (oral face).

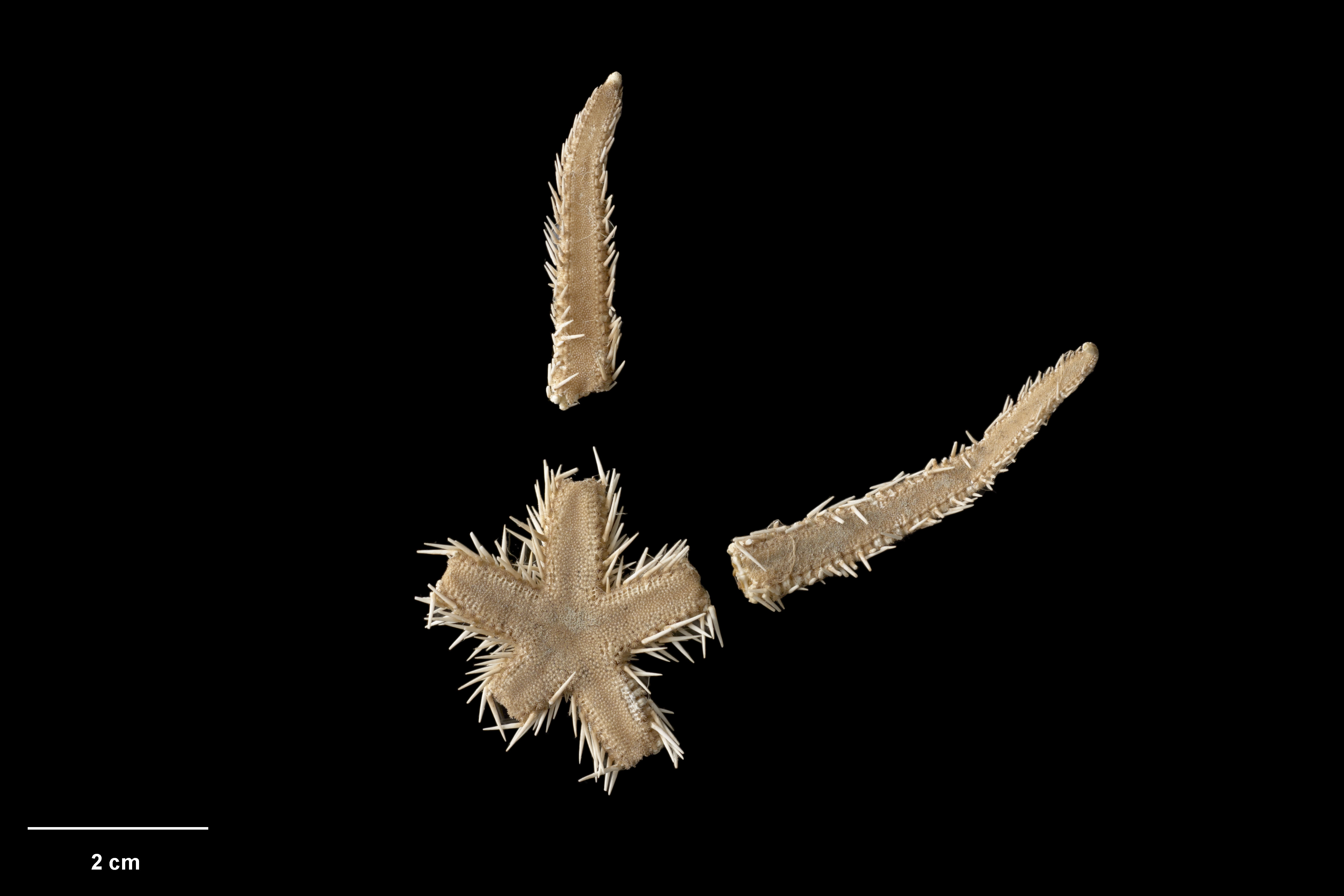
Luidia neozelanica

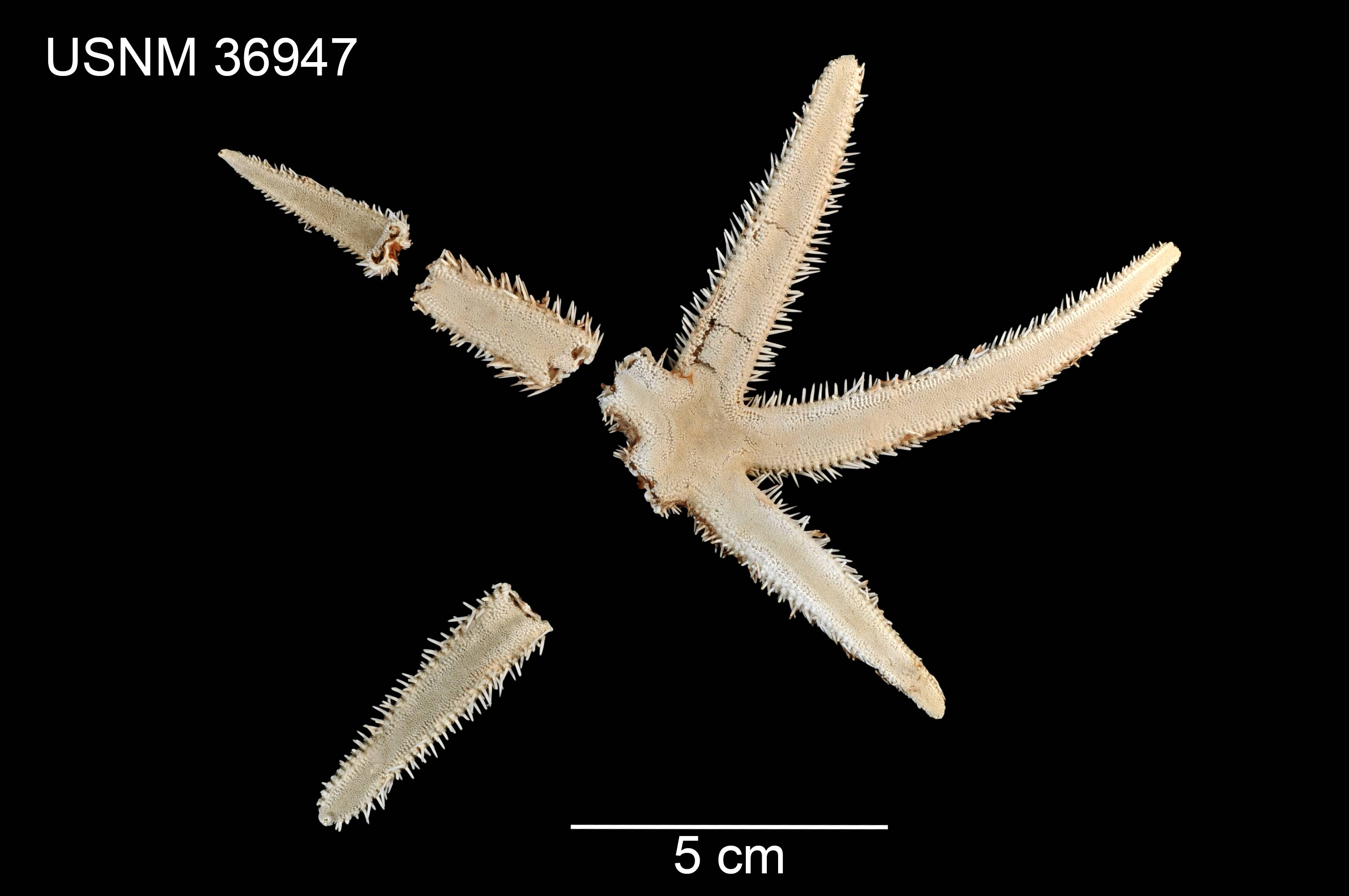
Luidia porteri.

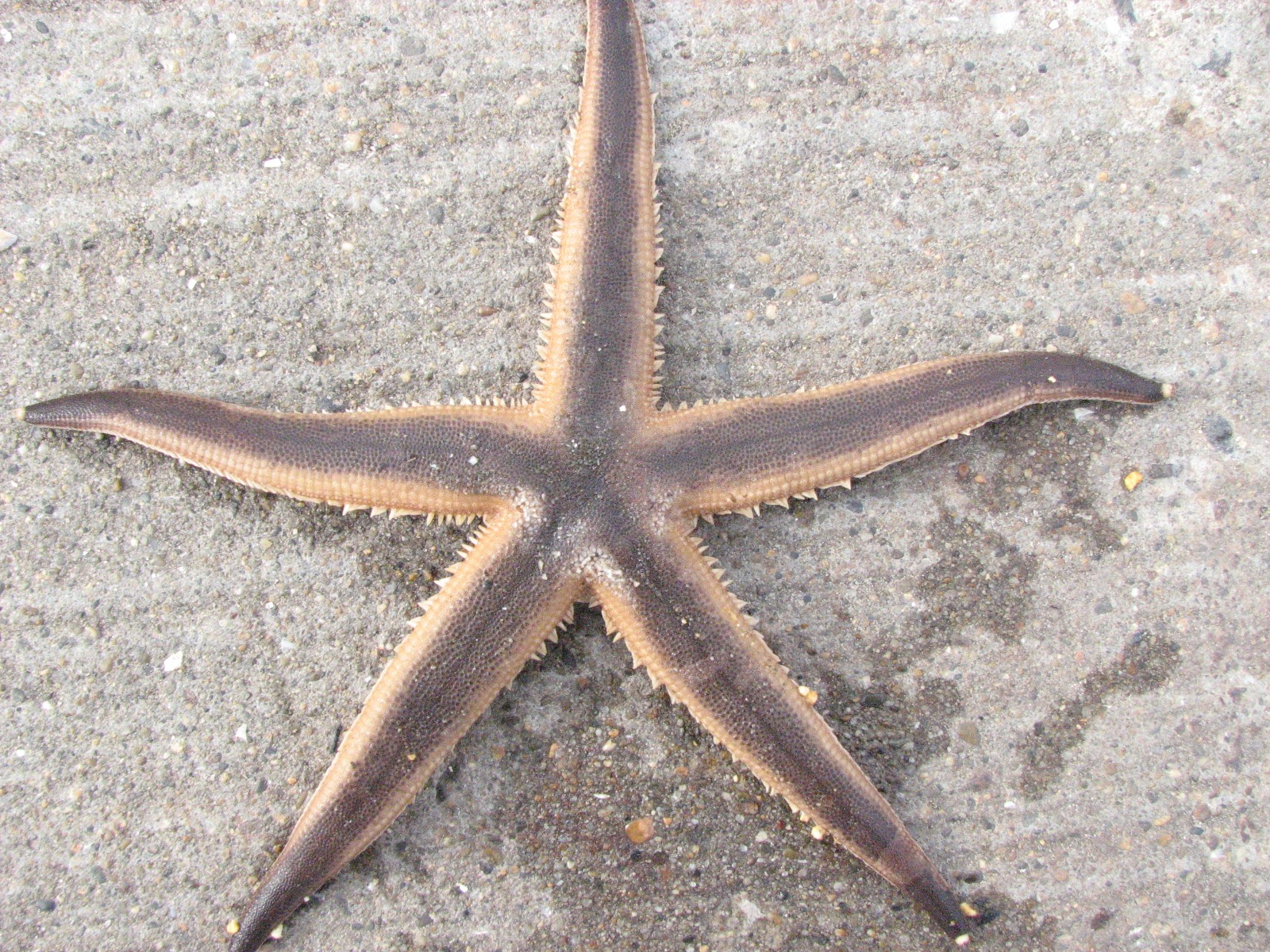
Luidia quinaria

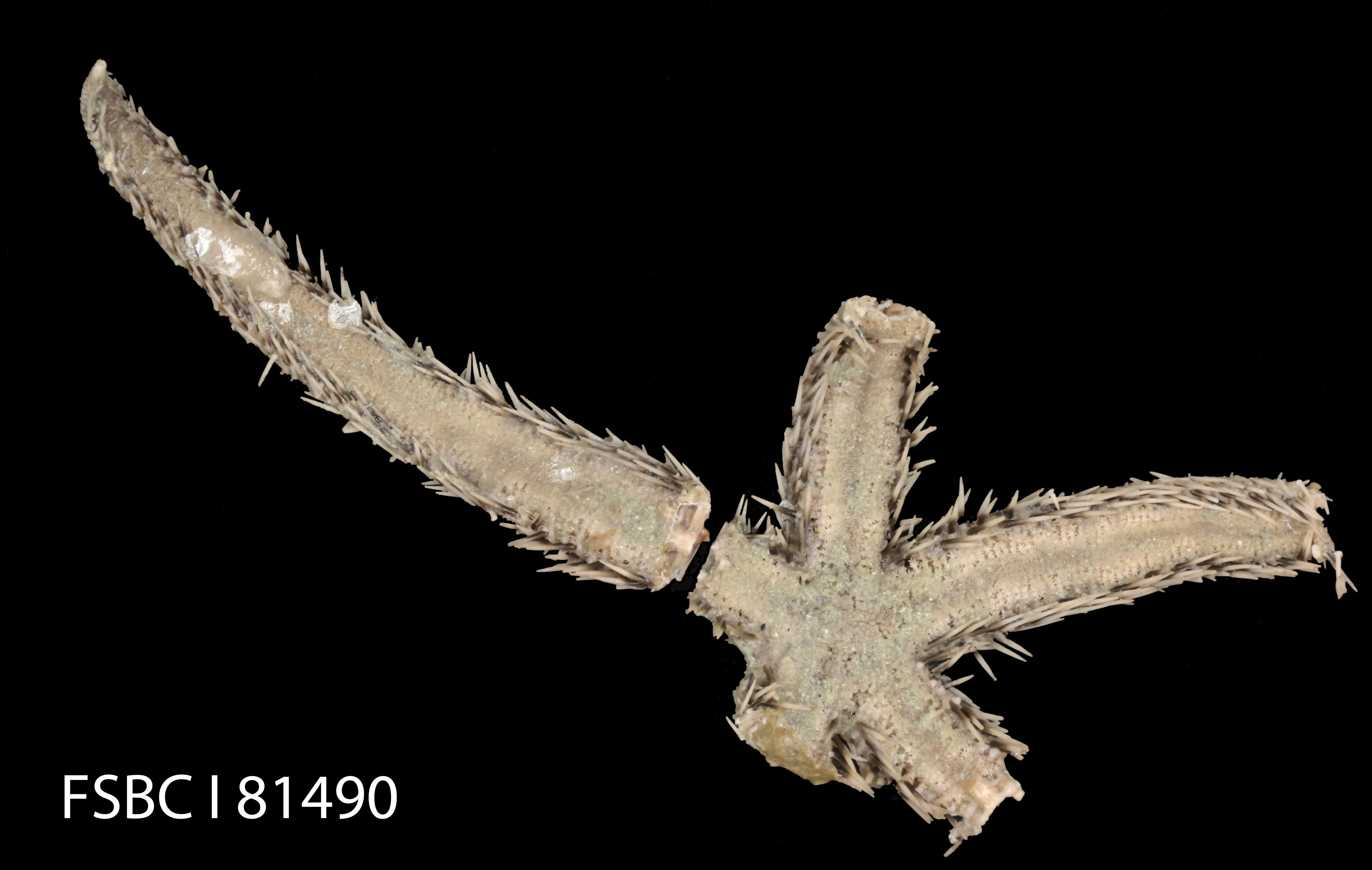
Luidia sagamina

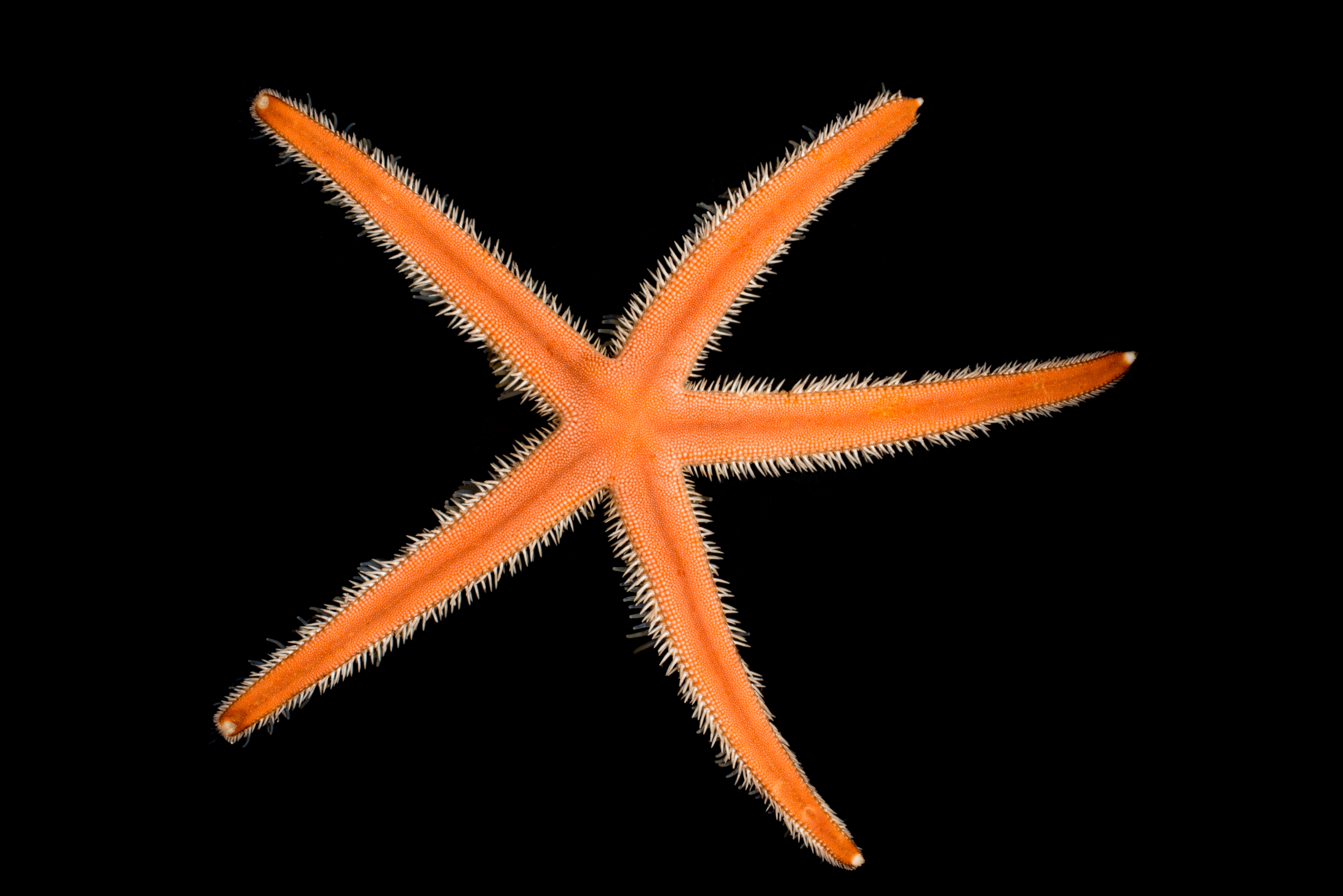
Luidia sarsi.

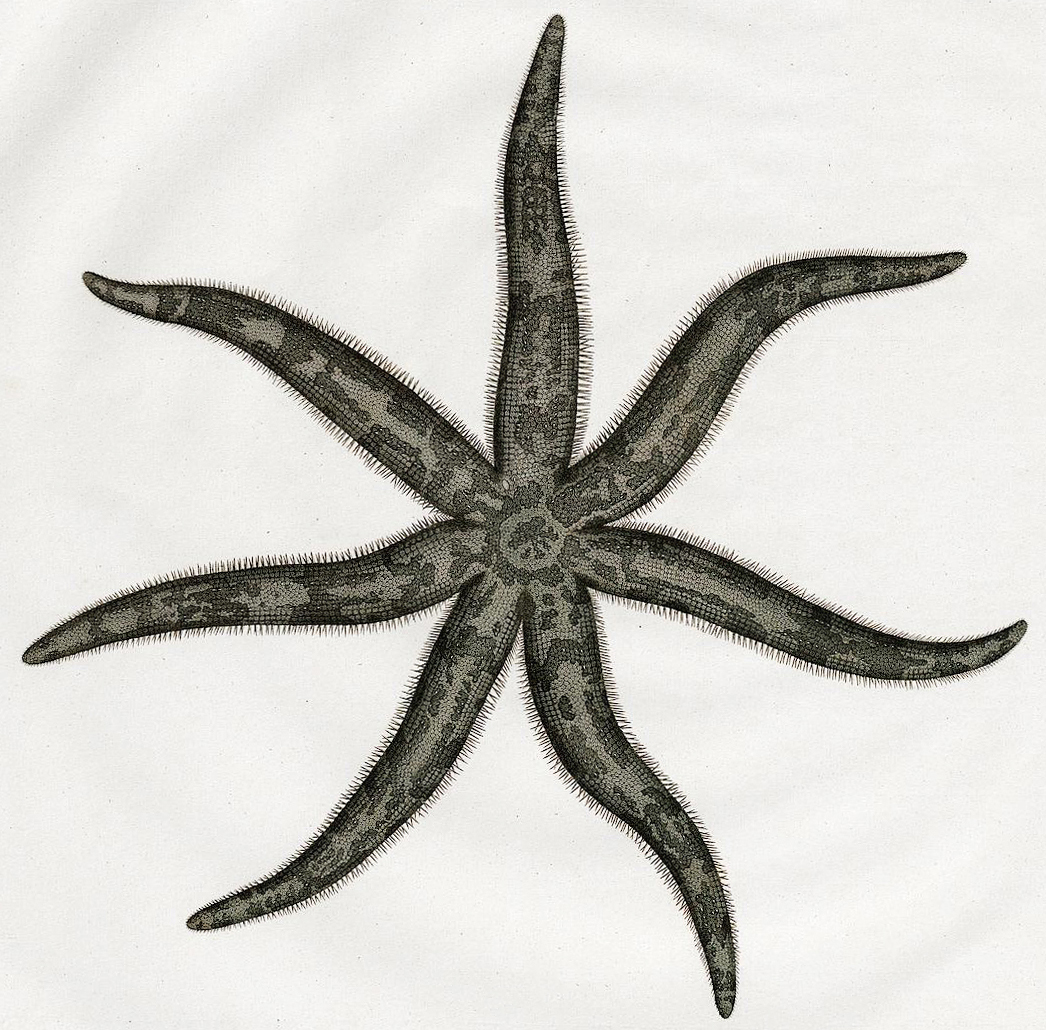
Luidia savignyi.

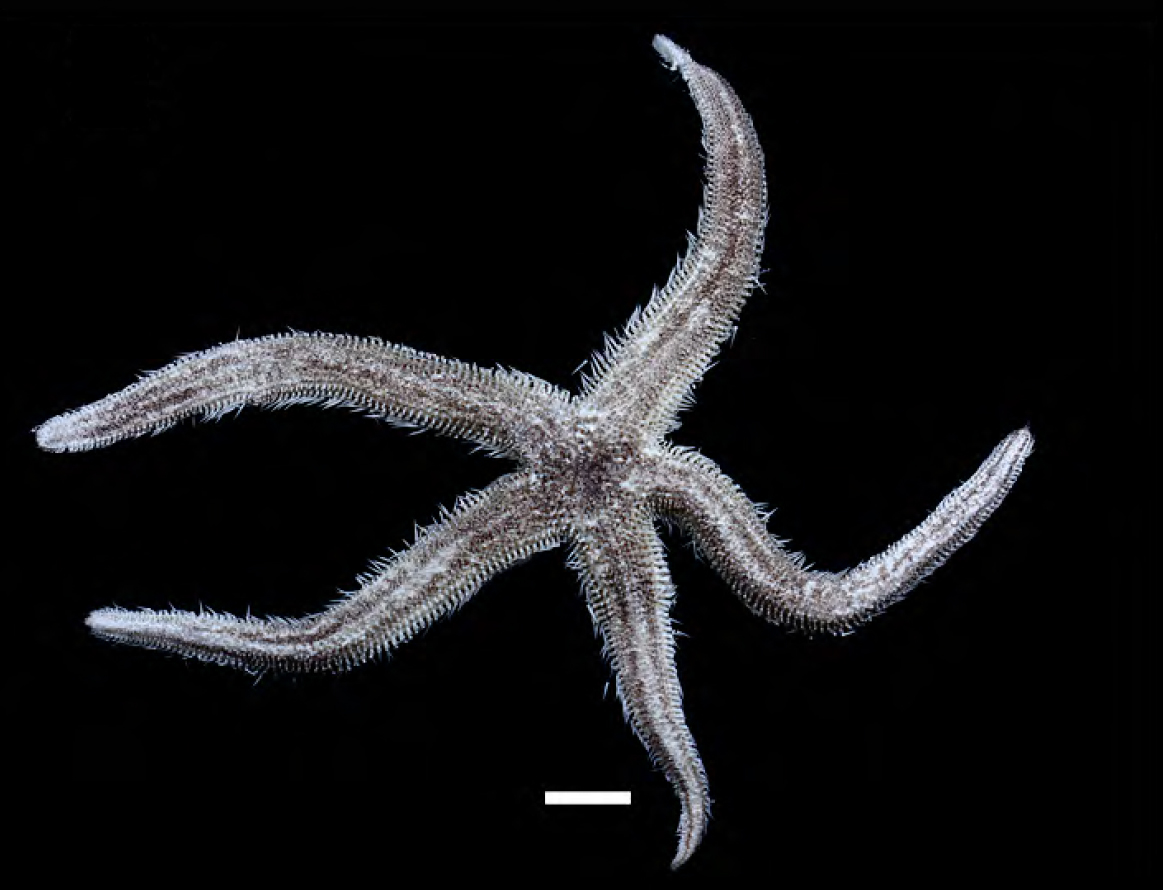
Luidia superba.
