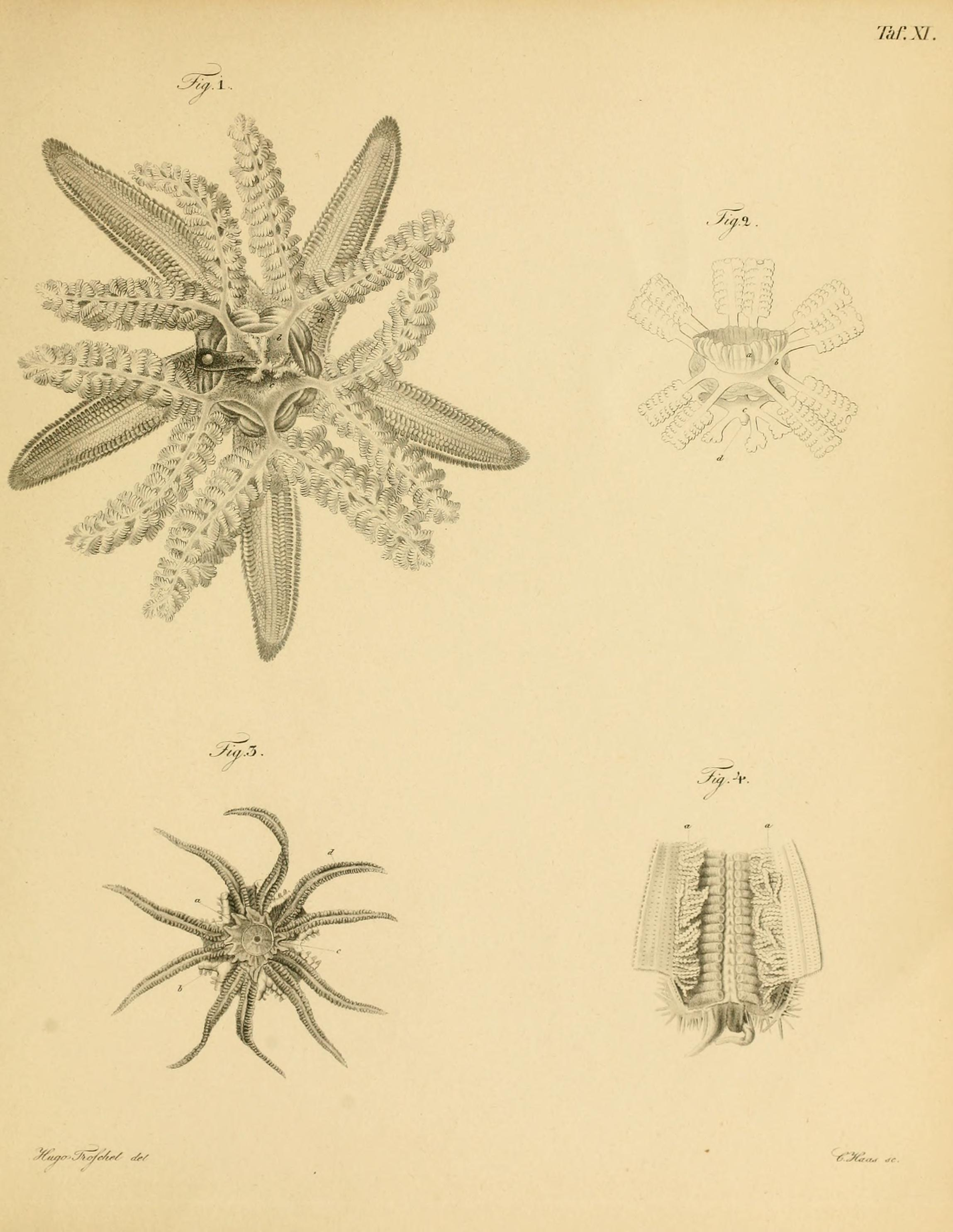

Scientific classification
- Domain: Eukaryota
- Kingdom: Animalia
- Phylum: Echinodermata
- Class: Asteroidea
- Order: Paxillosida
- Family: Luidiidae
- Genus: Luidia
- Species: L. savignyi

Binomial name
- Luidia savignyi (Audouin, 1826)

Synonyms
- Asterias savignyi Audouin, 1826

= Luidia savignyi =

Species of starfish

Luidia savignyi is a species of starfish belonging to the family Luidiidae. The species is found in the tropical and subtropical Indo-Pacific region. It is a large starfish and preys on other echinoderms.

== Description ==
Luidia savignyi is a large starfish, with the distance between the tips of extended arms sometimes reaching about 30 cm (12 in). There are usually six or seven slender arms with pointed tips attached to a relatively small central disc. The aboral (upper) surface is rough and granular, with numerous skeletal appendages known as paxillae. These are vertical columns tipped by clusters of tiny spines, often with a single larger orange spine in the centre. The colour of the aboral surface is very variable between individuals, being greyish with beige, burgundy, greenish or brownish spots and patches. On the oral surface, an ambulacral groove runs along each arm, terminating at the central mouth. This is lined on either side by tube feet tipped with suckers. The oral surface of the arms is clad with clawed pedicellaria, and a rim of large, thick spines grows on the margin between the aboral and oral surfaces.

== Distribution and habitat ==
Luidia savignyi is native to the tropical and subtropical Indo-Pacific region, its range extending from the Red Sea and East African coast to the Philippines and New Caledonia. Its typical habitat is uncompacted sandy-mud, but it also frequents rock slabs covered with coral rubble and algae. It is found at depths down to about 30 m (98 ft).

== Ecology ==
Luidia savignyi is largely nocturnal. It is able to move very quickly because of its long arms, and can bury itself efficiently in the sediment. It is a predator and feeds on sea urchins, irregular urchins and starfish, particularly Astropecten polyacanthus. It almost appears to run after its prey, and other species flee at its approach. It does not invaginate its stomach as many starfish do, but stretches its mouth wide and swallows its prey whole; the small disc becomes swollen and distorted after a large meal. When it attacks certain starfish such as Protoreaster nodosus and the small Nardoa gomophia, it soon abandons the potential prey. In contrast to the closely related Luidia maculata, no useful chemical substances have been discovered in the tissues of Luidia savignyi.
