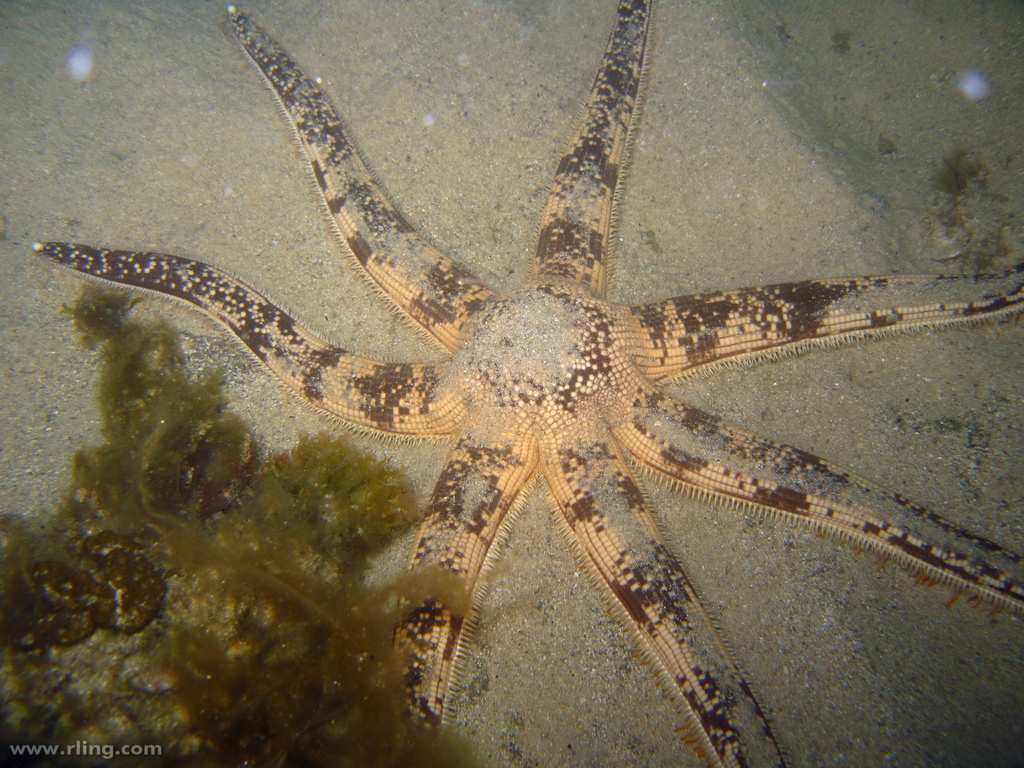

Scientific classification
- Kingdom: Animalia
- Phylum: Echinodermata
- Class: Asteroidea
- Order: Paxillosida
- Family: Luidiidae
- Genus: Luidia
- Species: L. australiae

Binomial name
- Luidia australiae Döderlein, 1920

= Luidia australiae =

Species of starfish

Luidia australiae, the southern sand star, is a species of starfish in the family Luidiidae. It is found in the Pacific Ocean around Australia and New Zealand.

== Description ==
Luidia australiae has a variable number of long, slim, tapering arms but seven is the most common number. The central disc and the arms are a dull yellow colour, irregularly blotched with dark green or black. It can grow to 40 centimetres (16 in) in diameter.

== Distribution and habitat ==
Luidia australiae is native to the waters around southern Australia. It is found on reefs, in seagrass meadows, and semi-buried in sand at depths of up to 110 metres (360 ft). It is sometimes washed ashore after storms. It is not found in New Zealand, but is frequently confused with Luidia maculata, a species with 6-9 arms and often similar colouration that is found in northern New Zealand and on the east coast of Australia.

== Biology ==
Luidia australiae is a carnivore and is often found half-buried in the sediment in seagrass beds where its colouring provides camouflage. It is likely to be an opportunist predator of macrofauna, and possibly also a scavenger.
