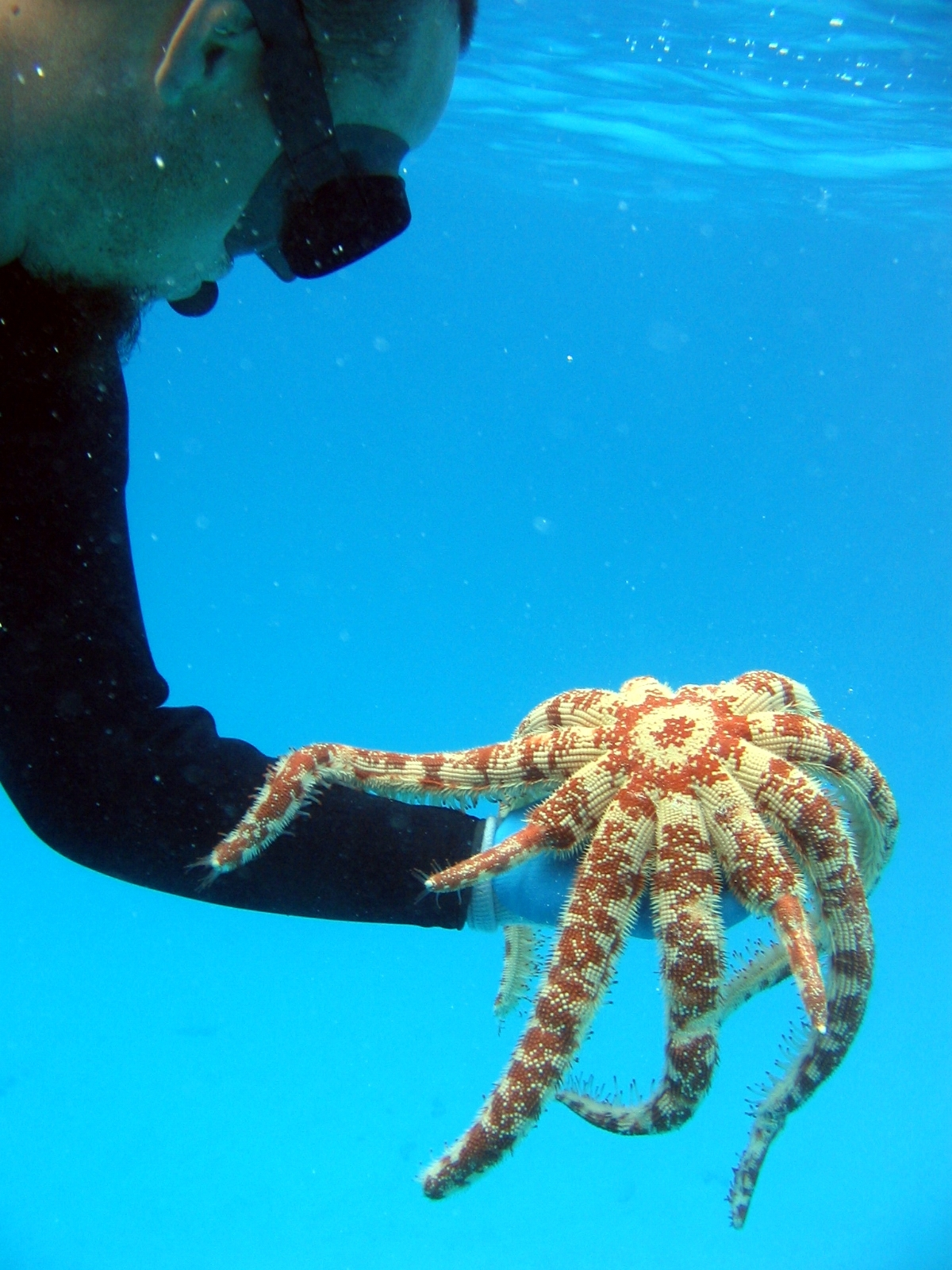

Scientific classification
- Kingdom: Animalia
- Phylum: Echinodermata
- Class: Asteroidea
- Order: Paxillosida
- Family: Luidiidae
- Genus: Luidia
- Species: L. magnifica

Binomial name
- Luidia magnifica Fisher, 1906

Synonyms
- Luidia aspera Sladen, 1889

= Luidia magnifica =

Magnificent star

Species of starfish

Luidia magnifica, the magnificent star, is a species of starfish in the family Luidiidae. It is found in the Pacific Ocean.

== Description ==
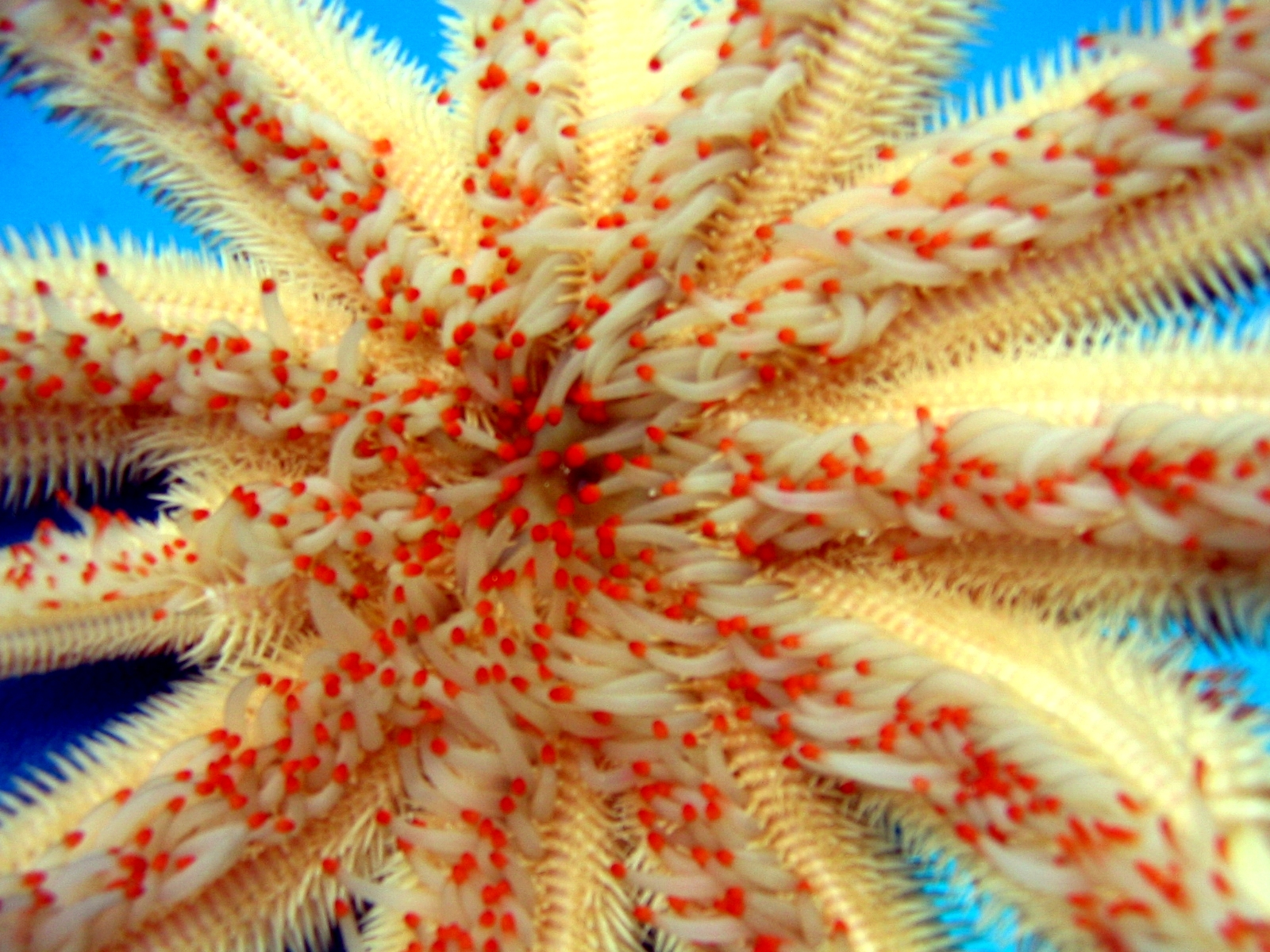
Underside of Luidia magnifica

The magnificent star usually has 10 long, tapering arms with pointed tips though there are occasionally 11 arms. One or more of these may be regenerating after being damaged or removed by a predator. The upper surface is covered with paxillae, pillar-like spines with truncated ends. There are also paxillae on the margins of the underside and multiple rows of tube feet running down the centre of each arm. The colour is variable, sometimes being creamy yellow with bands of red spots, but other specimens are darker in varying shades of brown and olive. The underside is usually creamy yellow and the tube feet are tipped with red.

The magnificent star can grow to a large size. One specimen on the Pearl and Hermes Atoll, Hawaii, was found to be 84 centimetres (33 in) in diameter.

== Distribution and habitat ==
The magnificent star is found on sandy areas of the seabed surrounding Hawaii and the Philippines at a depth of between 18 metres (59 ft) and 133 metres (436 ft).

== Biology ==
Like other members of the genus Luidia, the magnificent star is likely to be an opportunist predator of macrofauna and possibly also a scavenger. Other related species favour a diet of bivalve molluscs and echinoids. The magnificent star can move rapidly, appearing to glide across the sandy seabed. It swallows large items of food whole, digesting them in its two stomachs and further processing the remains in the pyloric caeca in the base of its arms. It then ejects any undigested material through its anus.

== See also ==
- Asteroidea
- Eleven-armed sea star
