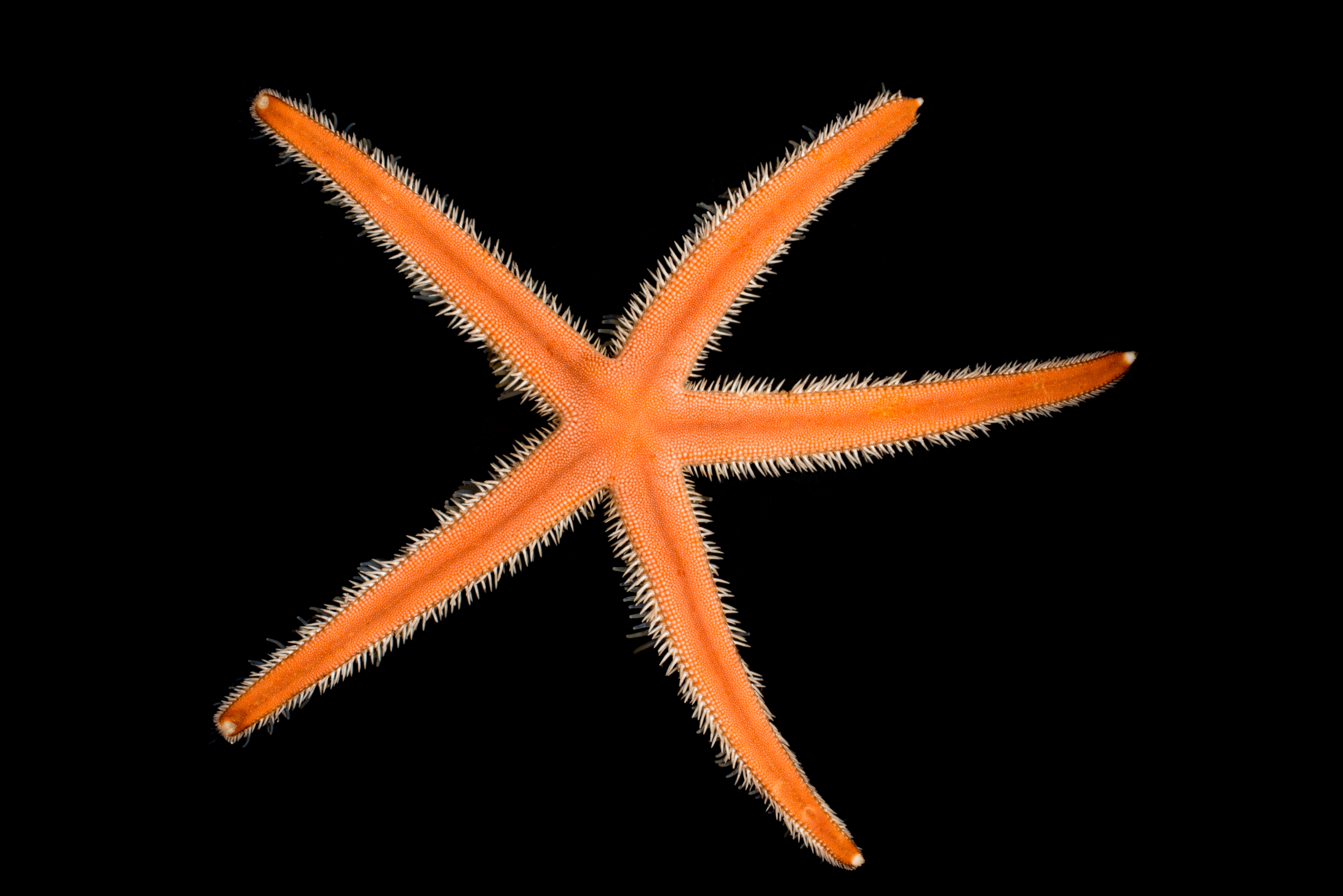

Scientific classification
- Kingdom: Animalia
- Phylum: Echinodermata
- Class: Asteroidea
- Order: Paxillosida
- Family: Luidiidae
- Genus: Luidia
- Species: L. sarsii

Binomial name
- Luidia sarsii Düben & Koren, 1846

= Luidia sarsii =

Species of starfish

Luidia sarsii is a species of starfish. Sand colored with a velvety texture, the species expresses pentamerism or pentaradial symmetry as adults. The five gently tapering arms have conspicuous bands of long white marginal spines in groups of three. Luidia sarsi grow to approximately 20 cm across and are found in deeper water (20 m+) from Norway to the Mediterranean but in deep colder water in the south. They are usually found on muddy sediment and are most active at night, burying themselves under the sand during the day. Luidia sarsii larva develop from a fertilized egg and are unique in a number of respects. The larva of the species attains an unusual size (up to 35 mm) and a juvenile starfish develops inside the larva. During metamorphosis the juvenile migrates to the outside and detaches from the swimming larval bipinnaria stage. The larva continues to live separately for several months.
