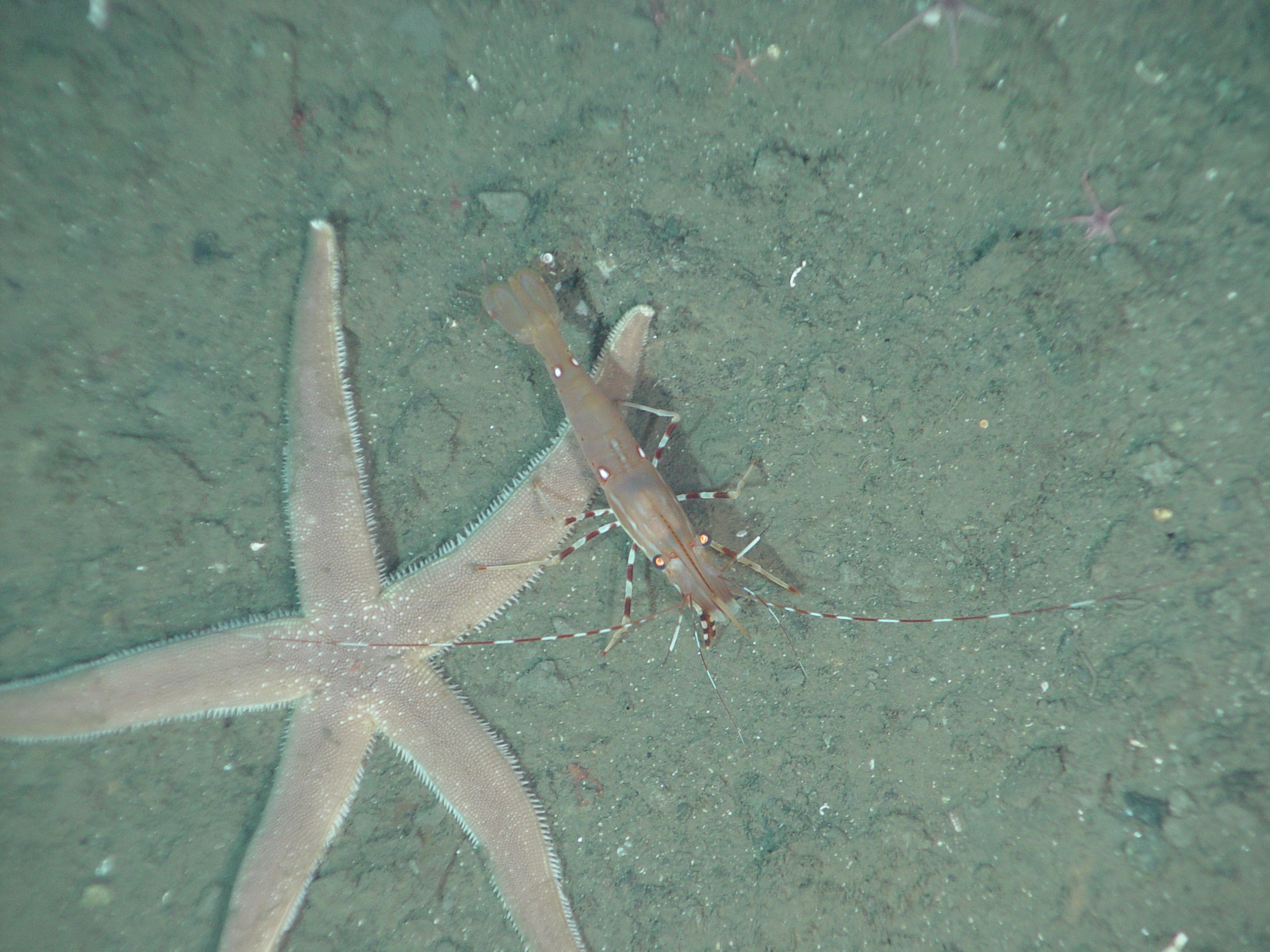
- Sand star (left) and shrimp (right)

Scientific classification
- Kingdom: Animalia
- Phylum: Echinodermata
- Class: Asteroidea
- Order: Paxillosida
- Family: Luidiidae
- Genus: Luidia
- Species: L. foliolata

Binomial name
- Luidia foliolata (Grube, 1866)

= Luidia foliolata =

Species of starfish

Luidia foliolata, the sand star, is a species of starfish in the family Luidiidae found in the northeastern Pacific Ocean on sandy and muddy seabeds at depths to about 600 m (2,000 ft).

== Description ==
The sand star has a small disc and five long, flattened arms with tapering tips. It can grow to a diameter of 40 cm (16 in), and is a grey, greenish-grey, or pale brown colour, sometimes speckled with white. The arms have rows of large marginal plates, each with several spines, but these are not visible from the aboral (upper) side. The tube feet have no suckers, but instead end with blunt points. The sand star could be confused with Astropecten verrilli, but in that species, the large marginal plates are visible from above. This starfish seems to be easily damaged, and often breaks in pieces if raised from the seabed by trawling. Even when brought up intact, it often has missing or regenerating arms, perhaps the result of attacks by predatory crabs or fish.

== Distribution ==
The sand star is found at depths to 600 m (2,000 ft) on soft substrates in the northeastern Pacific Ocean, with a range extending from Alaska to the Galapagos Islands and Nicaragua.

== Behaviour ==
The sand star is well-camouflaged on the sandy and muddy seabeds where it is found, and is often half-covered with sediment. It can create a shallow depression and work its way under the bivalve molluscs, polychaete worms, brittle stars, and sea cucumbers on which it feeds. Unlike some other starfish, it cannot evert its stomach, so is limited to smaller-sized prey. It is agile, and can right itself rapidly if turned upside down. The long, pointed tube feet are specially adapted for movement over soft sediments, but lose traction if the sand star tries to scale steeply sloping rocks. It is a fast traveller, and can move across the seabed at the rate of 280 centimetres (110 in) per minute, many times faster than slow species such as the leather star (Dermasterias imbricata), which can only traverse 15 cm (5.9 in) in a minute.
