= Paxilla (ossicle) =

A paxilla (plural. paxillae) is a small umbrella-shaped structure sometimes found on Echinoderms, particularly in starfish (class Asteroidea) such as Luidia, Astropecten and Goniaster that immerse themselves in sediment. They are ossicles composed of calcite microcrystals found on the aboral (upper) surface of the animal. Their stalks emerge from the body wall and their umbrella-like crowns, each fringed with short spines, meet edge-to-edge forming a protective external false skin. The water-filled cavity beneath contains the madreporite and delicate gill structures known as papullae.
