= List of prehistoric starfish genera =

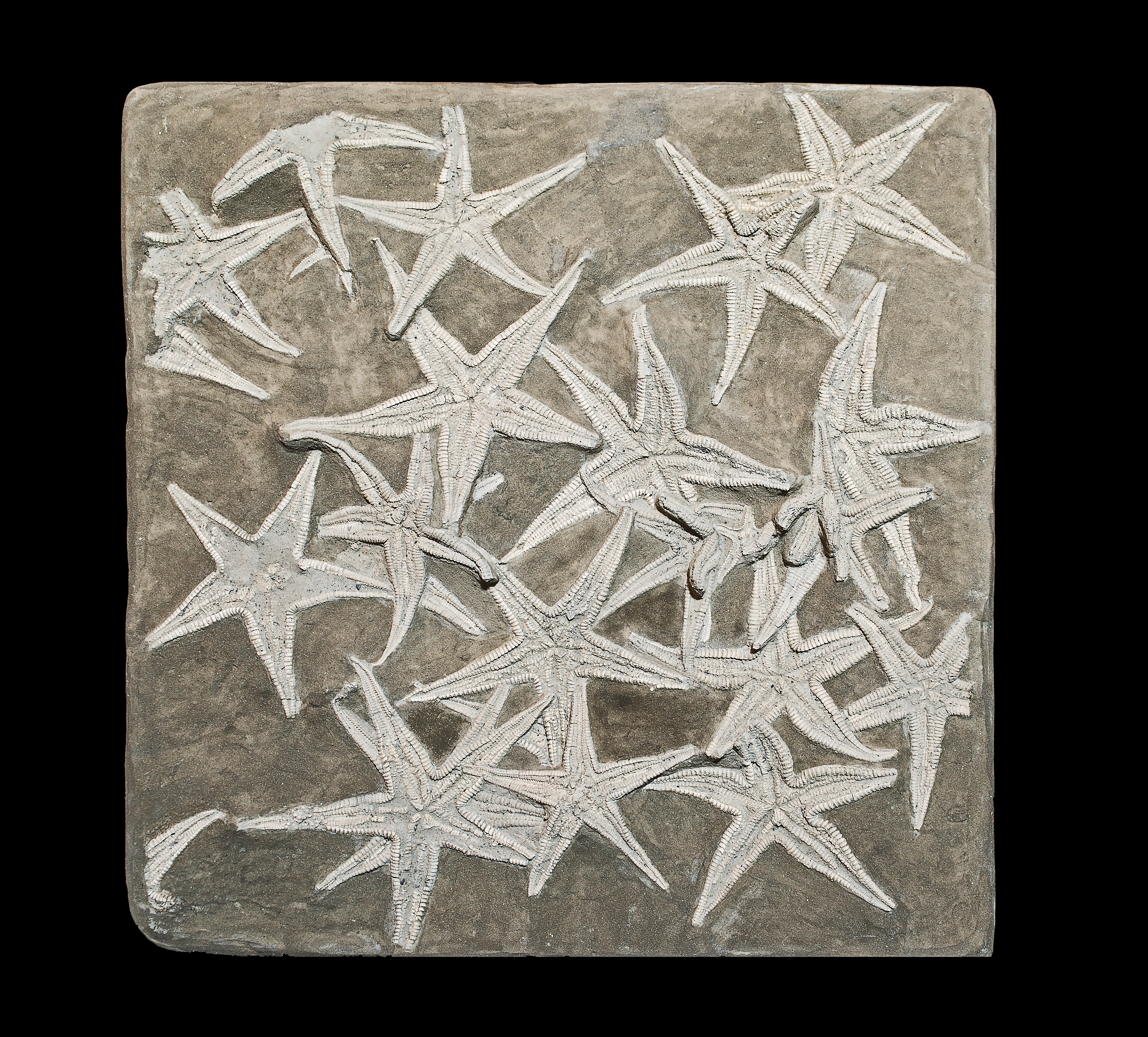
Astropecten

This list of prehistoric starfish is an attempt to create a comprehensive listing of all genera from the fossil record that have ever been considered to be in the class Asteroidea, excluding purely vernacular terms. The list includes all commonly accepted genera, but also genera that are now considered invalid, doubtful (nomina dubia), or were not formally published (nomina nuda), as well as junior synonyms of more established names, and genera that are no longer considered starfish.

== Naming conventions and terminology ==
Naming conventions and terminology follow the International Code of Zoological Nomenclature. Technical terms used include:

- Junior synonym: A name which describes the same taxon as a previously published name. If two or more genera are formally designated and the type specimens are later assigned to the same genus, the first to be published (in chronological order) is the senior synonym, and all other instances are junior synonyms. Senior synonyms are generally used, except by special decision of the ICZN, but junior synonyms cannot be used again, even if deprecated. Junior synonymy is often subjective, unless the genera described were both based on the same type specimen.
- Nomen nudum (Latin for "naked name"): A name that has appeared in print but has not yet been formally published by the standards of the ICZN. Nomina nuda (the plural form) are invalid, and are therefore not italicized as a proper generic name would be. If the name is later formally published, that name is no longer a nomen nudum and will be italicized on this list. Often, the formally published name will differ from any nomina nuda that describe the same specimen.
- Nomen oblitum (Latin for "forgotten name"): A name that has not been used in the scientific community for more than fifty years after its original proposal.
- Preoccupied name: A name that is formally published, but which has already been used for another taxon. This second use is invalid (as are all subsequent uses) and the name must be replaced. As preoccupied names are not valid generic names, they will also go unitalicized on this list.
- Nomen dubium (Latin for "dubious name"): A name describing a fossil with no unique diagnostic features. As this can be an extremely subjective and controversial designation, this term is not used on this list.

== Starfish ==
Genus	Authors	Year	Status	Age	Location(s)	Notes
Advenaster	Hess	1955	Valid	Late Bajocian to Late Callovian	Switzerland, Poland	
Afraster						
Agalmaster						
Albebarania						
Alkaida						
Altairia						
Anorthaster						
Archaster						
Argoviaster						
Arisaigaster						
Arkonaster						
Arthraster						
Aspidaster						
Asterias	Linnaeus	1758	Valid			
Astropecten	Gray	1840	Valid			
Australaster						
Baliactis						
Benthopecten						
Betelgeusia						
Bohemaster						
Brachisolaster						
Brisingella						
Caletaster						
Calliaster						
Calliasterella						
Calliderma						
Calyptactis						
Capellia						
Cenomanaster						
Ceramaster						
Certonardoa						
Chaetasterina						
Chariaster						
Chomataster						
Clarkeaster						
Cnemidactis						
Coccaster						
Compsaster						
Comptonia			Preoccupied			Name preoccupied by genus of fern.
Cottreauaster						
Crateraster						
Ctenophoraster						
Cuneaster						
Denebia						
Dermaster						
Devonaster						
Devonistella						
Diclidaster						
Echinaster						
Echinasterella						
Eoactis						
Eokainaster						
Eostella						
Fayoumaster						
Foliaster						
Fomalhautia						
Forbesiaster						
Germanasterias						
Girvanaster						
Hadranderaster						
Helianthaster						
Heliaster						
Henricia						
Hippasteria						
Hudsonaster						
Hunsrueckaster						
Hystrigaster						
Hystriyasterias						
Illusioluidia						
Indiaster						
Kyraster						
Lacertasterias						
Lambertella			Preoccupied			Name preoccupied by genus of fungi.
Lanthanaster						
Lepidactis						
Lepidaster						
Lepidasterella						
Leptogonium						
Lepyriactis						
Linckia	Nardo	1834	Valid			Named for Johann Heinrich Linck
Lophaster						
Lophidiaster						
Luidia						
Macroporaster						
Mastaster						
Mediaster						
Mesopalaeaster						
Mesotremaster						
Metopaster	Sladen	1893	Valid	Late Cretaceous to Early Eocene		
Miopentagonaster						
Mistia						
Monaster						
Nehalemia						
Neopalaeaster						
Noviaster						
Nymphaster						
Odontaster						
Ophryaster						
Palaeaster						
Palaeosolaster						
Palaeostella						
Palasterina						
Palasteriscus						
Paleoctenodiscus						
Paragonaster						
Pegaster						
Pentasteria	Valette	1929	Valid	Early Jurassic to Early Cretaceous		
Permaster						
Petraster						
Phillipaster						
Phocidaster						
Platanaster						
Plesiastropecten						
Plesioastropecten						
Plumaster						
Promopalaeaster						
Protarthraster						
Protopalaeaster						
Protothyraster						
Protremaster						
Pseudarchaster						
Pycinaster						
Recurvaster						
Rhenaster						
Salteraster						
Schondorfia						
Schuchertia						
Sclerasterias						
Siluraster						
Sladenia						
Solaster						
Spaniaster						
Spenceraster						
Spenceria						
Sphaeriaster						
Sphaeriodiscus						
Stauranderaster	Spencer	1907	Valid	Late Jurassic to Paleocene		
Stibaraster						
Sucia						
Taeniactis						
Teichaster						
Terminaster						
Tesselaster						
Testudinaster						
Tethyaster						
Trichasteropsis						
Trimeraster						
Tropidaster	Forbes	1850	Valid	Early Jurassic		
Tylasteria						
Ulrichaster						
Urasterella	McCoy	1851	Valid	Ordovician to Devonian.		
Valettaster						
Xandarosaster						
Xenaster						
Yarravaster						
Zoroaster						Named for Zoroaster, the founder of a namesake religion.

== See also ==
- List of prehistoric brittle stars
- List of prehistoric sea cucumbers
- List of crinoid genera
