= Trophodiscus almus =

Scientific classification
- Kingdom: Animalia
- Phylum: Echinodermata
- Class: Asteroidea
- Order: Paxillosida
- Family: Astropectinidae
- Genus: Trophodiscus
- Species: T. almus

Binomial name
- Trophodiscus almus Fisher, 1917

Species of starfish

Trophodiscus almus is a species of starfish in the family Astropectinidae. It is found in fairly deep waters in the Sea of Okhotsk, the Sea of Japan and around the Japanese island of Hokkaido. It is very unusual among starfish in that it broods its young on its upper surface. Its common name in Japanese is "Komochi-momiji".

== Description ==
Trophodiscus almus is a five-armed pentagonal starfish growing to a diameter of about 33 mm (1.3 in). It has a wide disc and short, bluntly pointed arms. The aboral (upper) surface is slightly convex and is covered in paxillae, umbrella-shaped structures with spiny margins. The paxillae are larger near the inter-arm areas and smaller at the centre of the disc and near the arm-tips. The madreporite is about halfway from the centre of the disc to the margin, the anus is small, and there are respiratory structures known as papulae between and concealed by the paxillae. A notable feature are the 13 to 20 large calcareous plates, wider than they are long, that extend around the margins of each arm. There seem to be two different colour forms of this starfish. Some individuals have a bright red or orange-red aboral surface and a paler, reddish-brown oral (under) surface. Other individuals have a yellowish-green aboral surface and yellowish-brown oral surface. In both cases, the superomarginal plates are paler and contrast with the other parts.

== Distribution ==
Trophodiscus almus was thought to be endemic to the Sea of Okhotsk from where it was first described by the American zoologist Walter K. Fisher in 1917 from material collected by the marine research vessel USS Albatross (1882). More recently it has been discovered in the Sea of Japan and the waters around Hokkaido. Its depth range is 150 to 300 m (492 to 984 ft) and it is fairly uncommon. In the Sea of Japan it is found on muddy sand bottoms where the water temperature is 1.5 °C (34.7 °F).

== Biology ==
Juvenile starfish of this species are brooded on the aboral surface of the female between the paxillae. Up to sixteen young have been found on one adult, the juveniles being either reddish-orange or greyish-green. The colour of the offspring does not always coincide with that of the parent, the greyish-green form sometimes being found on the red adults. Brooding the young in this location is very unusual among starfish, and the only other species known to do it are the sister species, Trophodiscus uber, from the Sea of Okhotsk, Leptychaster kerguelenensis from the extreme south of the Indian Ocean and Ctenodiscus australis from the Southern Ocean.
