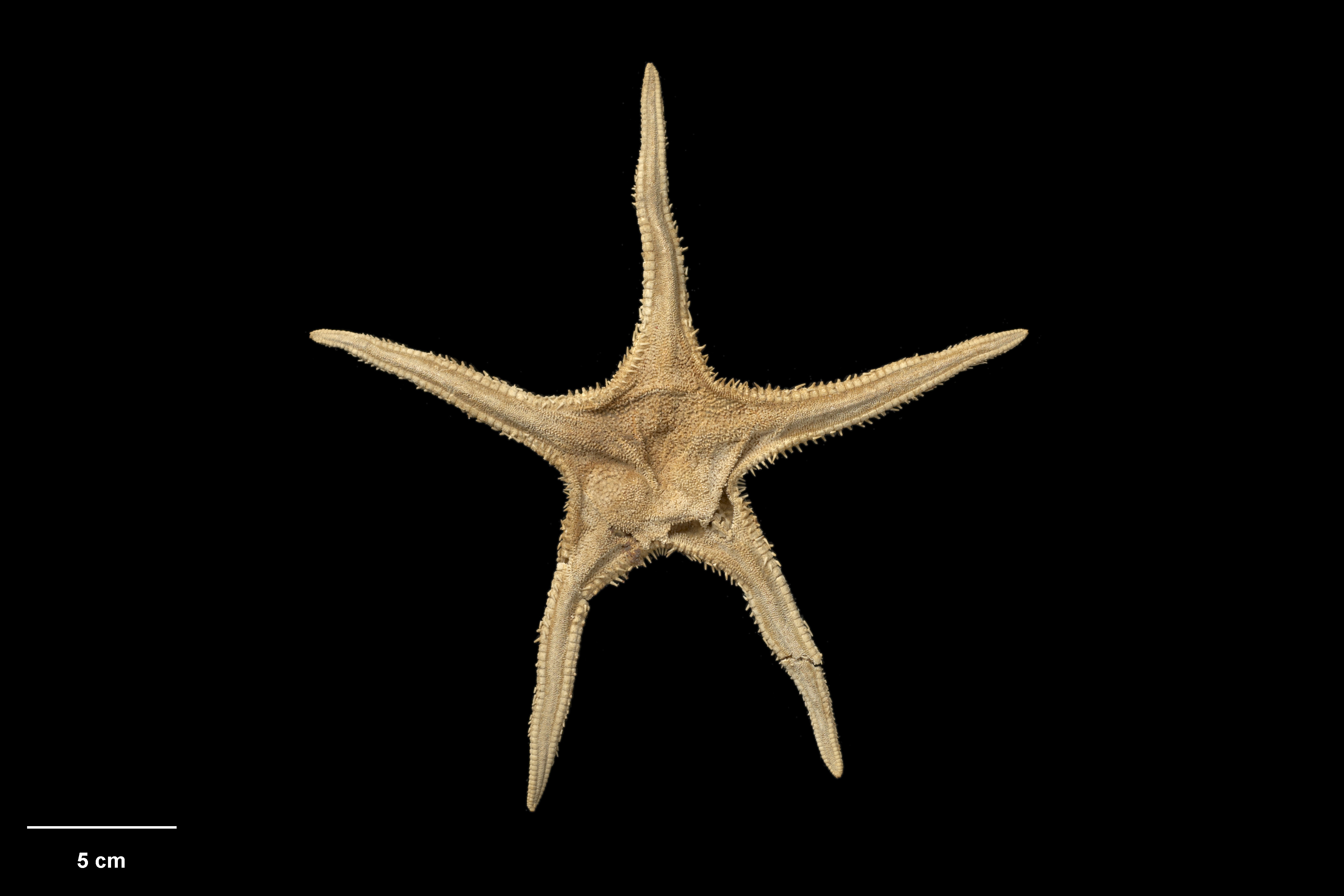
- Holotype specimen

Scientific classification
- Kingdom: Animalia
- Phylum: Echinodermata
- Class: Asteroidea
- Order: Paxillosida
- Family: Astropectinidae
- Genus: Plutonaster
- Species: P. knoxi

Binomial name
- Plutonaster knoxi Fell, 1958

= Plutonaster knoxi =

Species of starfish

Plutonaster knoxi is a species of starfish in the family Astropectinidae. This species was first described by Howard Barraclough Fell in 1958.
