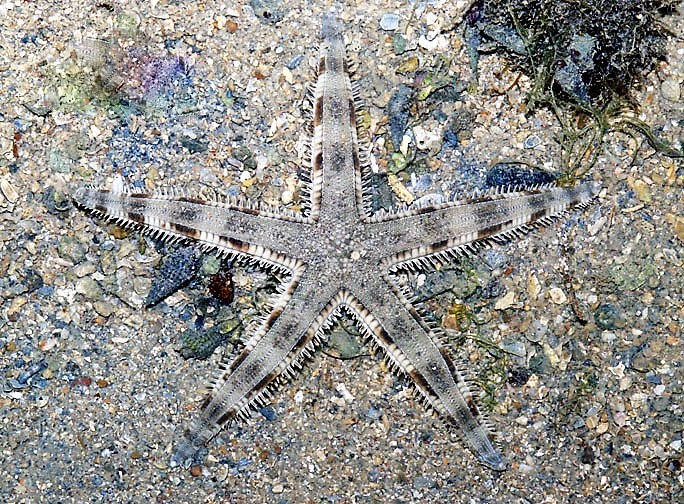

Scientific classification
- Kingdom: Animalia
- Phylum: Echinodermata
- Class: Asteroidea
- Order: Valvatida
- Family: Archasteridae
- Genus: Archaster
- Species: A. typicus

Binomial name
- Archaster typicus Müller & Troschel, 1840

Synonyms
- Astericola carens Humes, 1986; Synstellicola carens (Humes, 1986)

= Archaster typicus =

Species of starfish

Archaster typicus is a species of starfish in the family Archasteridae. It is commonly known as the sand star or the sand sifting star but these names are also applied to starfish in the genus Astropecten. It is found in shallow waters in the Indo-Pacific region.

== Description ==
Archaster typicus is a five-limbed star with long, slightly tapering arms with pointed tips. Occasionally three, four, or even six-armed individuals occur. Adults grow to 12 to 15 centimetres (4.7 to 5.9 in) in diameter, with males often being smaller than females. This starfish is adapted to life on the sandy seabed, where it buries in the sediment during high tides and moves over the sediment surface during low tides. The general colour is grey or brownish, variously marked with darker and lighter patches, sometimes forming a chevron pattern. The underside is pale. The body is slightly inflated and there is a whitish madreporite near the centre of the disc. The small armour plates that cover the upper surface of the arms are lined up in neat parallel rows which distinguishes it from the rather similar Astropecten polyacanthus which has similar habits and colouring. The spines, arranged in a marginal fringe, are short, flat and blunter than A. polyacanthus and the tube feet have suckers and not points.

== Distribution and habitat ==
Archaster typicus is found in the western Indian Ocean and the Indo-Pacific at depths down to 60 metres (200 ft). The range includes the Maldive Islands, the Bay of Bengal, Singapore, northern Australia, New Caledonia, the Philippines, China, southern Japan and Hawaii. It usually inhabits areas of the seabed with soft sediments including sand, silt and seagrass meadows. Larval settlement occurs among mangroves, while individuals gradually move to seagrass and sandy habitats as they age.

== Feeding ==
Archaster typicus is a detritivore and eats detritus and anything else edible it comes across. To feed, it everts its stomach through its mouth which is situated centrally on its underside. The food item is engulfed and brought inside the starfish when its stomach is returned to its normal position.

== Reproduction ==
Like other starfish, Archaster typicus is a broadcast spawner, the male and female starfish each liberate their gametes into the sea where fertilisation takes place. However, in contrast to most other starfish, Archaster typicus performs pseudocopulation. Specimens reach sexual maturity at a radius of 29 mm. About two months ahead of spawning the starfish begin to congregate, with males in particular becoming more mobile. A starfish can tell whether another is male or female, probably by chemotactic recognition. On recognizing a female, the male will climb on top of her and may remain there for two months. The female can move about and feed but the male is more restricted in his activities. During this time they synchronize their gonadal activity so that when the female is ready to spawn, so is the male. When she releases her eggs, he releases his sperm almost simultaneously thereby increasing the chances that successful fertilisation will take place. Mating occurs in September and October in the Philippines and pair densities reach up to 7 pairs per square meter during full moon, whereas during new moon none are found.
