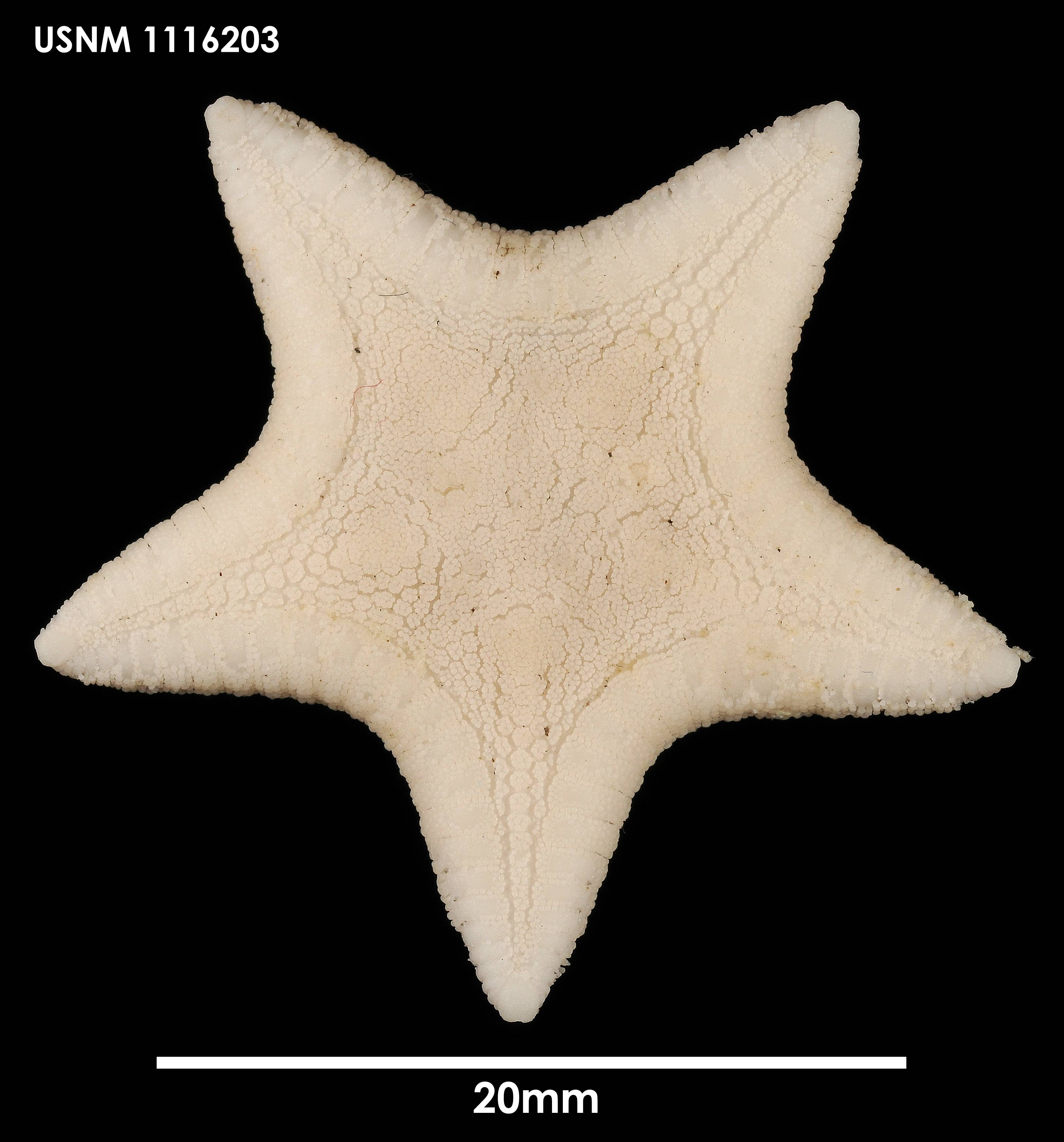

Scientific classification
- Kingdom: Animalia
- Phylum: Echinodermata
- Class: Asteroidea
- Order: Paxillosida
- Family: Pseudarchasteridae
- Genus: Pseudarchaster
- Species: P. discus

Binomial name
- Pseudarchaster discus Sladen, 1889

= Pseudarchaster discus =

Species of starfish

Pseudarchaster discus is a species of starfish from the Pseudarchasteridae family. This starfish has a mouth opening on its bottom side. The torso consists of a disk with arms. This starfish can regenerate a lost or damaged arm from its body.

This species belongs to the genus Pseudarchaster and can be found in the Antarctic Ocean and the Magellan Strait. The scientific name of this species was first published in 1889 by Salden
