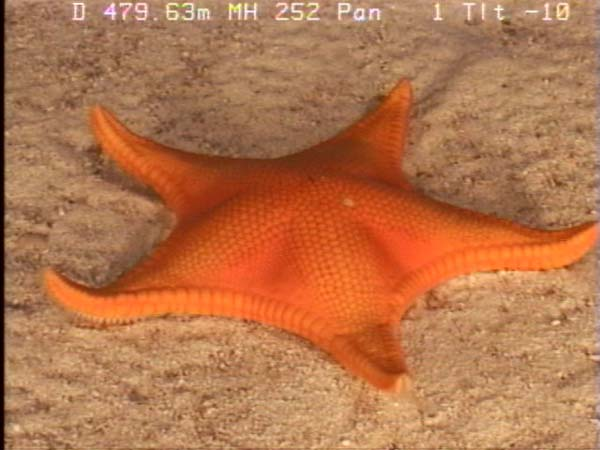

Scientific classification
- Kingdom: Animalia
- Phylum: Echinodermata
- Class: Asteroidea
- Order: Paxillosida
- Family: Pseudarchasteridae
- Genus: Pseudarchaster
- Species: P. myobrachius

Binomial name
- Pseudarchaster myobrachius Fisher, 1906

= Pseudarchaster myobrachius =

Species of starfish

Pseudarchaster myobrachius is a species of starfish.
