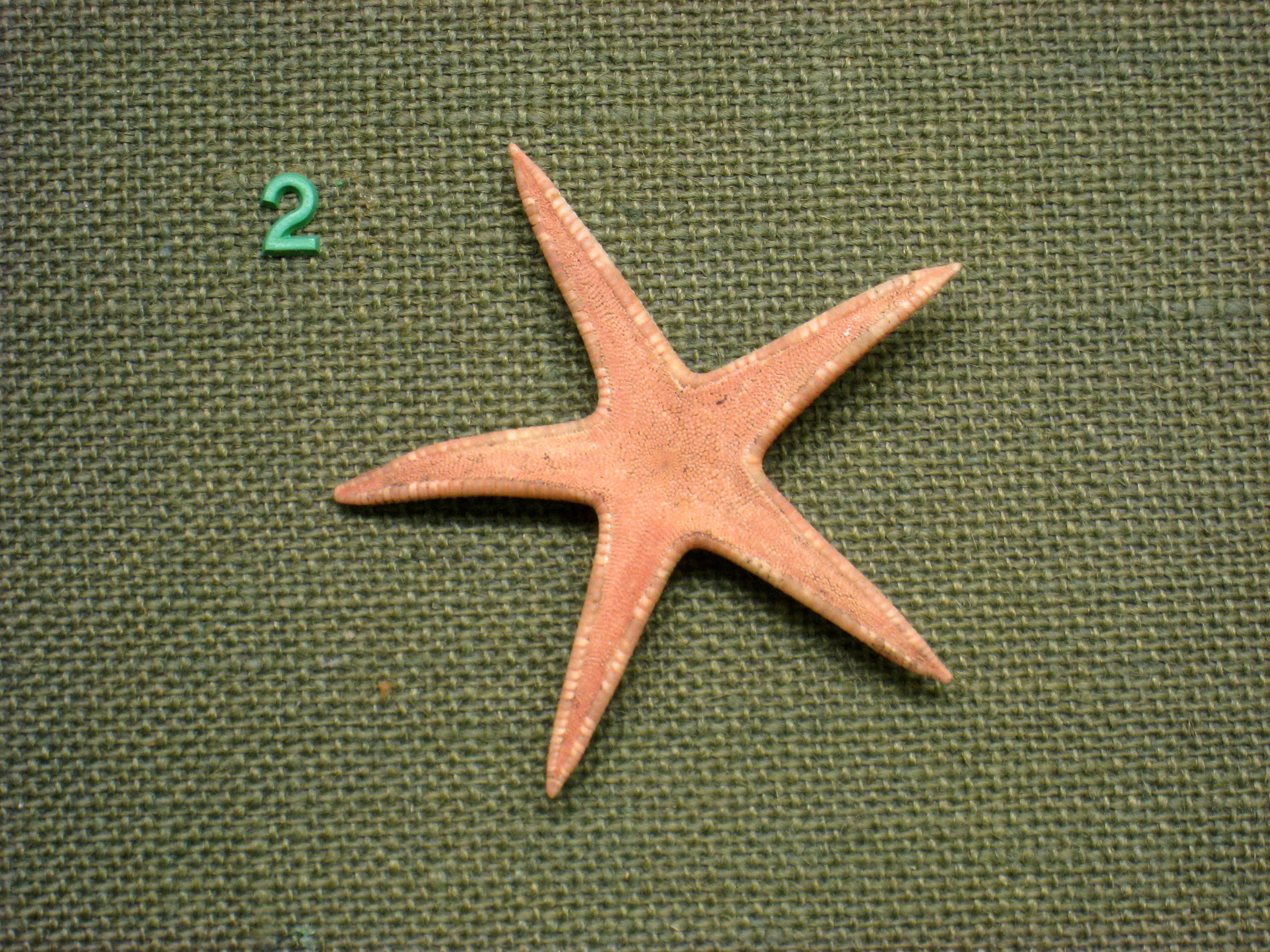

Scientific classification
- Kingdom: Animalia
- Phylum: Echinodermata
- Class: Asteroidea
- Order: Paxillosida
- Family: Astropectinidae
- Genus: Psilaster
- Species: P. andromeda

Binomial name
- Psilaster andromeda J. Müller & Troschel, 1842

Synonyms
- Archaster andromeda Möbius & Butschli, 1875; Archaster christi (Düben & Koren, 1846); Asterias aranciata Parelius, 1768; Astropecten christi Düben & Koren, 1846; Goniopecten chisti Perrier, 1885

= Psilaster andromeda =

Species of starfish

Psilaster andromeda is a species of starfish in the family Astropectinidae. It is native to the northeastern Atlantic Ocean where it occurs at abyssal depths.

== Distribution and habitat ==
Psilaster andromeda is a deep water species of starfish native to the northeastern Atlantic Ocean. Its range extends from Murmansk and the coasts of Norway to the Faeroes, the Kattegat, the United Kingdom and the Bay of Biscay. It is present in the Rockall Trough. It is found in Norwegian fiords on muddy bottoms at depths of 60 to 80 m (200 to 260 ft). It is also found in the Porcupine Seabight and on the Porcupine Abyssal Plain in the Northeast Atlantic at much greater depths.

== Biology ==
Psilaster andromeda is a carnivore, detritivore and omnivore. It mainly feeds on molluscs such as Abra. Nucula, Rissoa and Tellina, echinoderms, foraminifera, and sometimes crustaceans and annelids.

The gonads of Psilaster andromeda are located at the base of the arms and each one opens through a single gonopore. Fewer than 300 small oocytes are produced by each gonad. Some of these are phagocytosed and others are supplied with yolks and grow in size before being spawned.

A parasitic turbellarian Triloborhynchus psilastericola is often present in the coelom of the starfish and when the worm is approaching maturation, it moves into the pyloric caeca and at the same time loses all its cilia.
