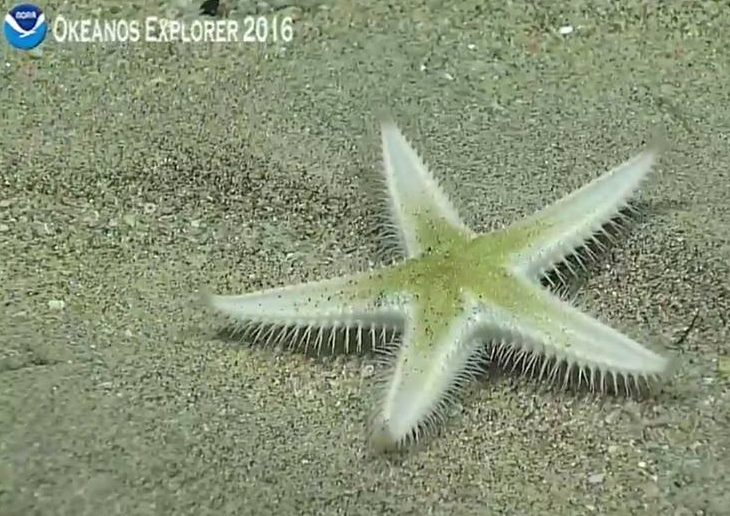
- Astropectinides ctenophora

Scientific classification
- Kingdom: Animalia
- Phylum: Echinodermata
- Class: Asteroidea
- Order: Paxillosida
- Family: Astropectinidae
- Genus: Astropectinides; Verrill, 1914

= Astropectinides =

Genus of starfishes

Astropectinides is a genus of starfish belonging to the family Astropectinidae.

Only three species have been described, two of which (Astropectinides callistus and Astropectinides ctenophora) are found in waters surrounding Hawaii, with the remaining species Astropectinides mescatus believed to be endemic to Tristan da Cunha.

The type material of the two Hawaiian species is mostly held in the Smithsonian National Museum of Natural History, but additional material is also known to be in the Natural History Museum, London. The type and only known specimen of Astropectinides mescatus was collected by the Challenger Expedition in 1873 from deep water near Inaccessible Island, Tristan da Cunha Group and is held in the Natural History Museum, London.

Currently Recognised Species:

- Astropectinides callistus (Fisher, 1906)
- Astropectinides ctenophora (Fisher, 1906)
- Astropectinides mesactus (Sladen, 1883)
