= Thrissacanthias =

Scientific classification
- Kingdom: Animalia
- Phylum: Echinodermata
- Class: Asteroidea
- Order: Paxillosida
- Family: Astropectinidae
- Genus: Thrissacanthias; Fisher, 1910

Species
- See text

Genus of starfishes

Thrissacanthias are a genus of sea stars in the family Astropectinidae.

== Species ==
- Thrissacanthias bispinosus
- Thrissacanthias penicillatus
