= Ctenopleura =

Scientific classification
- Kingdom: Animalia
- Phylum: Echinodermata
- Class: Asteroidea
- Order: Paxillosida
- Family: Astropectinidae
- Genus: Ctenopleura; Fisher, 1913

Genus of starfishes

Ctenopleura is a genus of echinoderms belonging to the family Astropectinidae.

The species of this genus are found in Japan, Malesia and Australia.

Species:

- Ctenopleura astropectinides Fisher, 1913
- Ctenopleura fisheri Hayashi, 1957
- Ctenopleura ludwigi (deLoriol, 1899)
- Ctenopleura sagamina (Döderlein, 1917)
