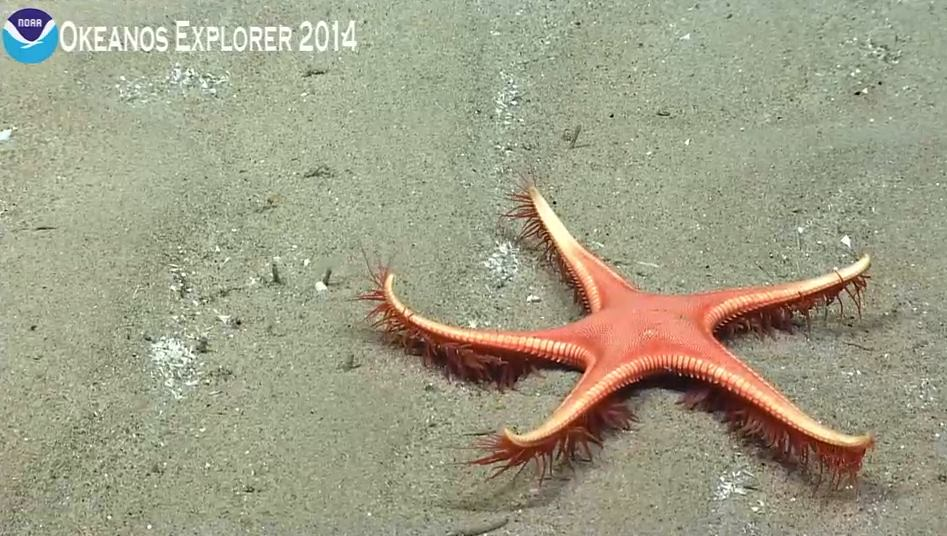
- Plutonaster sp

Scientific classification
- Kingdom: Animalia
- Phylum: Echinodermata
- Class: Asteroidea
- Order: Paxillosida
- Family: Astropectinidae
- Genus: Plutonaster; Sladen, 1889

= Plutonaster =

Genus of starfishes

Plutonaster is a genus of echinoderms belonging to the family Astropectinidae.

The genus has almost cosmopolitan distribution.

Species:

- Plutonaster agassizi (Verrill, 1880)
- Plutonaster ambiguus Sladen, 1889
- Plutonaster bifrons (Wyville Thomson, 1873)
- Plutonaster complexus H.E.S Clark & D.G.McKnight, 2000
- Plutonaster edwardsi (Perrier, 1882)
- Plutonaster efflorescens (Perrier, 1884)
- Plutonaster fragilis H.E.S.Clark, 1970
- Plutonaster hikurangi H.E.S Clark & D.G.McKnight, 2000
- Plutonaster intermedius (Perrier, 1881)
- Plutonaster jonathani H.E.S Clark & D.G.McKnight, 2000
- Plutonaster keiensis Döderlein, 1921
- Plutonaster knoxi Fell, 1958
- Plutonaster sirius A.H. Clark, 1917
