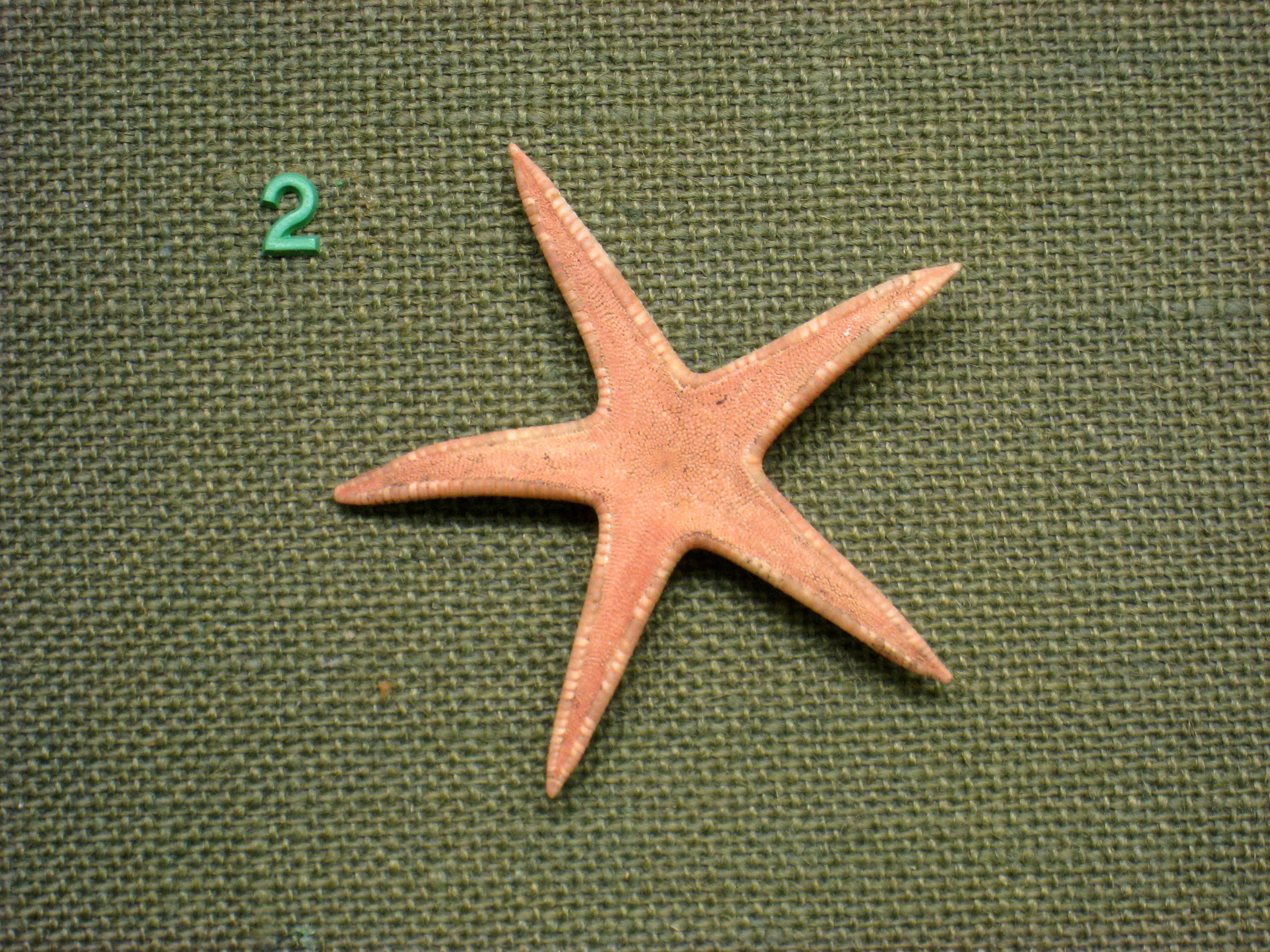
- Psilaster andromeda

Scientific classification
- Kingdom: Animalia
- Phylum: Echinodermata
- Class: Asteroidea
- Order: Paxillosida
- Family: Astropectinidae
- Genus: Psilaster; Sladen, 1885

Species
- See text

= Psilaster =

Genus of starfishes

Psilaster is a genus of sea stars of the family Astropectinidae.

== Species ==
The World Register of Marine Species lists the following species in the genus: -

- Psilaster acuminatus Sladen, 1889
- Psilaster agassizi (Koehler, 1909)
- Psilaster andromeda (Müller & Troschel, 1842)
- Psilaster armatus Ludwig, 1905
- Psilaster attenuatus Fisher, 1906
- Psilaster cassiope Sladen, 1889
- Psilaster charcoti (Koehler, 1906)
- Psilaster florae (Verrill, 1878)
- Psilaster gotoi Fisher, 1913
- Psilaster herwigi (Bernasconi, 1972)
- Psilaster pectinatus (Fisher, 1905)
- Psilaster robustus Fisher, 1913
- Psilaster sladeni Ludwig, 1905
