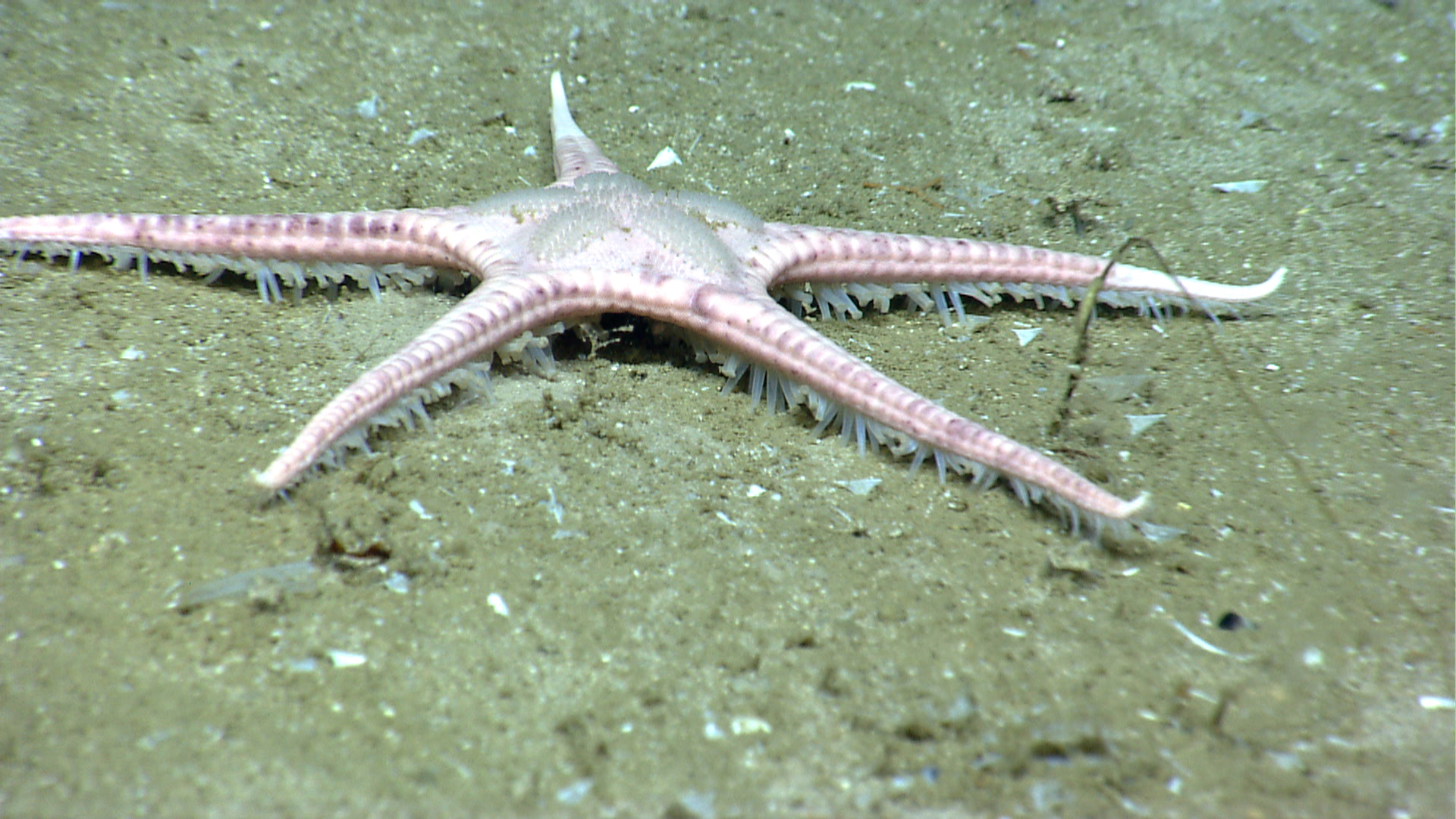
- In the Gulf of Mexico
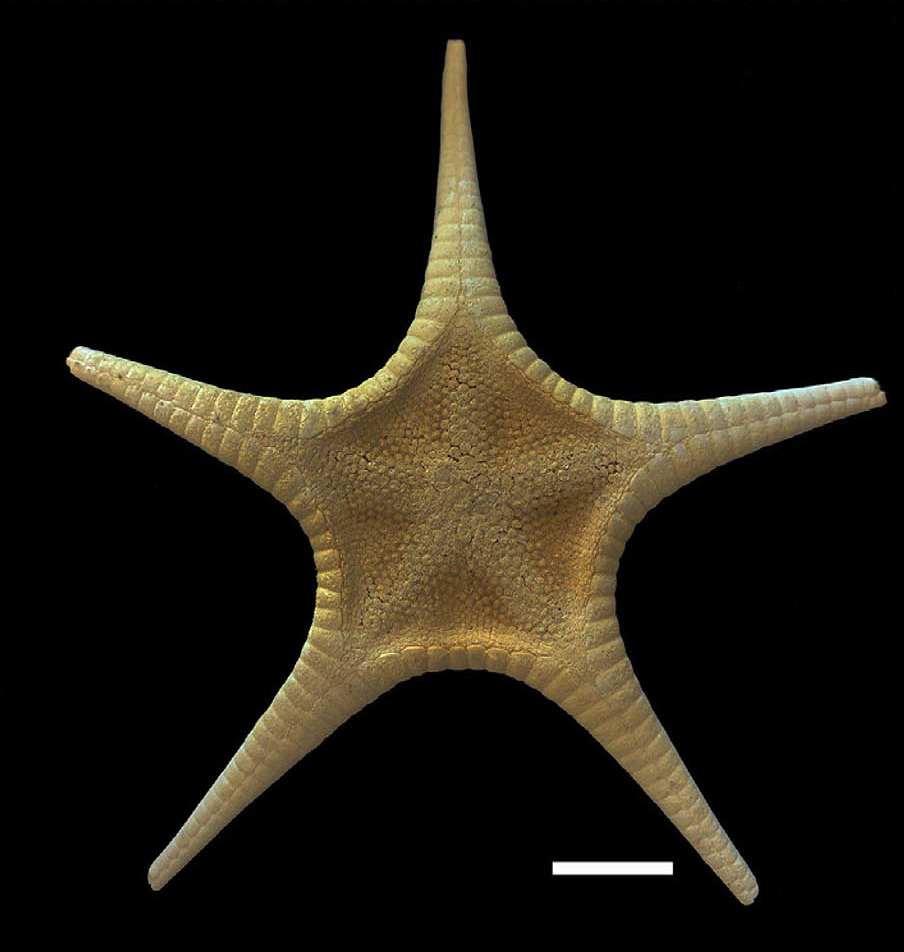
- Scale bar=2 cm.

Scientific classification
- Kingdom: Animalia
- Phylum: Echinodermata
- Class: Asteroidea
- Order: Valvatida
- Family: Goniasteridae
- Genus: Nymphaster
- Species: N. arenatus

Binomial name
- Nymphaster arenatus (Perrier, 1881)

= Nymphaster arenatus =

Species of starfish

Nymphaster arenatus is a species of starfish belonging to the family Goniasteridae that is native to the eastern-central Atlantic Ocean and Mediterranean Sea.

It lives at a depth of 58-3000 meters in subtropical waters.
