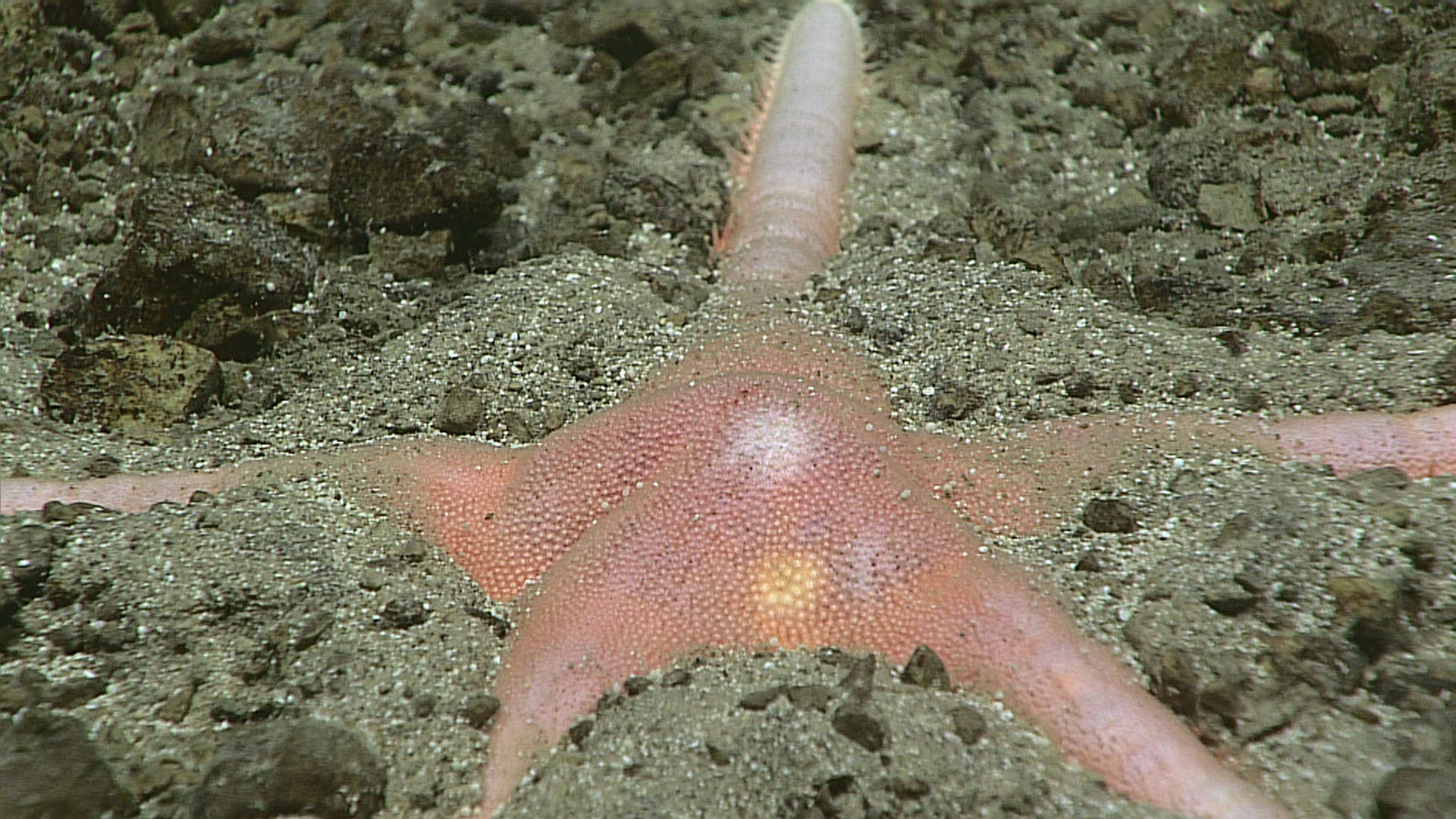
- Dytaster insignis

Scientific classification
- Kingdom: Animalia
- Phylum: Echinodermata
- Class: Asteroidea
- Order: Paxillosida
- Family: Astropectinidae
- Genus: Dytaster; Sladen, 1889

= Dytaster =

Genus of starfishes

Dytaster is a genus of echinoderms belonging to the family Astropectinidae.

The genus has almost cosmopolitan distribution.

Species:

- Dytaster aequivocus Sladen, 1889
- Dytaster agassizi Perrier, 1894
- Dytaster cherbonnieri Sibuet, 1975
- Dytaster evaulus Fisher, 1913
- Dytaster exilis Sladen, 1889
- Dytaster felix Koehler, 1907
- Dytaster felli H.E.S Clark & D.G.McKnight, 2000
- Dytaster gilberti Fisher, 1905
- Dytaster grandis (Verrill, 1884)
- Dytaster inermis Sladen, 1889
- Dytaster insignis (Perrier, 1884)
- Dytaster intermedius Perrier, 1891
- Dytaster mollis (Perrier, 1885)
- Dytaster nobilis Sladen, 1889
- Dytaster pedicellaris H.E.S Clark & D.G.McKnight, 2000
- Dytaster rigidus Perrier, 1894
- Dytaster semispinosus (Perrier, 1894)
- Dytaster spinosus Sladen, 1889
- Dytaster spinulosus (Perrier, 1894)
