= Trophodiscus =

Scientific classification
- Kingdom: Animalia
- Phylum: Echinodermata
- Class: Asteroidea
- Order: Paxillosida
- Family: Astropectinidae
- Genus: Trophodiscus; Fisher, 1917

Species
- See text

Genus of starfishes

Trophodiscus is a genus of starfish in the family Astropectinidae. There are only two species, both found in fairly deep waters in the Sea of Okhotsk. Trophodiscus almus is also found in the Sea of Japan and around the Japanese island of Hokkaido. These starfish are very unusual in that the young are brooded on the upper surface of the female.

== Species ==
The World Register of Marine Species includes the following two species in the genus:

- Trophodiscus almus Fisher, 1917
- Trophodiscus uber Djakonov, 1927
