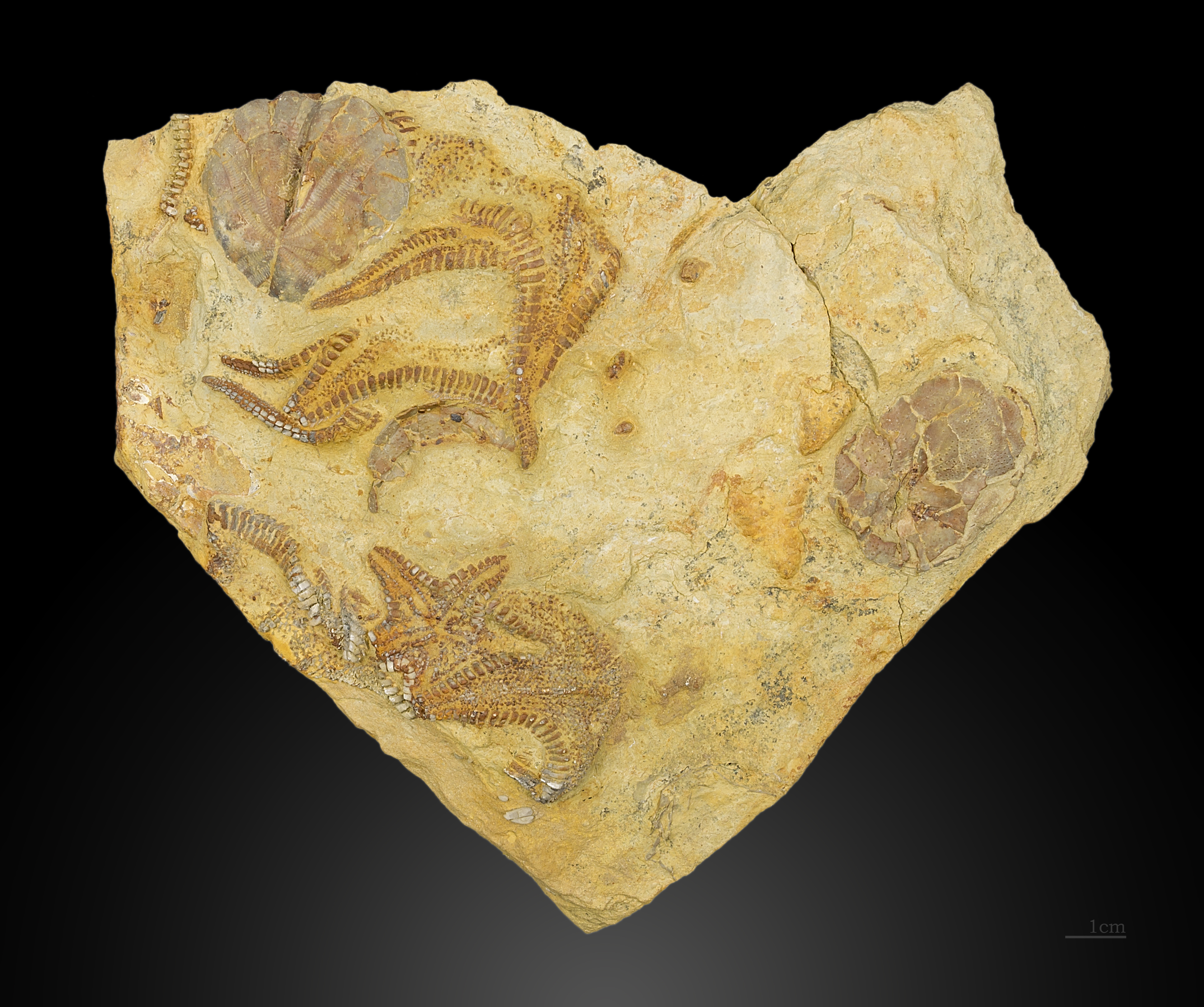
- Dipsacaster africanus Holotype - MHNT

Scientific classification
- Domain: Eukaryota
- Kingdom: Animalia
- Phylum: Echinodermata
- Class: Asteroidea
- Order: Paxillosida
- Family: Astropectinidae
- Genus: †Dipsacaster; Alcock, 1893

= Dipsacaster =

Extinct genus of starfishes

Dipsacaster is an extinct genus of sea stars in the family Astropectinidae. It was described by Alcock in 1893, and is known from France and Morocco. It contains the species D. jadeti and D. africanus.
