= Calliderma (echinoderm) =

Calliderma Temporal range: 94.3–48.6 Ma

Scientific classification
- Kingdom: Animalia
- Phylum: Echinodermata
- Class: Asteroidea
- Order: Valvatida
- Family: Goniasteridae
- Genus: †Calliderma; Gray, 1847

Species
- Calliderma (Mastaster) Wright and Wright 1940; Calliderma atagensis Valette 1925; Calliderma emma Gray, 1847; Calliderma juigneti Breton 1988; Calliderma moreaui Néraudeau and Breton 1993; Calliderma smithiae (Forbes 1848); Calliderma viaudi Breton 1988

Extinct genus of sea stars

Calliderma is an extinct genus of sea stars in the family Goniasteridae. Species are known from the Cretaceous to the Eocene.

== See also ==
- List of prehistoric echinoderm genera
- List of prehistoric starfish genera
