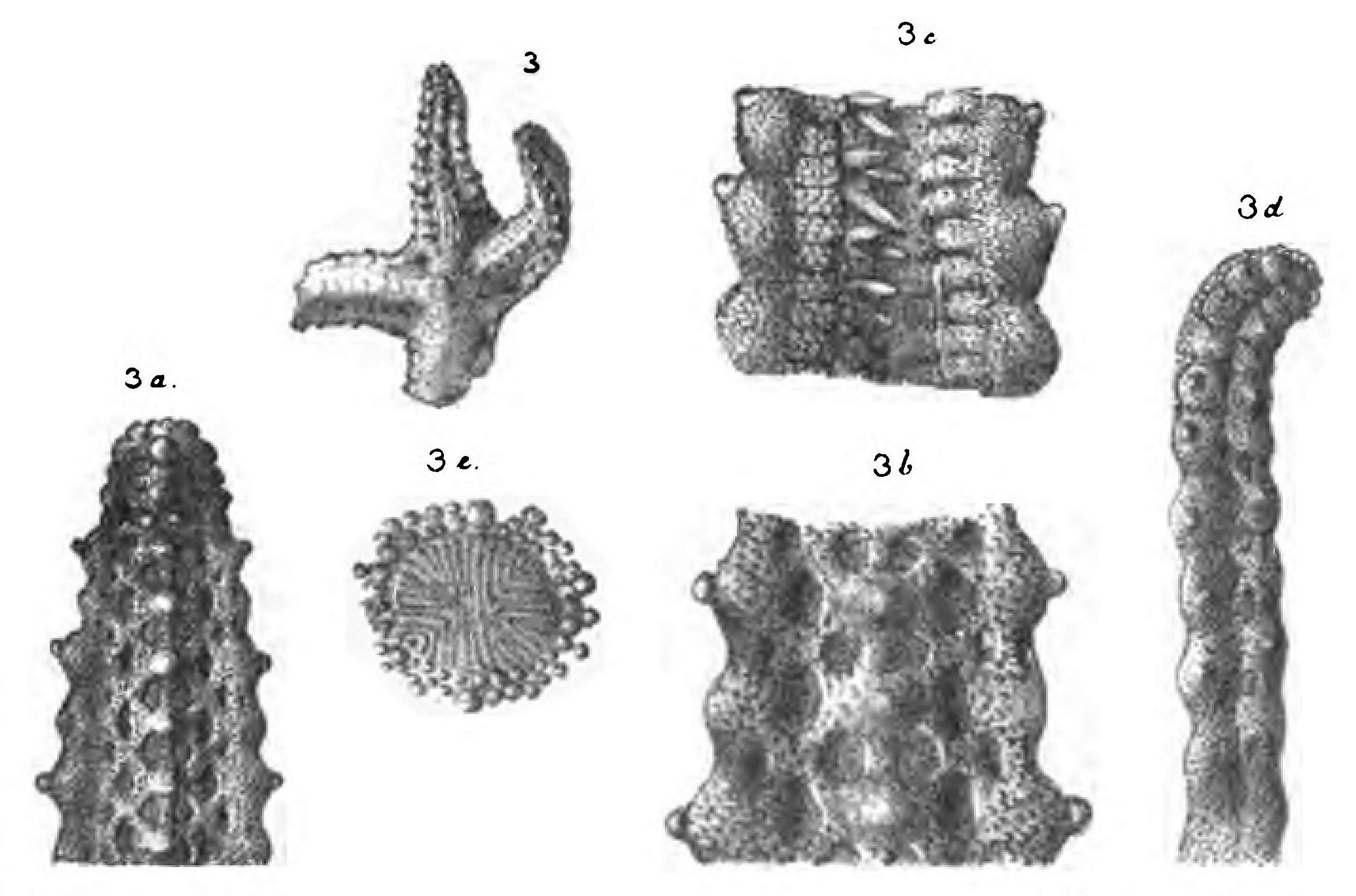

Scientific classification
- Kingdom: Animalia
- Phylum: Echinodermata
- Class: Asteroidea
- Order: Valvatida
- Family: Ophidiasteridae
- Genus: †Chariaster de Loriol, 1909
- Species: †C. elegans

Binomial name
- †Chariaster elegans de Loriol, 1909

= Chariaster =

Chariaster Temporal range: 85.8–84.9 Ma

Extinct genus of starfishes

Chariaster is an extinct genus of prehistoric starfish in the family Ophidiasteridae. The species C. elegans is found only at Abou Roach (Cretaceous of Egypt).

== See also ==
- List of prehistoric echinoderm genera
- List of prehistoric starfish genera
