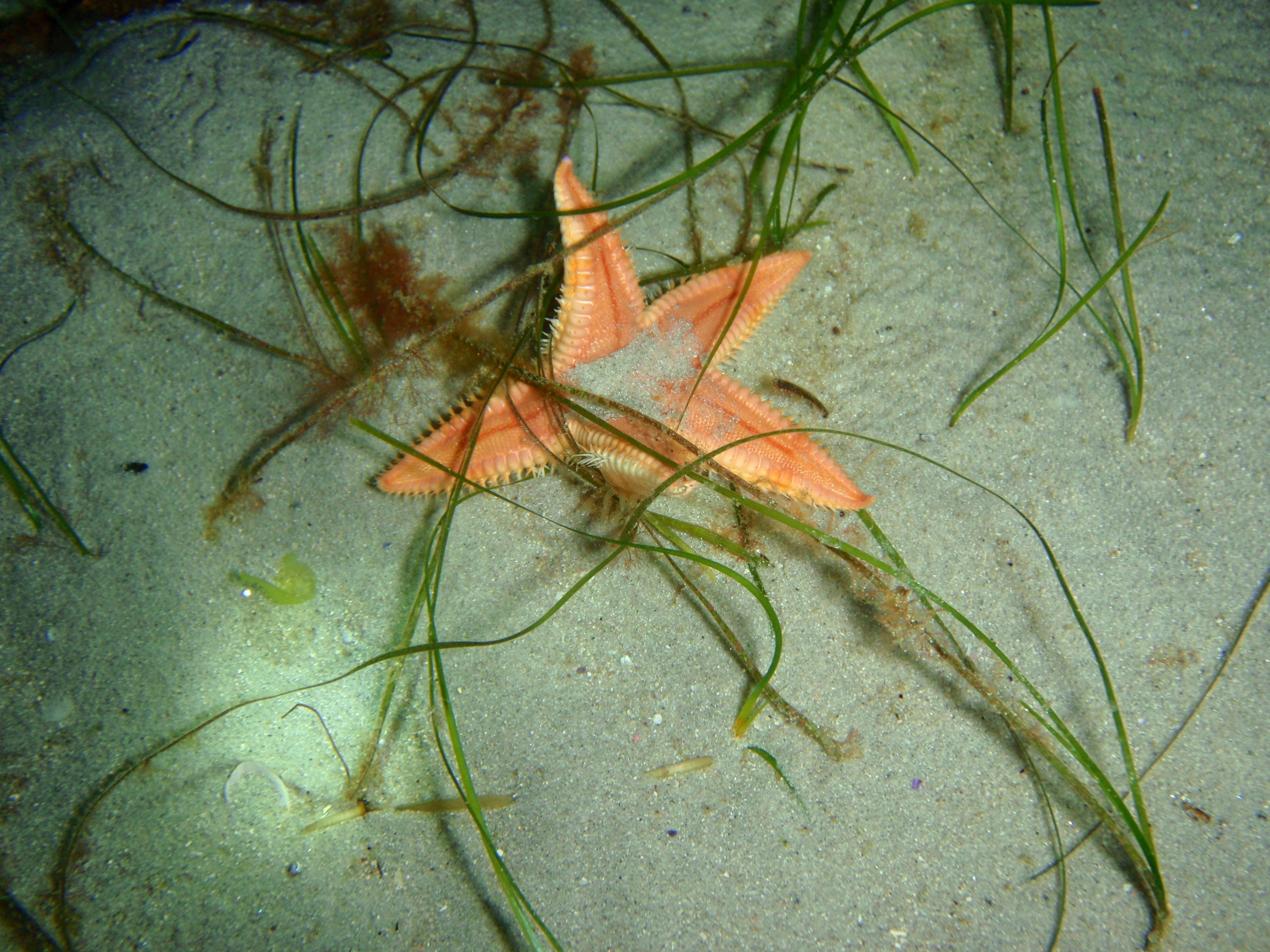
- Bollonaster pectinatus

Scientific classification
- Kingdom: Animalia
- Phylum: Echinodermata
- Class: Asteroidea
- Order: Paxillosida
- Family: Astropectinidae
- Genus: Bollonaster; McKnight, 1977
- Species: B. pectinatus

Binomial name
- Bollonaster pectinatus (Sladen, 1883)

= Bollonaster =

Genus of starfishes

Bollonaster is a monotypic genus of echinoderms belonging to the family Astropectinidae. The only species is Bollonaster pectinatus.

The species is found in Australia.
