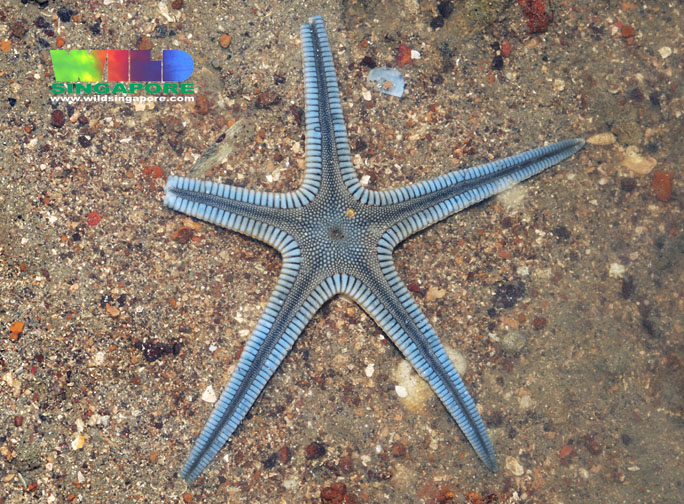

Scientific classification
- Kingdom: Animalia
- Phylum: Echinodermata
- Class: Asteroidea
- Order: Paxillosida
- Family: Astropectinidae
- Genus: Craspidaster; Sladen, 1889
- Species: C. hesperus

Binomial name
- Craspidaster hesperus (Muller & Troschel, 1840)

= Craspidaster =

Genus of starfishes

Craspidaster is a monotypic genus of echinoderms belonging to the family Astropectinidae. The only species is Craspidaster hesperus.

The species is found in Malesia and Indian Ocean.
