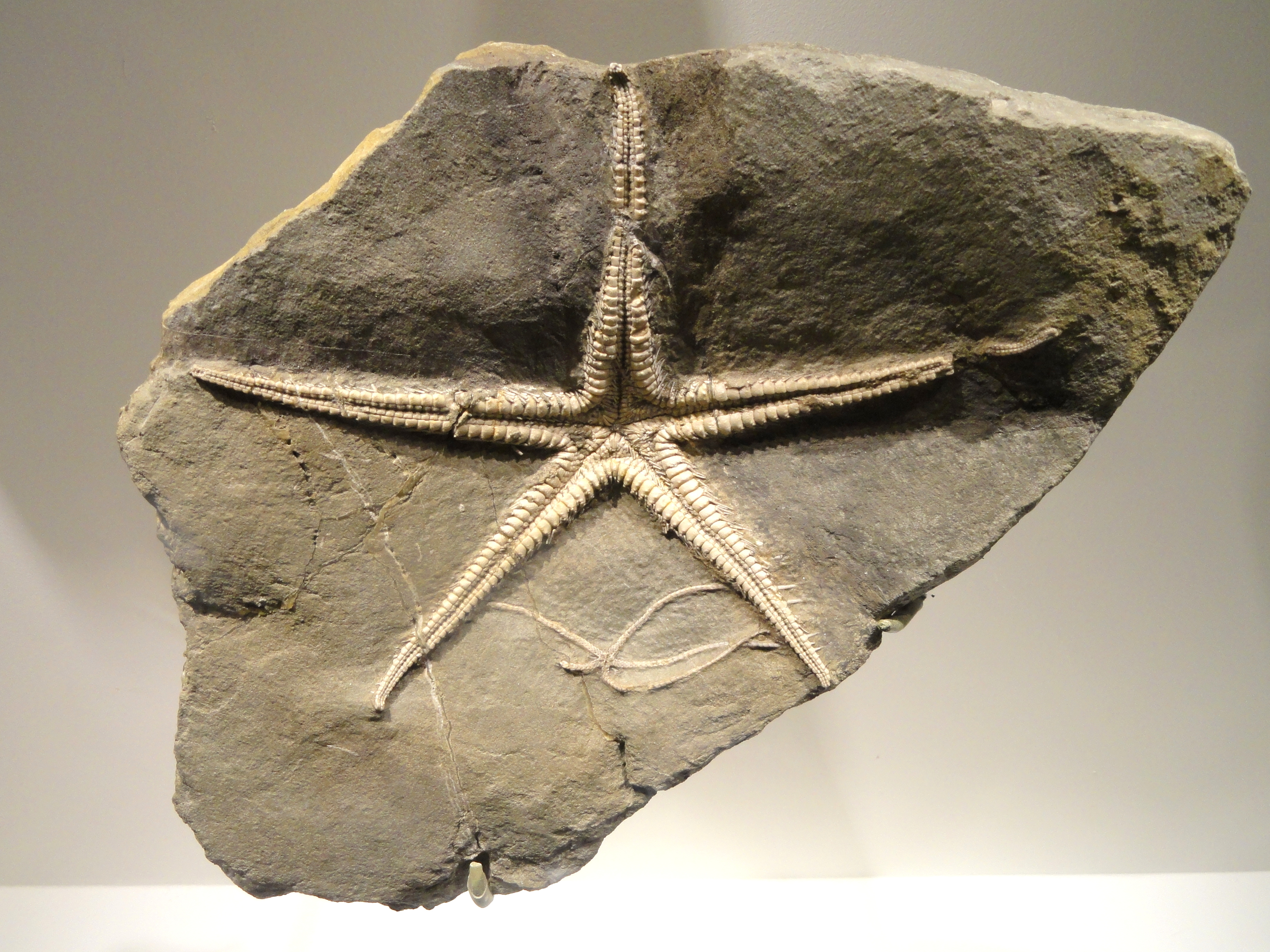
- Pentasteria longispina

Scientific classification
- Domain: Eukaryota
- Kingdom: Animalia
- Phylum: Echinodermata
- Class: Asteroidea
- Order: Paxillosida
- Family: Astropectinidae
- Genus: †Pentasteria; Valette, 1929

= Pentasteria =

Pentasteria Temporal range: Early Jurassic-Early Cretaceous

Extinct genus of starfishes

Pentasteria is an extinct genus of sea star that lived from the Early Jurassic to the Early Cretaceous. Its fossils have been found in Europe.

== Selected species ==
- Pentasteria boisteli
- Pentasteria elegans
- Pentasteria gataui
- Pentasteria liasica
- Pentasteria longispina
- Pentasteria recta
- Pentasteria tithonica
