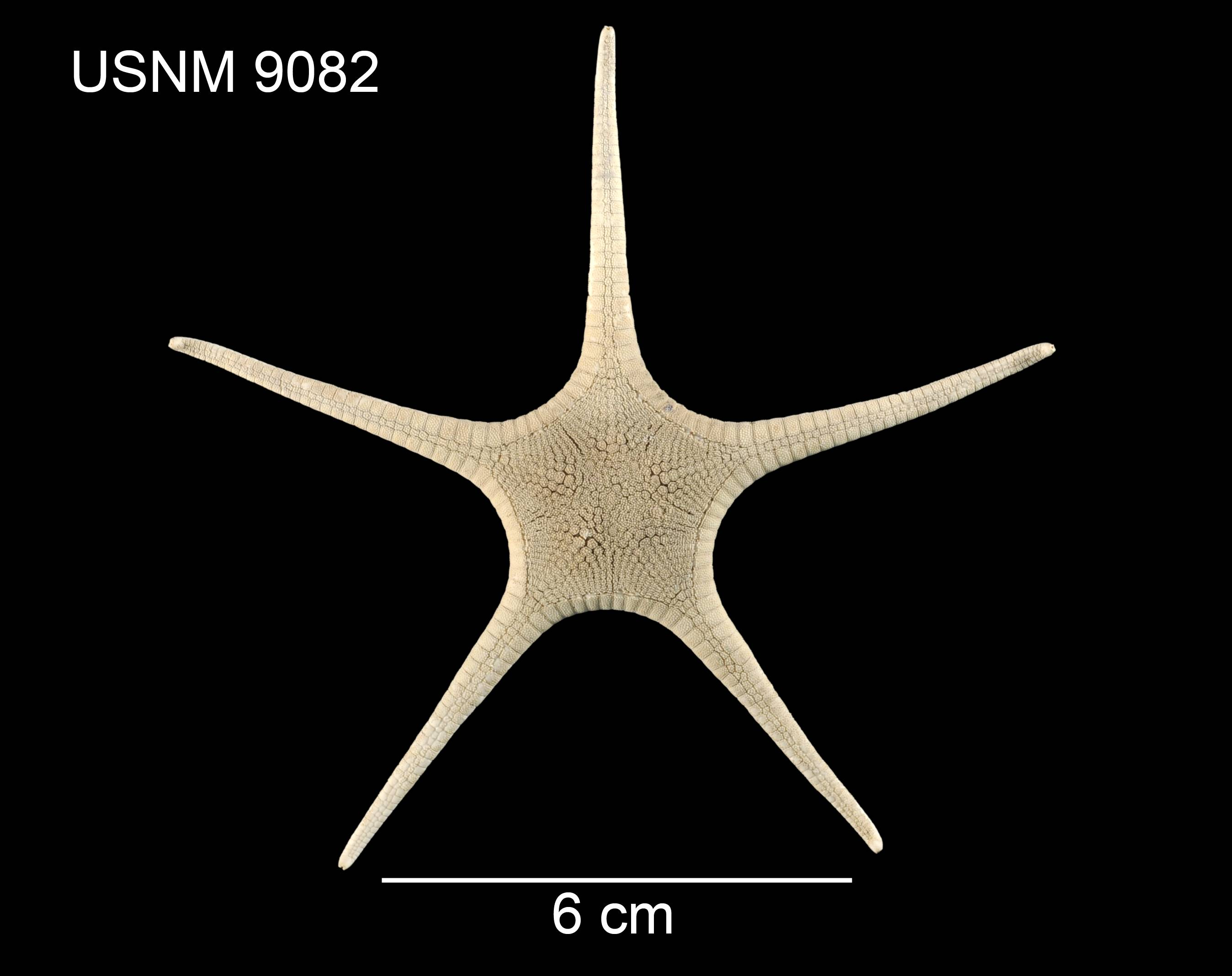

Scientific classification
- Kingdom: Animalia
- Phylum: Echinodermata
- Class: Asteroidea
- Order: Paxillosida
- Family: Pseudarchasteridae
- Genus: Paragonaster; Sladen, 1889

= Paragonaster =

Genus of starfishes

Paragonaster is a genus of echinoderms belonging to the family Pseudarchasteridae.

The genus has almost cosmopolitan distribution.

Species:

- Paragonaster chinensis Liao, 1983
- Paragonaster clarkae Blake & Aronson, 1998
- Paragonaster ctenipes Sladen, 1889
- Paragonaster felli Stevens, 2020
- Paragonaster grandis H.L. Clark, 1941
- Paragonaster haldixoni Jagt, Thuy, Donovan & Stohr, 2014
- Paragonaster ridgwayi McKnight, 1973
- Paragonaster stenostichus Fisher, 1913
- Paragonaster subtilis (Perrier, 1881)
- Paragonaster tenuiradiis Alcock, 1893
- Paragonaster August 5, 2024
