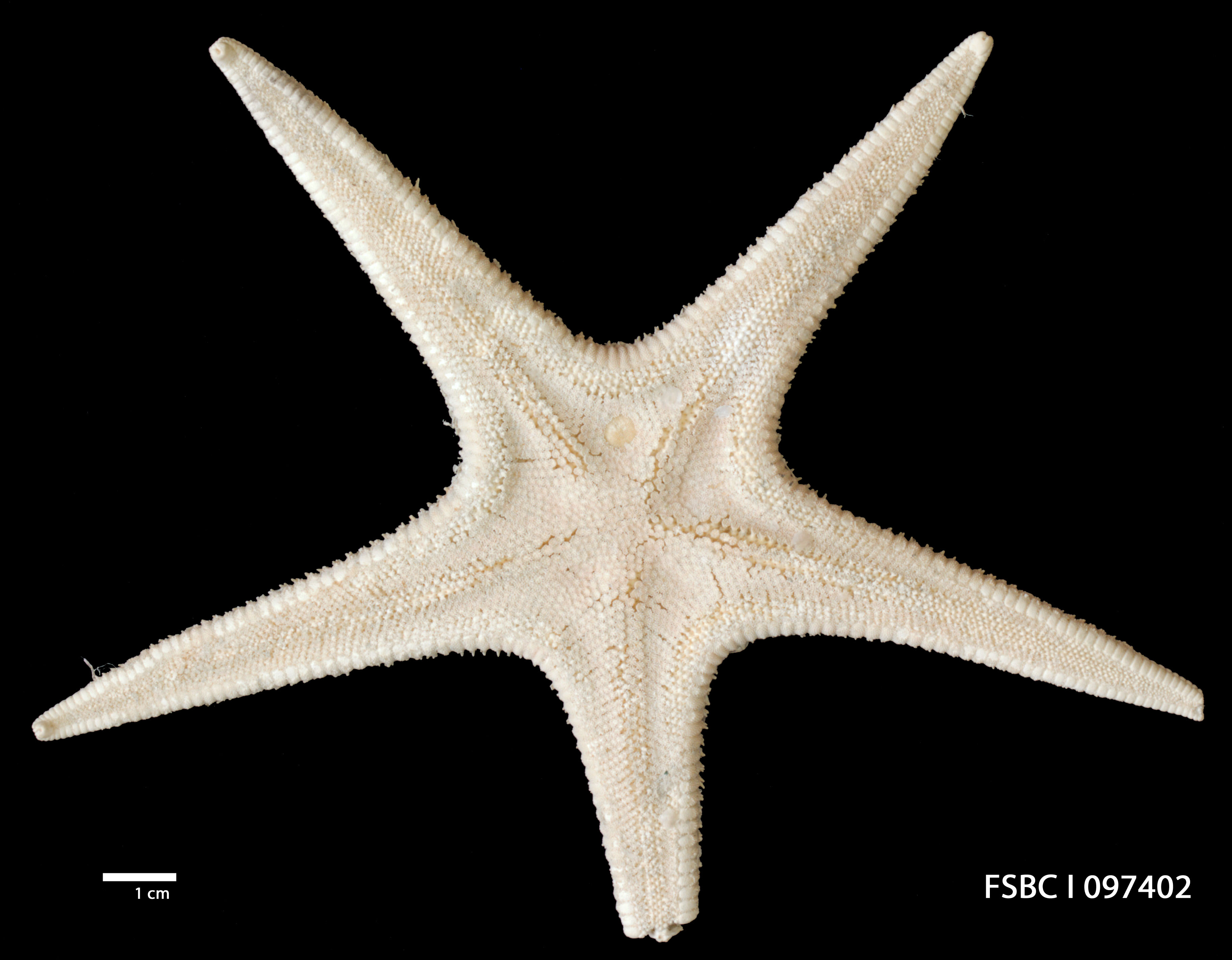
- Tethyaster grandis

Scientific classification
- Kingdom: Animalia
- Phylum: Echinodermata
- Class: Asteroidea
- Order: Paxillosida
- Family: Astropectinidae
- Genus: Tethyaster; Sladen, 1889

= Tethyaster =

Genus of starfishes

Tethyaster is a genus of echinoderms belonging to the family Astropectinidae.

The genus has almost cosmopolitan distribution.

Species:

- Tethyaster albertensis Hall & Moore, 1990
- Tethyaster antares Fernández, Perez, Luci & Carrizo, 2014
- Tethyaster aulophora (Fisher, 1911)
- Tethyaster canaliculatus (A.H. Clark, 1916)
- Tethyaster grandis (Verrill, 1899)
- Tethyaster guerangeri Breton, 1992
- Tethyaster jurassicus Blake, 1986
- Tethyaster pacei (Mortensen, 1925)
- Tethyaster subinermis (Philippi, 1837)
- Tethyaster tangaroae Rowe, 1989
- Tethyaster vestitus (Say, 1825)
