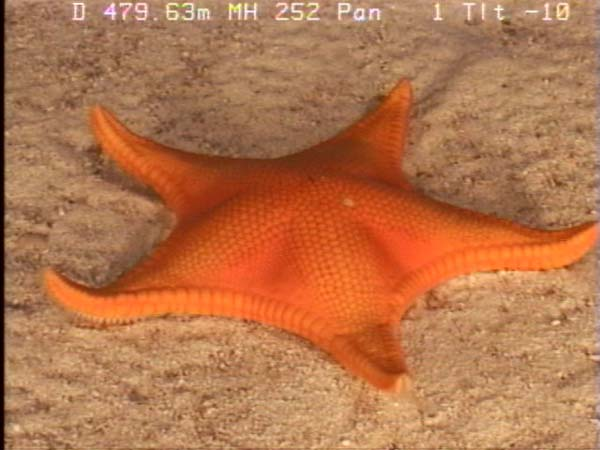
- Pseudarchaster myobrachius

Scientific classification
- Kingdom: Animalia
- Phylum: Echinodermata
- Class: Asteroidea
- Order: Paxillosida
- Family: Pseudarchasteridae
- Genus: Pseudarchaster; Sladen, 1889

= Pseudarchaster =

Genus of starfishes

Pseudarchaster is a genus of echinoderms belonging to the family Pseudarchasteridae.

The genus has almost cosmopolitan distribution.

Species:

- Pseudarchaster alascensis Fisher, 1905
- Pseudarchaster discus Sladen, 1889
- Pseudarchaster dissonus Fisher, 1910
- Pseudarchaster diversigranulatus Macan, 1938
- Pseudarchaster garricki Fell, 1958
- Pseudarchaster gracilis (Sladen, 1889)
- Pseudarchaster hispidus Verrill, 1899
- Pseudarchaster jordani Fisher, 1906
- Pseudarchaster macdougalli McKnight, 1973
- Pseudarchaster microceramus (Fisher, 1913)
- Pseudarchaster motutaraensis Eagle, 1999
- Pseudarchaster mozaicus Wood-Mason & Alcock, 1891
- Pseudarchaster myobrachius Fisher, 1906
- Pseudarchaster obtusus Hayashi, 1973
- Pseudarchaster oligoporus Fisher, 1913
- Pseudarchaster ornatus Djakonov, 1950
- Pseudarchaster parelii (Düben & Koren, 1846)
- Pseudarchaster pectinifer Ludwig, 1905
- Pseudarchaster portlandicus (Hess, 1955)
- Pseudarchaster pulcher Ludwig, 1905
- Pseudarchaster pusillus Fisher, 1905
- Pseudarchaster roseus (Alcock, 1893)
- Pseudarchaster tessellatus Sladen, 1889
- Pseudarchaster verrilli Ludwig, 1905
