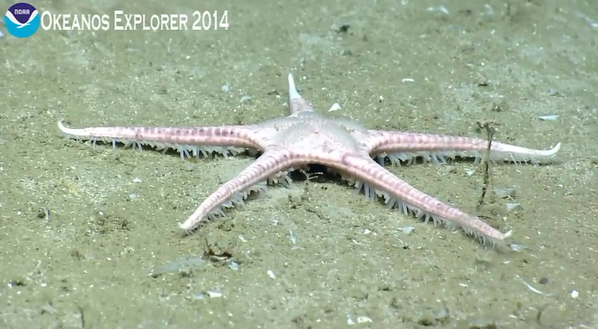
- Nymphaster arenatus

Scientific classification
- Kingdom: Animalia
- Phylum: Echinodermata
- Class: Asteroidea
- Order: Valvatida
- Family: Goniasteridae
- Genus: Nymphaster; Sladen, 1889

= Nymphaster =

Genus of starfishes

Nymphaster is a genus of echinoderms belonging to the family Goniasteridae.

The genus has almost cosmopolitan distribution.

Species:

- Nymphaster alcocki Ludwig, 1900
- Nymphaster arenatus (Perrier, 1881)
- Nymphaster arthrocnemis Fisher, 1913
- Nymphaster atopus Fisher, 1913
- Nymphaster coombii (Forbes, 1848)
- Nymphaster diomedeae Ludwig, 1905
- Nymphaster dolmeni Breton, 1992
- Nymphaster dyscritus Fisher, 1913
- Nymphaster euryplax Fisher, 1913
- Nymphaster fontis Breton & Vizcaino, 1997
- Nymphaster gardineri (Bell, 1909)
- Nymphaster habrotatus Fisher, 1913
- Nymphaster leptodomus Fisher, 1913
- Nymphaster magistrorum (Breton, 1988)
- Nymphaster marginatus Sladen, 1893
- Nymphaster meseres Fisher, 1913
- Nymphaster miocenicus Valette, 1926
- Nymphaster moebii (Studer, 1884)
- Nymphaster moluccanus Fisher, 1913
- Nymphaster mucronatus Fisher, 1913
- Nymphaster nora Alcock, 1893
- Nymphaster obtusus (Forbes, 1848)
- Nymphaster peakei Gale, 1987
- Nymphaster pentagonus H.L. Clark, 1916
- Nymphaster robustus Spencer, 1905
- Nymphaster tethysiensis Villier, 2001
