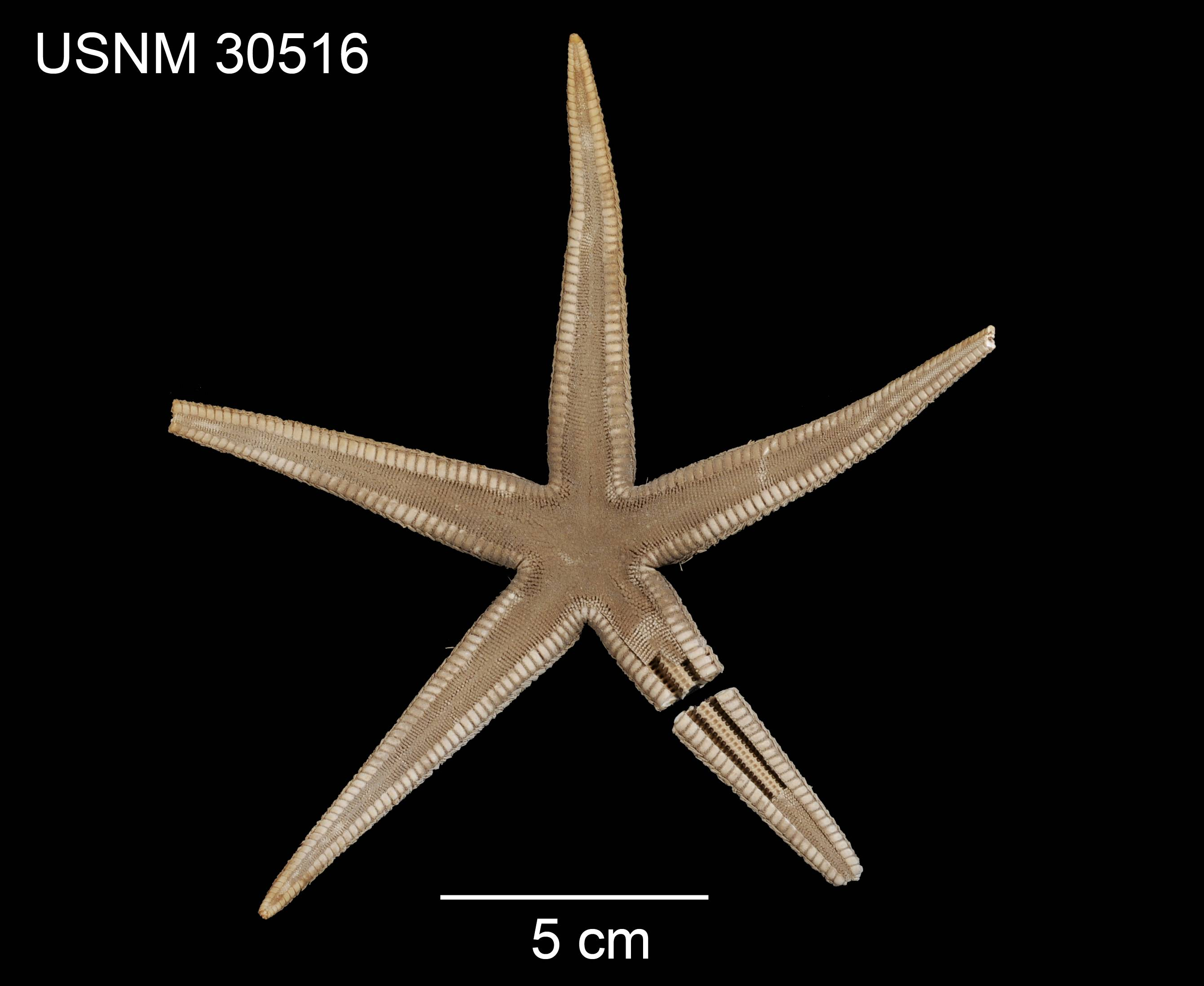
- Ctenophoraster diploctenius

Scientific classification
- Kingdom: Animalia
- Phylum: Echinodermata
- Class: Asteroidea
- Order: Paxillosida
- Family: Astropectinidae
- Genus: Ctenophoraster; Fisher, 1906

= Ctenophoraster =

Genus of sea stars

Ctenophoraster is a genus of echinoderms belonging to the family Astropectinidae.

The species of this genus are found in Indian and Pacific Ocean.

Species:

- Ctenophoraster diploctenius Fisher, 1913
- Ctenophoraster donghaiensis Liao & Sun, 1989
- Ctenophoraster downeyae Blake, 1988
- Ctenophoraster hawaiiensis Fisher, 1906
- Ctenophoraster marquesensis Marsh, 1974
