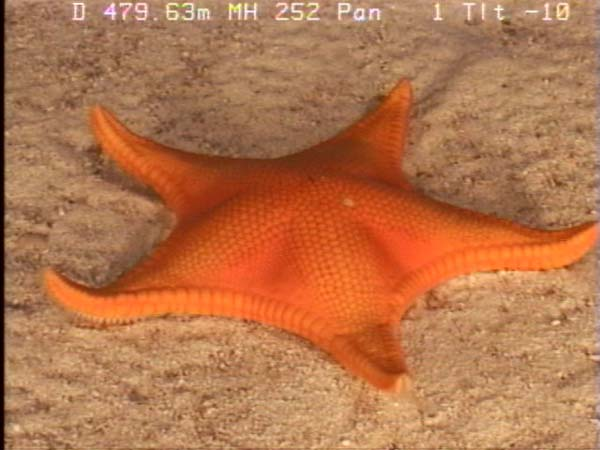
- Pseudarchaster myobrachius

Scientific classification
- Kingdom: Animalia
- Phylum: Echinodermata
- Class: Asteroidea
- Order: Paxillosida
- Family: Pseudarchasteridae; Sladen, 1889

= Pseudarchasteridae =

Family of echinoderms

Pseudarchasteridae is a family of echinoderms belonging to the order Paxillosida.

Genera:

- Gephyreaster Fisher, 1910
- Paragonaster Sladen, 1889
- Perissogonaster Fisher, 1913
- Pseudarchaster Sladen, 1889
- Skiaster Blake & Jagt, 2005
