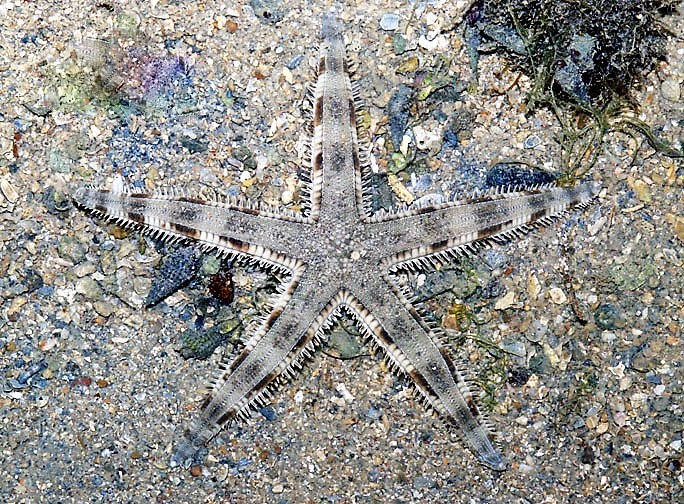
- Common sea star (Archaster typicus)

Scientific classification
- Kingdom: Animalia
- Phylum: Echinodermata
- Class: Asteroidea
- Order: Valvatida
- Family: Archasteridae; Viguier, 1878
- Genus: Archaster; Müller & Troschel, 1840

Species
- See text

= Archaster =

Family of starfishes

Archasteridae is a family of starfish found in shallow waters in the tropical Indo-Pacific region. The genus Astropus, previously included in this family, is now included in the genus Archaster with the single species, Astropus longipes (Gray, 1840), being accepted as Archaster lorioli Sukarno & Jangoux, 1977.

The only genus in the family is now Archaster as three subfamilies have now been raised to family status:

- Subfamily Benthopectininae accepted as Benthopectinidae
- Subfamily Pararchasterinae accepted as Benthopectinidae
- Subfamily Plutonasterinae accepted as Astropectinidae

== Species ==
The following species are listed by the World Register of Marine Species:

Image	Scientific name	Distribution
	Archaster angulatus Müller & Troschel, 1842	East Indies, Philippine, China and south Japan
	Archaster lorioli Sukarno & Jangoux, 1977	Indian Ocean
	Archaster typicus Müller & Troschel, 1840	Indian Ocean and the Indo-Pacific
