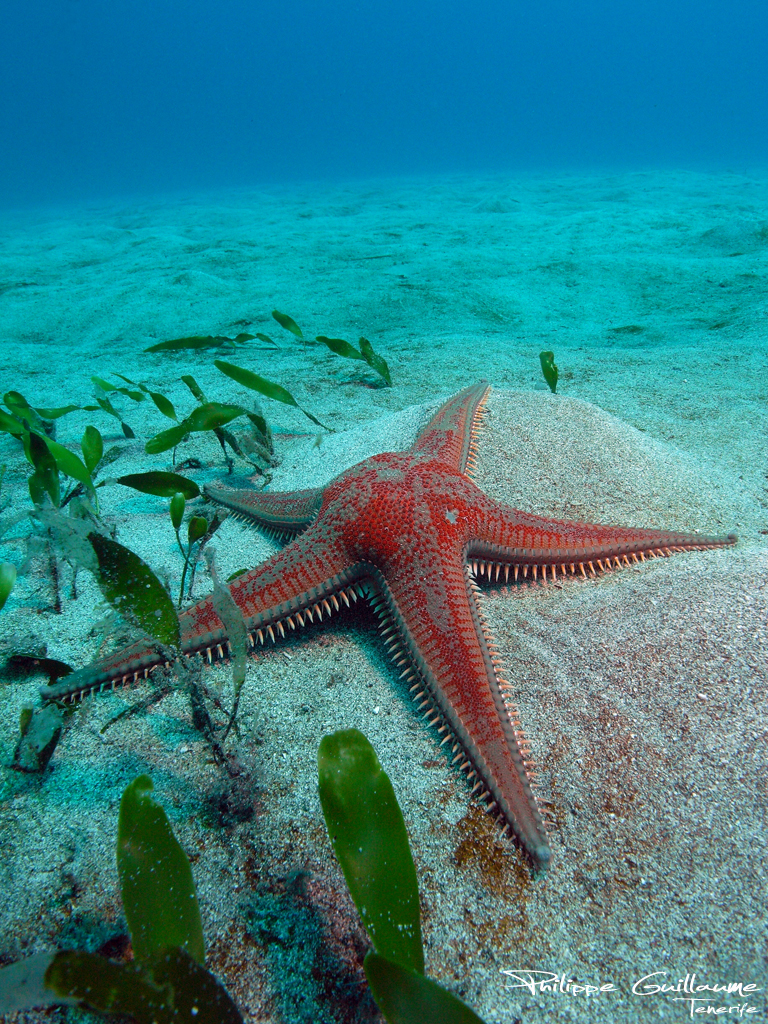
- Astropecten aranciacus

Scientific classification
- Kingdom: Animalia
- Phylum: Echinodermata
- Class: Asteroidea
- Order: Paxillosida
- Family: Astropectinidae; Gray, 1840

Genera
- see text.

= Astropectinidae =

Family of starfishes

The Astropectinidae are a family of sea stars in the order Paxillosida. The starfish are usually found living on the seabed, where they are often partially buried in soft sediment such as sand and mud.

They are not to be confused with species in the genus Archaster, which share similar shape and life habits, but belong to the family Archasteridae (order Valvatida) and can be readily identified by their tube feet having suckers instead of lacking them as in the Astropectinidae.

== Genera ==
There are 27 genera in the family:

- Astromesites Fisher, 1913
- Astropecten Gray, 1840
- Astropectinides Verrill, 1914
- Bathybiaster Danielssen & Koren, 1883
- Blakiaster Perrier, 1881
- Bollonaster McKnight, 1977
- Bunodaster Verrill, 1909
- Craspidaster Sladen, 1889
- Ctenophoraster Fisher, 1906
- Ctenopleura Fisher, 1913
- Dipsacaster Alcock, 1893
- Dytaster Sladen, 1889
- Koremaster Fisher, 1913
- Leptychaster E.A. Smith, 1876
- Lonchotaster Sladen, 1889
- Macroptychaster H.E.S. Clark, 1963
- Mimastrella Fisher, 1916
- Patagiaster Fisher, 1906
- Persephonaster Wood-Mason & Alcock, 1891
- Pentasteria Valette, 1929
- Plutonaster Sladen, 1889
- Proserpinaster Fell, 1963
- Psilaster Sladen, 1885
- Tethyaster Sladen, 1889
- Thrissacanthias Fisher, 1910
- Tritonaster Fisher, 1906
- Trophodiscus Fisher, 1917
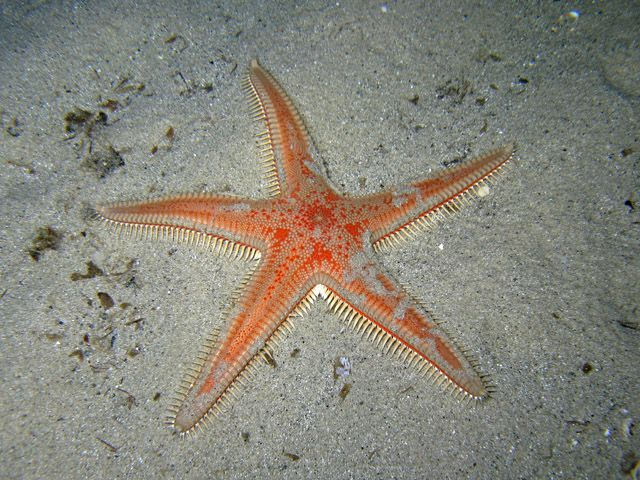
Astropecten aranciacus

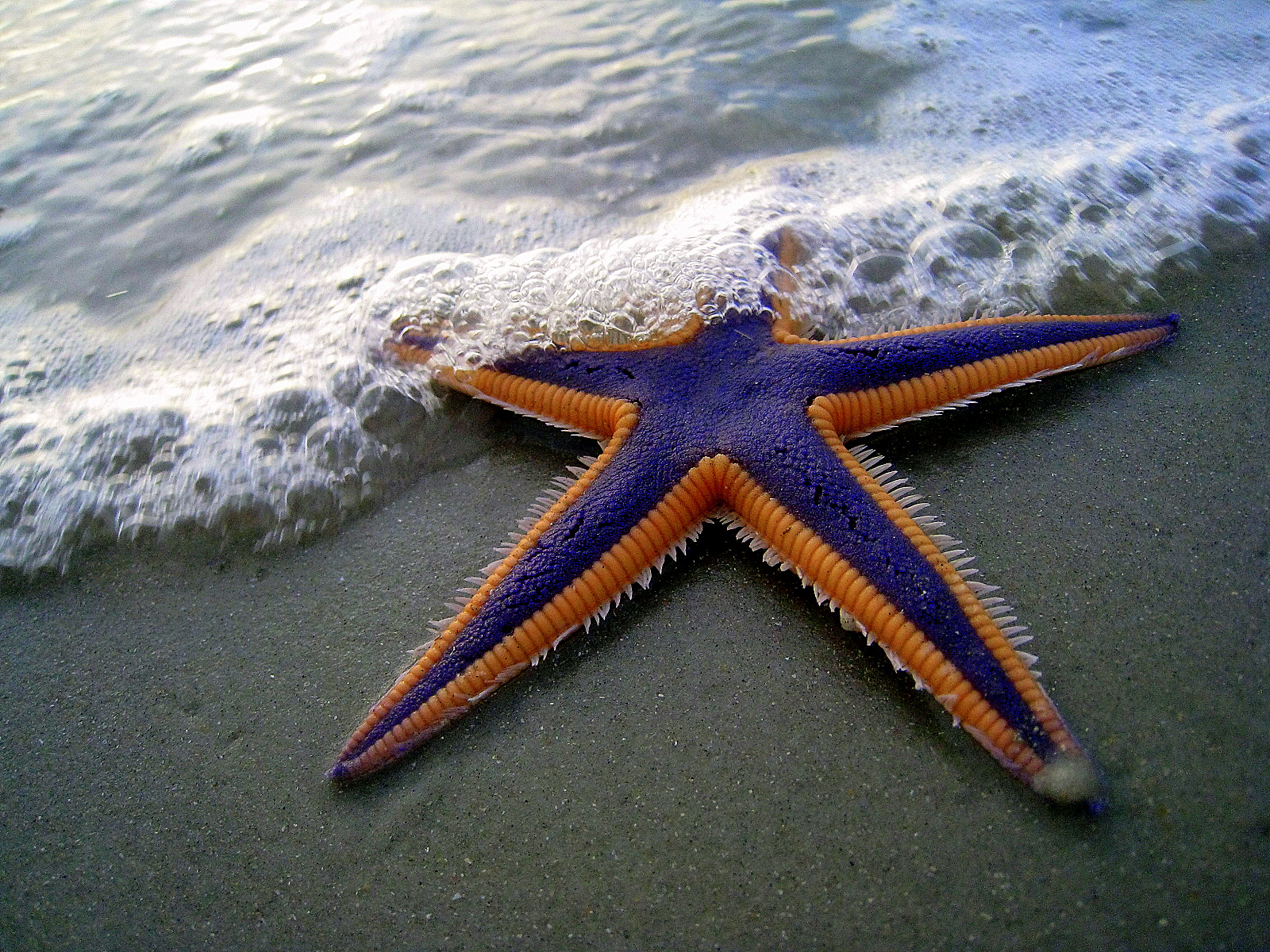
Astropecten articulatus

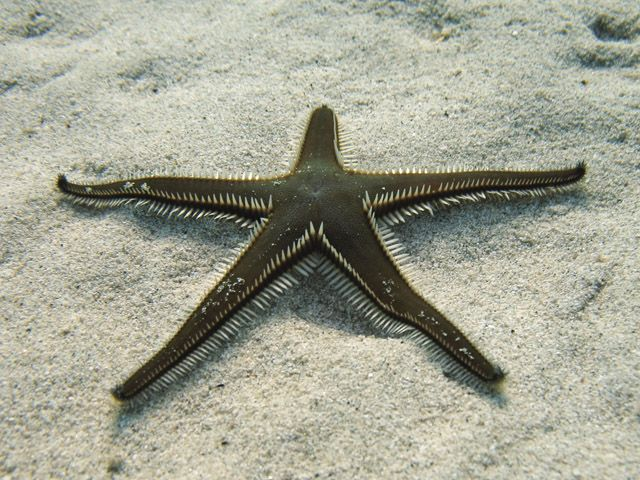
Astropecten bispinosus

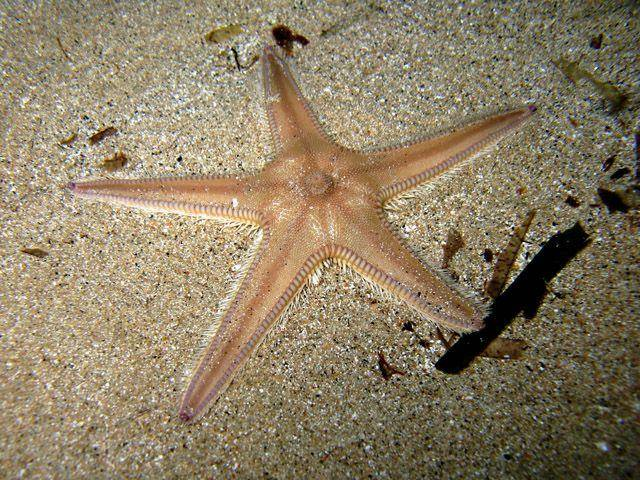
Astropecten irregularis

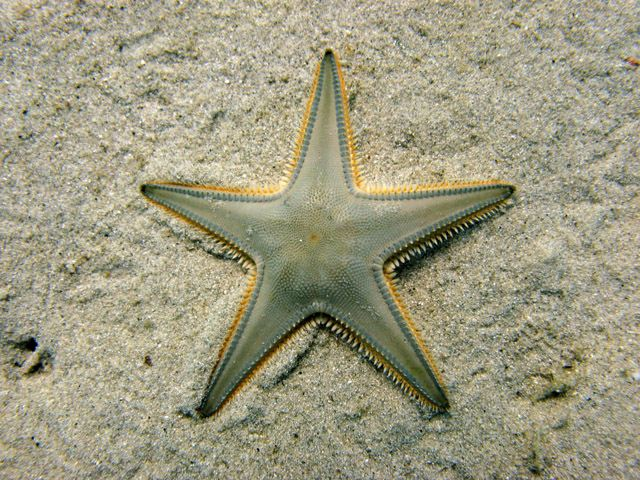
Astropecten jonstoni

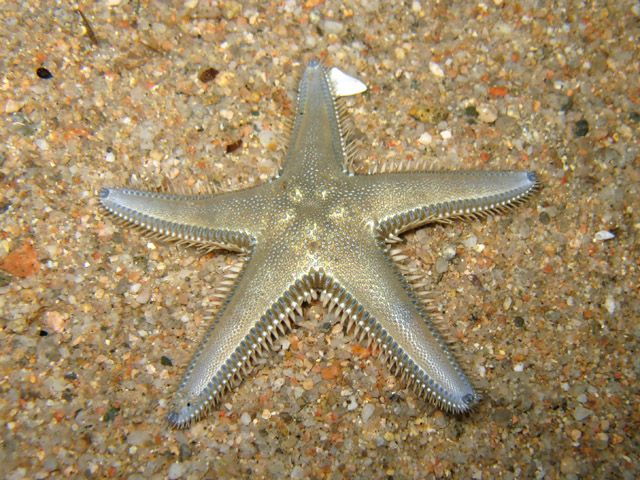
Astropecten platyacanthus

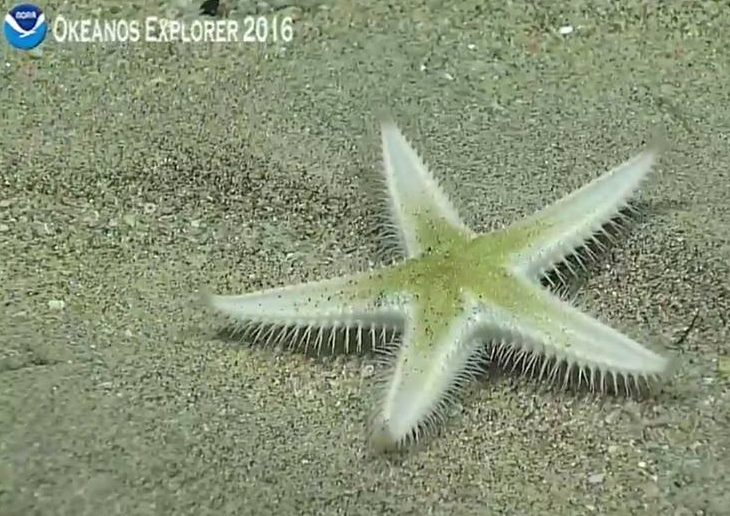
Astropectinides ctenophora

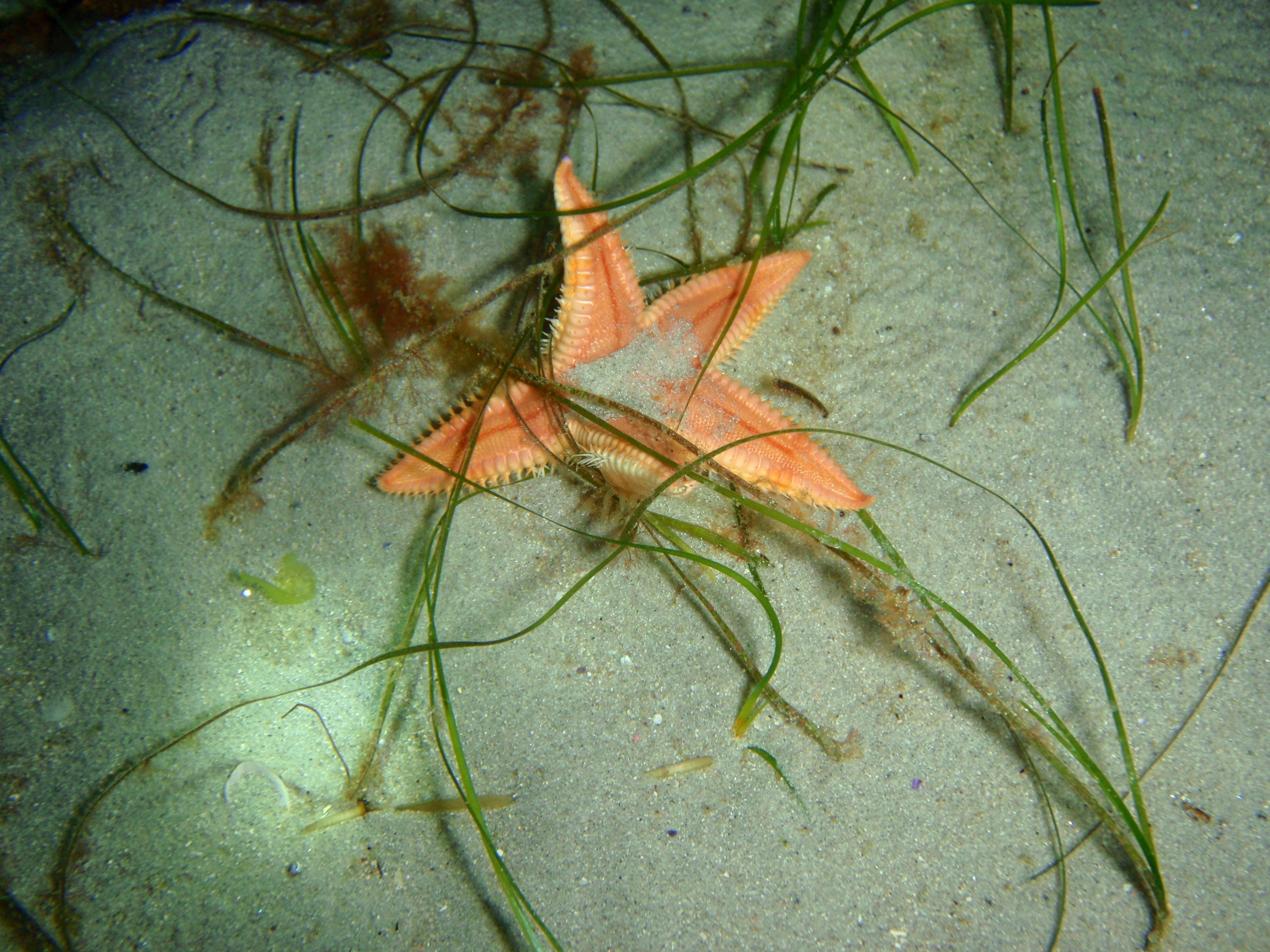
Bollonaster pectinatus

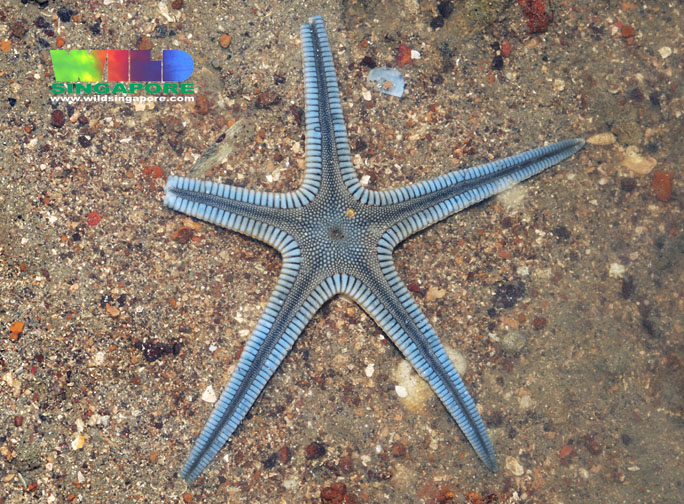
Craspidaster hesperus

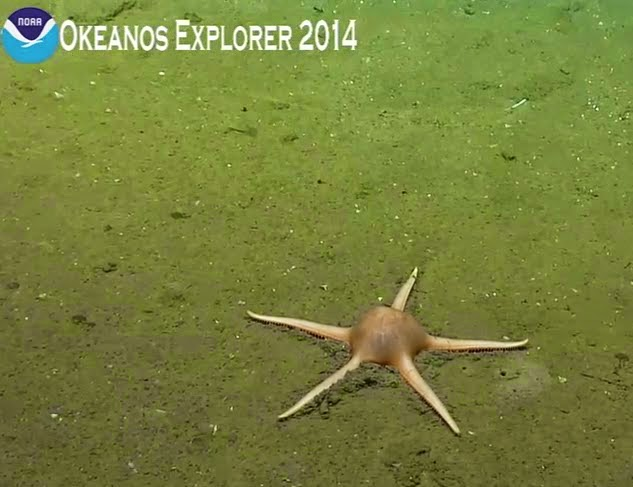
Dytaster insignis

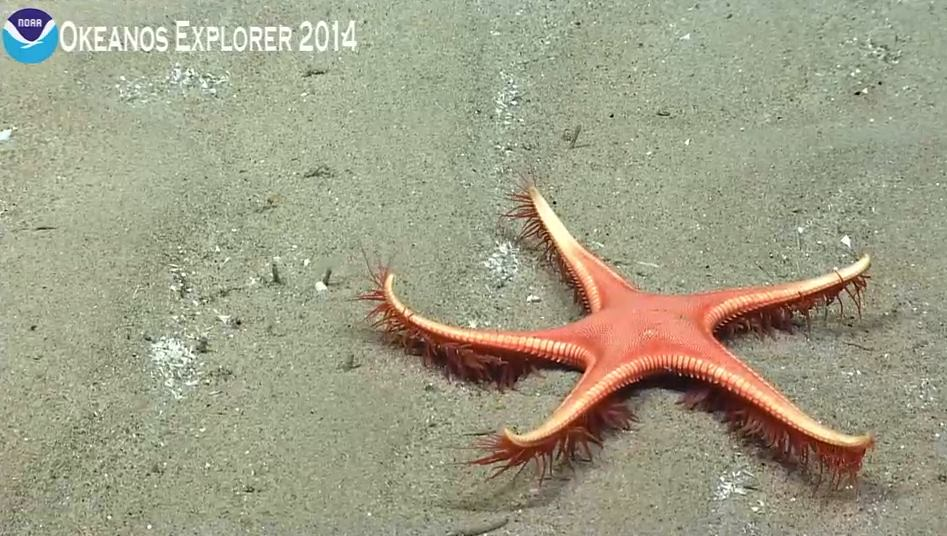
Plutonaster sp.

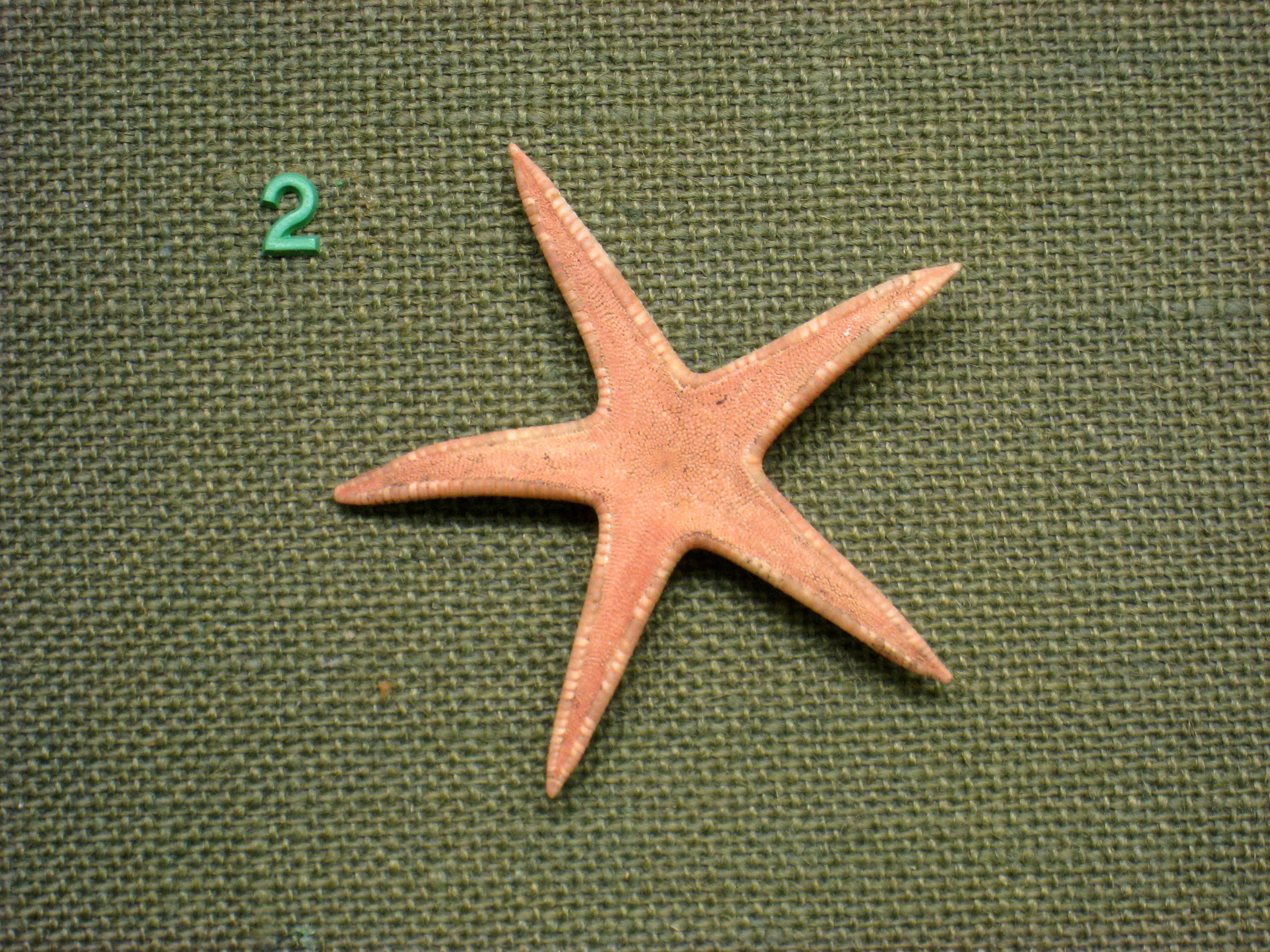
Psilaster andromeda

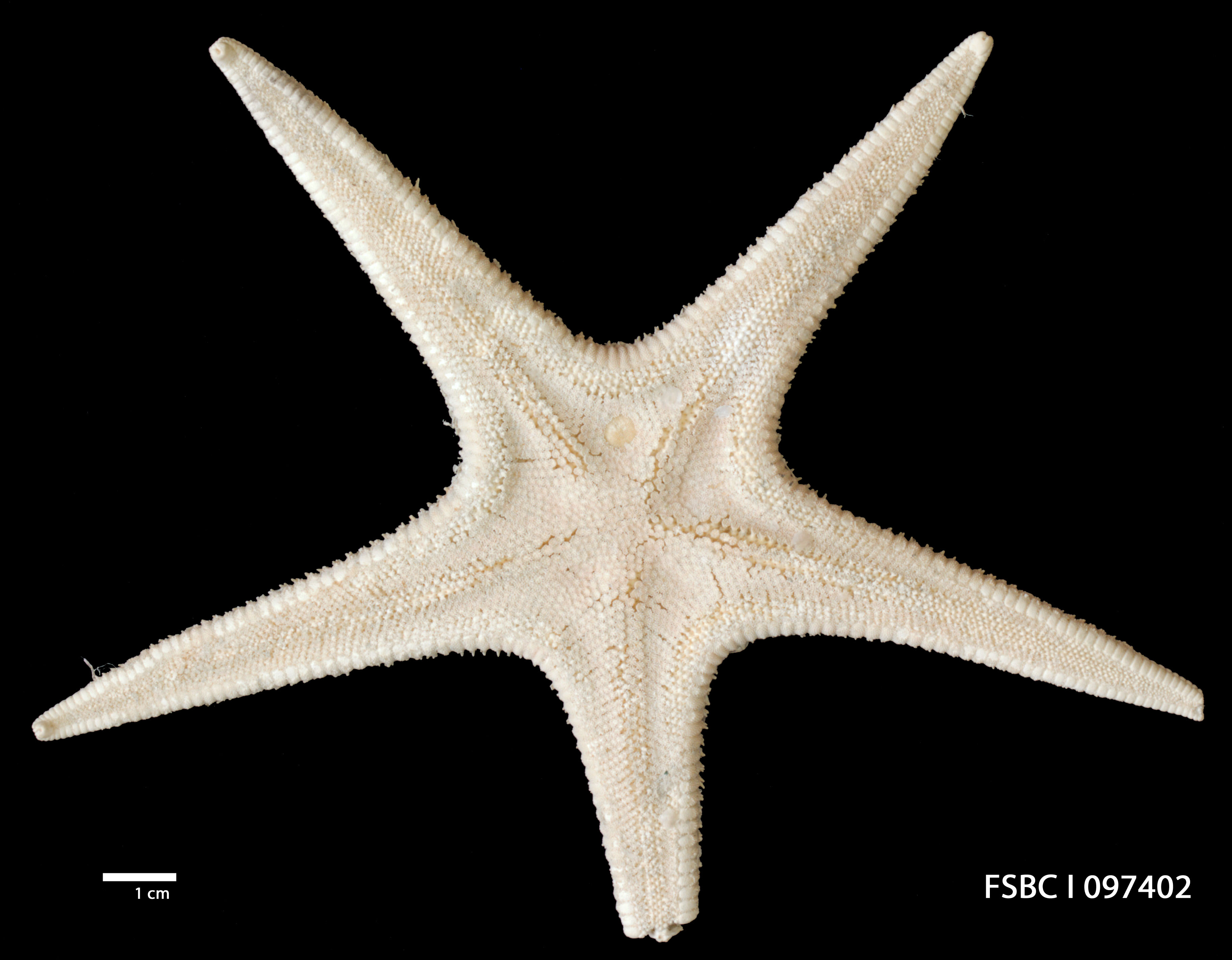
Tethyaster grandis
