= Asexual reproduction in starfish =

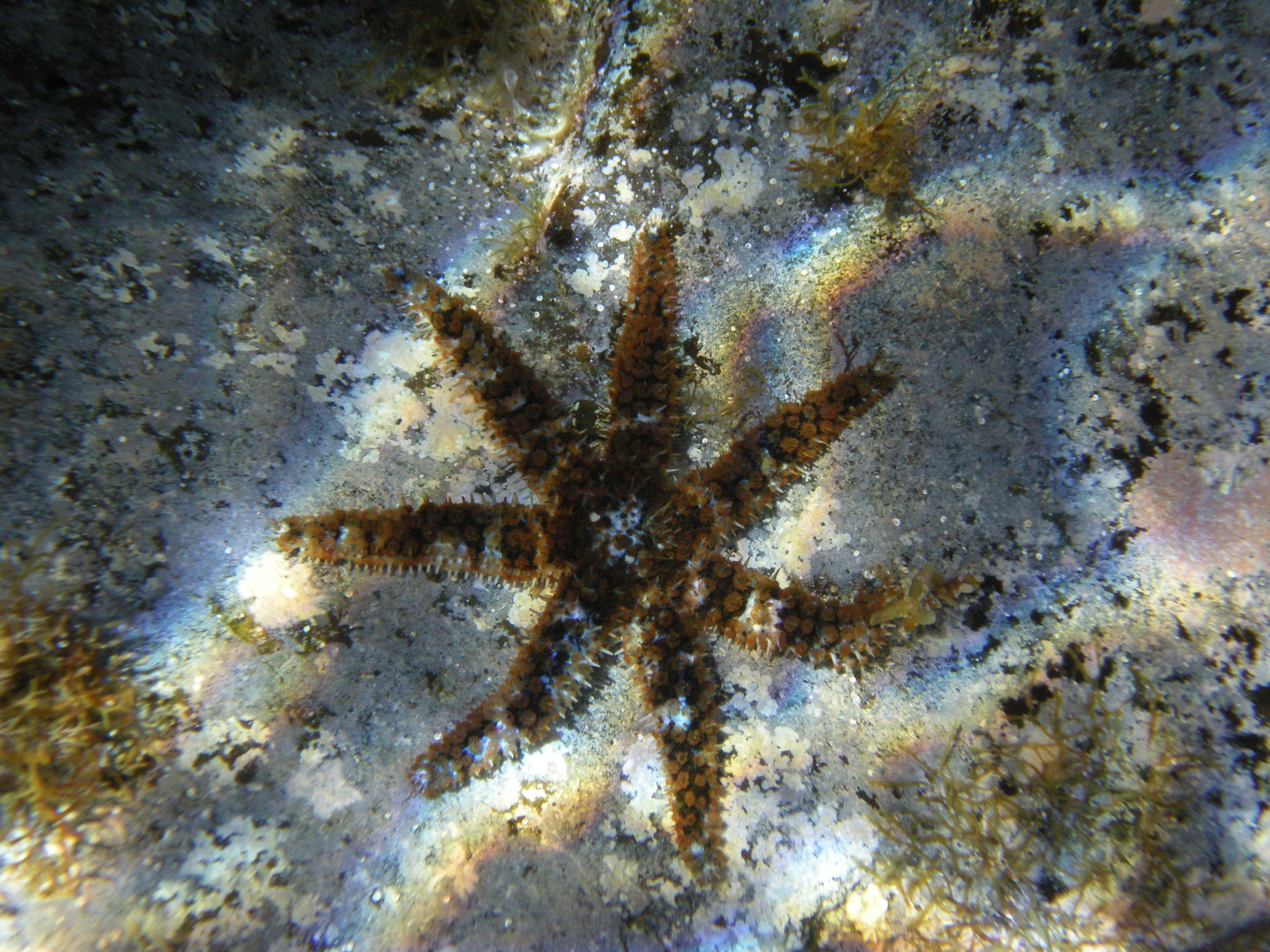
Coscinasterias tenuispina

Asexual reproduction in starfish takes place by fission or through autotomy of arms. In fission, the central disc breaks into two pieces and each portion then regenerates the missing parts. In autotomy, an arm is shed with part of the central disc attached, which continues to live independently as a "comet", eventually growing a new set of arms. Fragmentation occurs on starfishes.

== Fission ==
Fissiparity in the starfish family Asteriidae is confined to the genera Coscinasterias, Stephanasterias and Sclerasterias. Another family in which asexual reproduction by fission has independently arisen is the Asterinidae. The life span is at least four years.

A dense population of Stephanasterias albula was studied at North Lubec, Maine. All the individuals were fairly small, with arm lengths not exceeding 18 mm (0.71 in), but no juveniles were found, suggesting that there had been no recent larval recruitment and that this species may be obligately fissiparous. Fission seemed to take place only in the spring and summer and for any individual, occurred once a year or once every two years.

Another species, Coscinasterias tenuispina, has a variable number of arms but is often found with 7 arms divided into dis-similar sized groups of 3 and 4. It is unclear why fission starts in any particular part of the disc rather than any other, but the origin seemed to bear some relation to the position of the madreporites and the longest arm. This species typically reproduces sexually in the winter and by fission at other times of year. The undivided individual has 1 to 5 madreporites and at least one is found in each offspring. New arms usually appear in groups of 4 and are normally accompanied by the appearance of additional madreporites. The presence of multiple madreporites seems to be a prerequisite of fission. In Brazil, only male individuals have been found and fission takes place all the year round, though primarily in the winter. Fission seems to be correlated with certain stress factors such as particularly low tides, when many starfish may be exposed to the air.

Nepanthia belcheri has a variable number of arms and divides by fission in a similar manner. It is a hermaphrodite, some individuals having gonads that function as testes and others gonads that function as ovaries. After fission, the gonads regress and individuals that previously had mature female gonads become masculinized, developing male-type gonads. Many larger individuals provide evidence from the varying lengths of their arms that they have divided by fission on several occasions.

In Sclerasterias, fissiparity seems to be confined to very young individuals. In these, there is a transitory hexamerous symmetry in what is a normally a pentamerously symmetrical genus. The immature individuals with 6 arms appear so different in appearance from mature individuals with 5 arms that they were at one time considered to be two genera, Hydrasterias and Sclerasterias. Juveniles with arms measuring between 8 mm and 15 mm (occasionally 20 mm) are usually involved in fission and undergo multiple divisions. A sample of 36 young Sclerasterias euplecta of this size was examined. 9 had only 5 arms and did not show evidence of fissiparity while the remainder had 6 arms, usually 3 longer than the other 3, following prior fission. In another sample of juvenile Scierasterias heteropau, the arms were similarly arranged in groups of three and there were 4 madreporites, 2 on the original and 2 on the regenerated section. Active fissiparity seems to be correlated with 6 arms and 4 madreporites. At some stage in their development as yet unexplained, only 5 arms and one madreporite appear, and the ability to divide in this way is lost.

== Autotomy as a means of asexual reproduction ==
=== History ===
Writing in 1872, Lutken suggested that in certain members of the Ophiuroidea, "a radiary division occurs in which cast off arms formed new rays and a disk". Six years later Ernst Haeckel observed that members of the genus Ophidiaster (Linckia) were prone to cast off arms and that new discs, arms, madreporites and mouths formed on the severed surface of these.

In 1904, Kellogg observed numerous severed arms on reefs at Apia, Samoa, noting that many were sprouting new arms and suggested that Linckia diplax and Linckia pacifica had the ability to generate new individuals in this way. He thought the arms might be shed by autotomy. In the same year, Monks showed experimentally that the "comets" developing from the severed arms of Linckia columbiae could indeed grow into new individuals.

=== Autotomy of arms ===
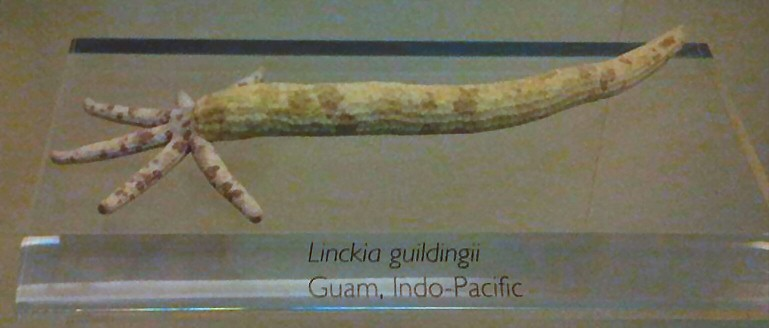
"Comet" of Linckia guildingi

Linckia multifora and Linckia guildingi are two species of starfish found on Hawaii which were found to exhibit autotomy, shedding one or more arms frequently. The arms are known as "comets" and can move about independently and each one can grow into a new individual. Though severed from the nervous system and the water vascular system they still exhibit normal behaviour patterns.

In a study undertaken in Hawaii, it was found that the detachment of an arm was not a sudden event. Most fractures took place about 2.5 cm (1 in) from the disk and started with a small crack appearing on the lower surface of the arm. This spread laterally and upwards towards the dorsal surface. Then the tube feet on the arm and those on the body pulled the two parts of the animal in opposite directions until they parted. The process could take about an hour to complete. The damaged tissue healed in about 10 days and the animal grew a new arm over the course of several months. Breaks took place in various positions on the arm, though Crozier noted a particular breaking zone in Coscinasterias tenuispina. The immediate cause of the autotomy is not always apparent. Of 50 specimens of Linckia multifora brought to the laboratory, 18 had shed one or more arms within 24 hours. The mortality rate of newly severed arms was high, many succumbing to bacterial infection while the wounds were fresh. Once the wound had healed, in about 10 days, survival was more likely.

When arms were severed into several lengths in the laboratory, it was found that those over 1 cm (0.4 in) in length were capable of regenerating. These included the tips of the arms and the central sections with wounds at each end. It takes about 10 months to regenerate a new disk with arms 1 cm (0.4 in) in length. The first development in the regeneration cycle is the formation of a crescent-shaped ridge at the damaged end. Grooves begin to form and a mouth develops at the point from which they radiate. The arms start to form and tube feet begin to appear. As the arms grow the disc begins to develop and eventually a madreporite appears. This process lasts for some time, and about 10 months after separation, the comet has a half disc and 4 arms about 1 cm (0.4 in) long.
