= Starfish regeneration =

Star-shaped organisms

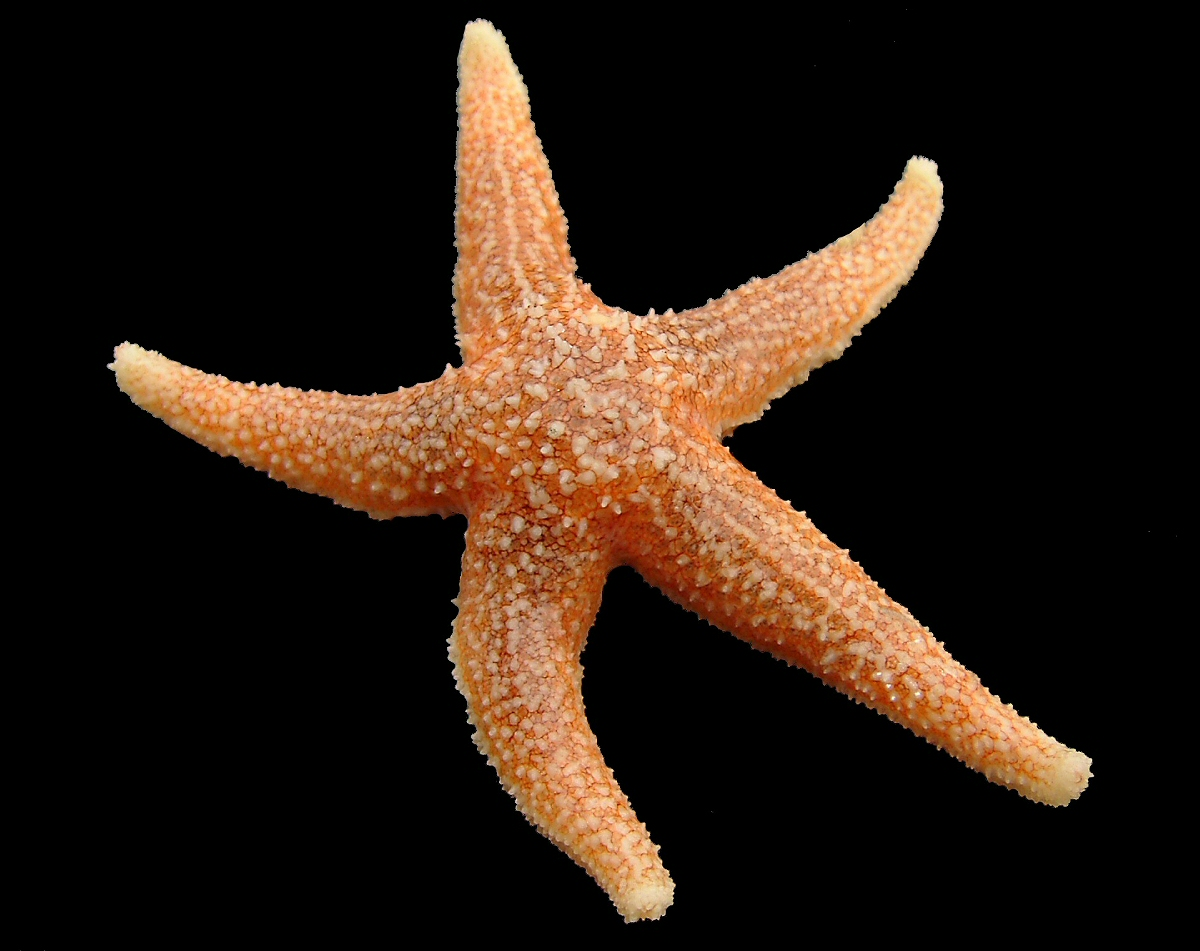
Asterias rubens,- known as the common sea star, is capable of extensive arm regeneration, but will perish if the central disk suffers serious damage.

Starfish, or sea stars, are radially symmetrical, star-shaped organisms of the phylum Echinodermata and the class Asteroidea. Aside from their distinguishing shape, starfish are most recognized for their remarkable ability to regenerate, or regrow, arms and, in some cases, entire bodies. While most species require the central body to be intact in order to regenerate arms, a few tropical species can grow an entirely new starfish from just a portion of a severed limb. Starfish regeneration across species follows a common three-phase model and can take up to a year or longer to complete. Though regeneration is used to recover limbs eaten or removed by predators, starfish are also capable of autotomizing and regenerating limbs to evade predators and reproduce.

Due to their wide range of regenerative capabilities, starfish have become model organisms for studying how the regenerative process has evolved and diversified over time. While the overall morphological processes have been well documented in many starfish, little is known regarding the underlying molecular mechanisms that mediate their regeneration. Moreover, some researchers hope starfish may one day serve as inspiration for therapeutics aiming to expand the extent to which humans can repair and replace damaged cells or tissues.

== Degrees of regeneration ==
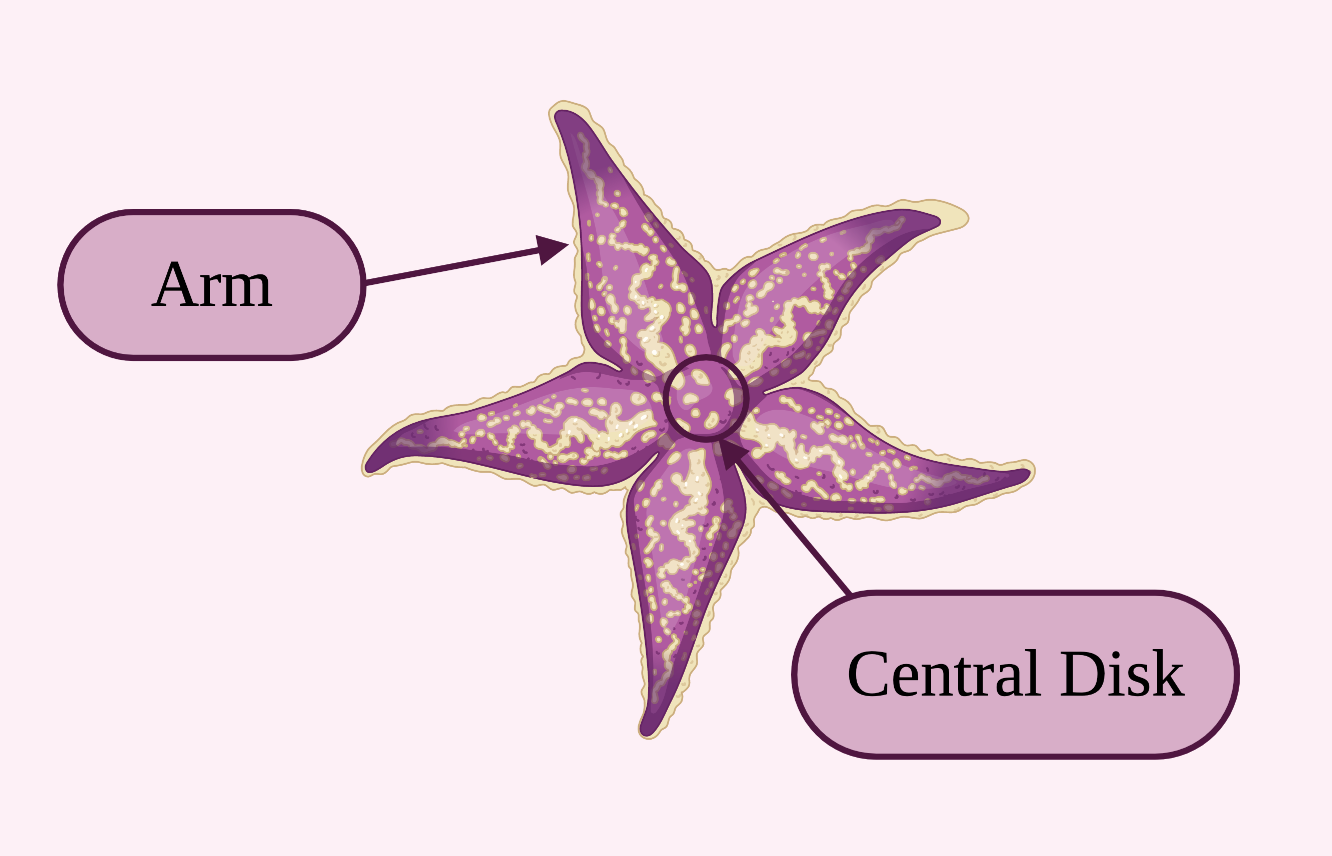
The starfish body plan consists of five to six arms radiating from a central disk.

Regenerative ability differs greatly among starfish species, but can generally be classified within three categories: unidirectional regeneration, disk-dependent bidirectional regeneration, and disk-independent bidirectional regeneration. In each case, regenerative capacity is enabled by the uniquely simple body plan of starfish.

The typical starfish has five or more arms, or "rays", radiating from a central disk. Each arm contains a copy of vital organs and is equipped with eyespots, an eye-like structure that helps the starfish differentiate between light and darkness, and tube feet, which enable locomotion. All organs connect to the digestive system in the central disk, which also contains the starfish mouth and stomach. This replication and delocalization of vital organs makes starfish especially resilient to the loss of appendages. In addition to being able to replicate organs, starfish are also capable of regenerating neuron cells. Other cells that are left over from the injury are able to become neural cells and take up functions they would not normally do. Following injury or amputation, a star fish can survive with its remaining organ copies during the period of regeneration, which ranges from a few months to over a year.

=== Unidirectional regeneration ===
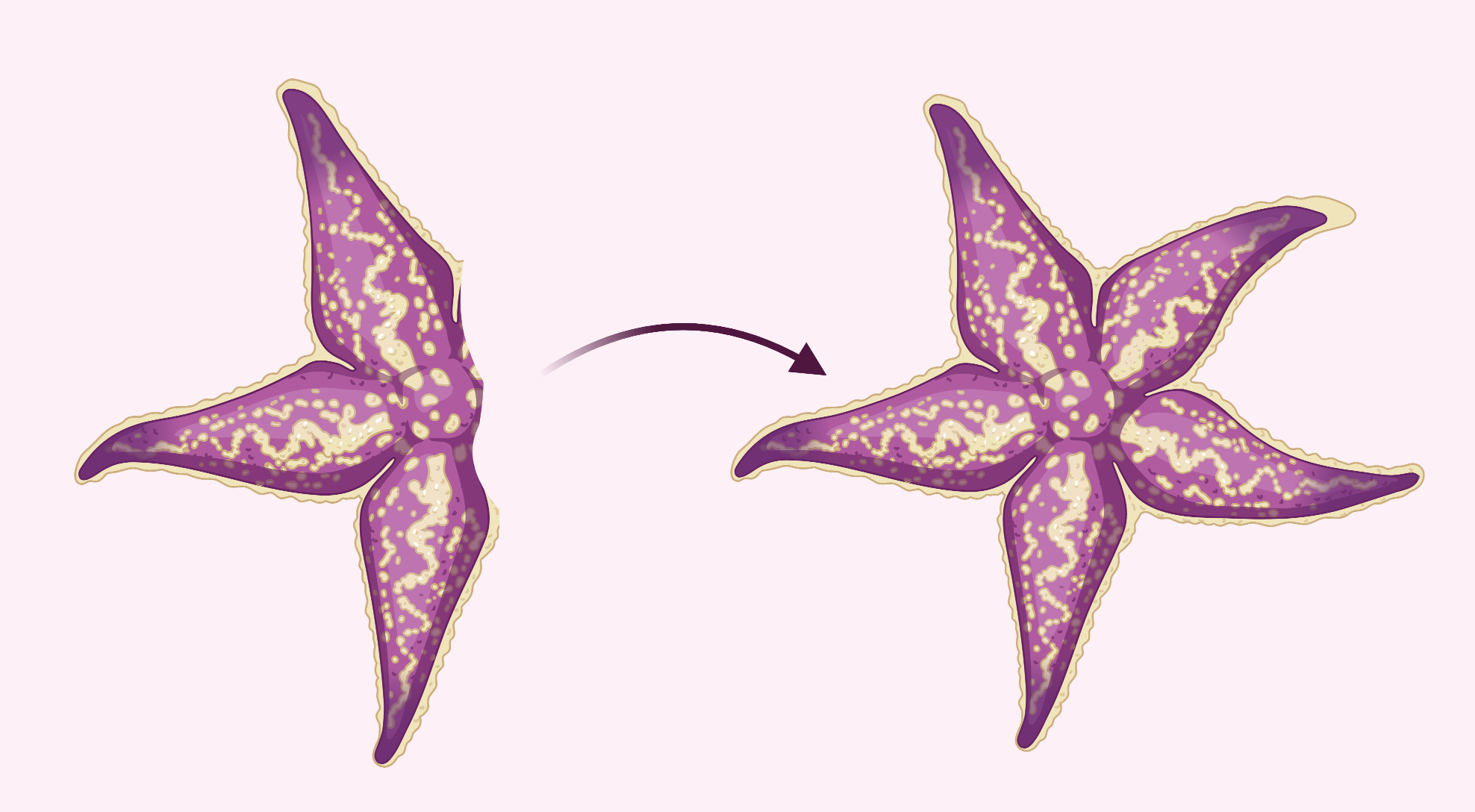
After the loss of 2 arms, starfish capable of unidirectional regeneration can regenerate both limbs.

Though the different Asteroidea species show a great range of variation in regeneration capabilities, an overwhelming number of them have the ability to regenerate lost limbs and tube feet. Star fish that exhibit unidirectional regeneration, or regeneration that is restricted to a single direction, are capable of regenerating multiple lost limbs from a disk containing half or more of the original starfish. Unidirectional regeneration is the simplest form of regeneration as the majority of the disk is intact, allowing the starfish to eat, move, and escape predators during the regeneration period. Unidirectional regeneration is also the most common form of regeneration exhibited by starfish as single arms are often removed by predators or shed through autotomy.

Crown-of-thorns starfish (Acanthaster planci), which feed on large swaths of coral reefs in the Indo-Pacific, are notable unidirectional regenerators. Starfish of this invasive species are extremely difficult to eradicate because of their ability to regrow when half or more of the original starfish is intact. Thus, initial population control efforts championed by fishermen and conservationists in the 1960s, which involved sectioning and releasing caught starfish, may have unknowingly exacerbated population outbreaks in the western Pacific coral reefs.

=== Disk-dependent bidirectional regeneration ===
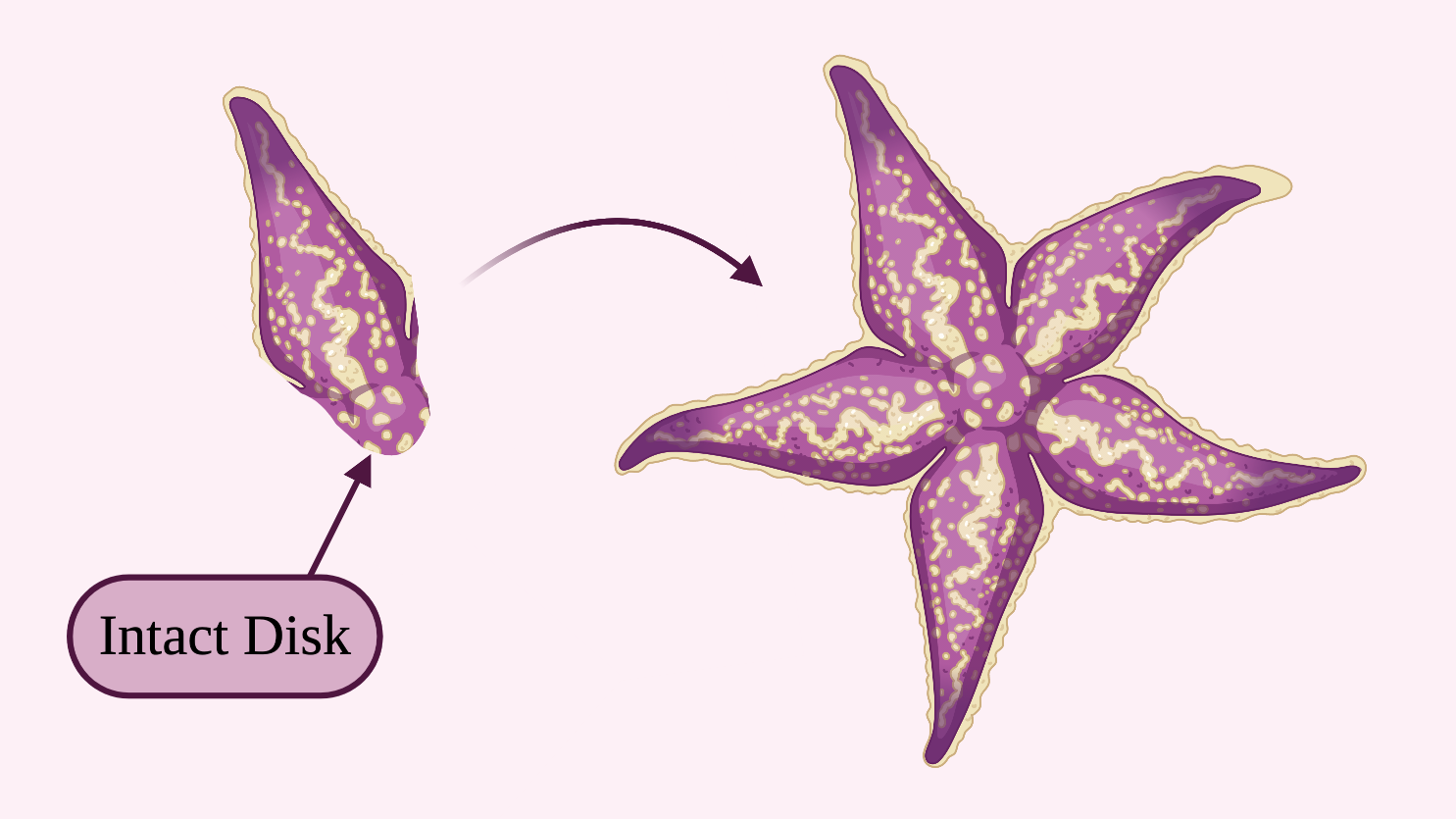
In Disk-Dependent Bidirectional Regeneration, starfish can regenerate their full body given that the disk is intact.

Bidirectional regeneration is a robust form of regeneration defined by the ability to regrow the main body axis after whole body severance. Starfish that exhibit disk-dependent bidirectional regeneration are capable of regenerating a full starfish when less than half of the original starfish is intact, given that all or part of the central disk is present. The presence of the central disk gives the detached limb access to its original digestive system and mouth, allowing the starfish to move to find food, eat, and hide from predators during recovery.

=== Disk-independent bidirectional regeneration ===
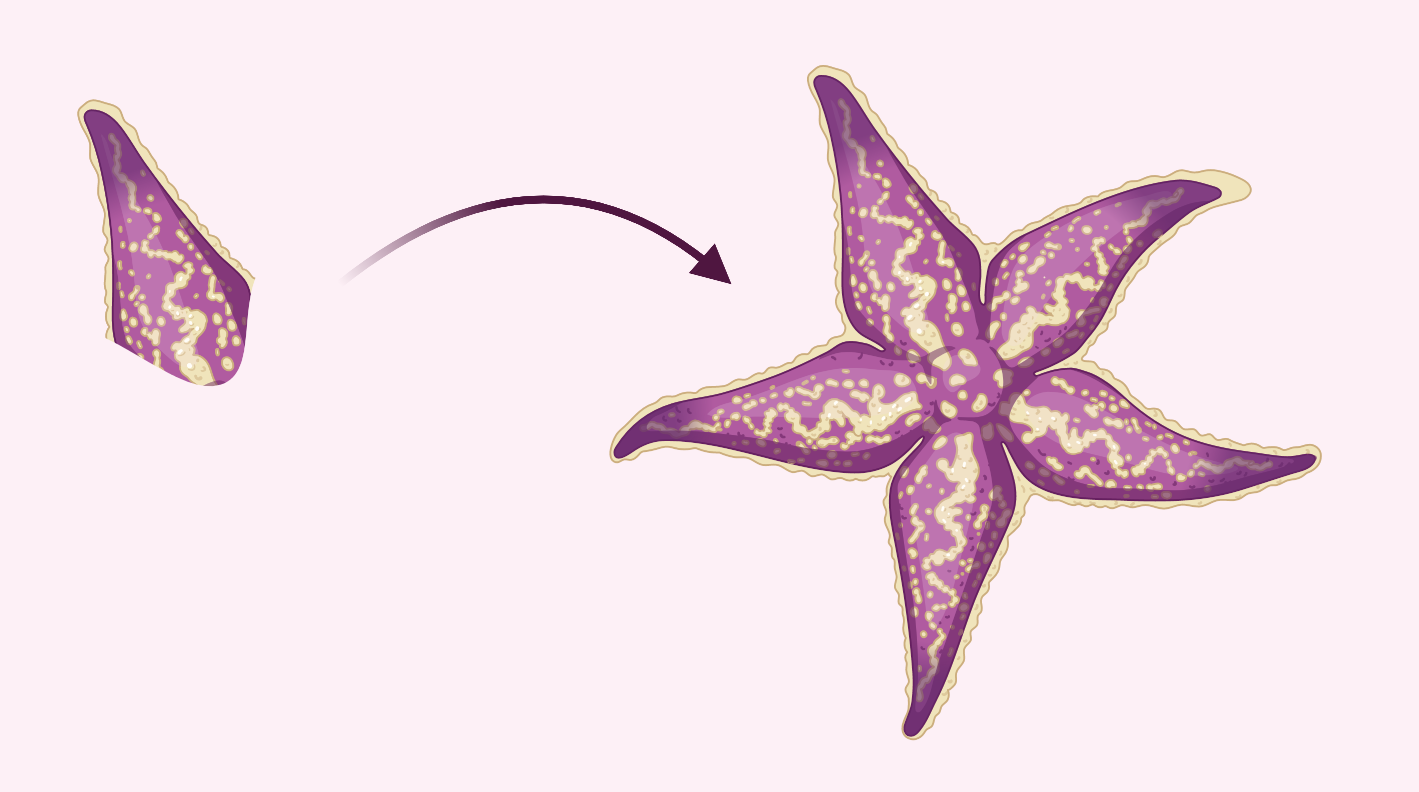
In Disk-Independent Bidirectional Regeneration, starfish can regenerate their full body without the presence of any central disk.

The most extensive form of regeneration exhibited by starfish species is disk-independent bidirectional regeneration. In this rare case, a detached starfish limb with no remnants of the central disk is capable of regenerating a full starfish, referred to as a comet form. In the absence of a mouth or digestive system, the detached arm survives on nutrients stored in the arm until it can regenerate a disk. Without the ability to feed during recovery, disk independent bidirectional regeneration is difficult to execute and requires that the detached arm is in a relatively healthy form. This vigorous form of regeneration has been identified in Linckia species to a very high degree.

== Regeneration phases ==
Regeneration is an intrinsically conservative post-embryonic developmental process that repairs and replaces cells, tissues, organs, and body parts of a given organism. Furthermore, the arm regenerative process of all starfish species studied to date can be subdivided into three distinct phases: a repair phase, an early regenerative phase, and an advanced regenerative phase. Although diversity exists among starfish in terms of their physiology, morphology, and amputation susceptibility, a generalized regenerative process can be appreciated. Throughout the regeneration process, the coelomic epithelium is vital. This is a tissue that plays a large role in the formation of new limbs and new organs. Note, the following section details the regrowth of a starfish's arm following amputation in a unidirectional manner of regeneration.

=== Repair phase ===
Immediately following amputation, all starfish must seal their coelomic cavities, particularly the perivisceral coelomic canal, to prevent fluid loss and the entrance of foreign pathogens. This is initially achieved by an emergency mechanism in which the entire arm wall contracts swiftly and powerfully to form a 'hemostatic ring' of sorts.

Additionally, in a process analogous to mammalian platelet clot formation, a morphologically heterogenous population of coelomocytes help prevent the loss of body fluid by forming a clot of cells at the injured perivisceral coelomic canal. Coelomocytes are free-wandering cells that circulate the coelomic fluid, possessing phagocytic, clotting, and cytotoxic functions in most echinoderms. These coelomocytes not only form clots at starfish amputation sites but also help clear the wound site of debris and foreign microorganisms via phagocytosis.

Re-epithelialization occurs within the first 48 hours post-amputation, in the middle of the repair phase. Interestingly, in contrast to most mammals, starfish accomplish re-epithelialization without any immediate proliferation of epidermal progenitor cells at the wound edge or wound epithelium. Rather, epidermal cells are stretched inwards from the wound edge, expanding centripetally until a continuous layer is formed. Of note, these stretched epidermal cells maintain their cell-cell junctions in starfish, whereas in mammals, junctional complexes are disrupted to allow the migration of keratinocytes over the wound. Subsequently, the wound epithelium becomes increasingly differentiated, thicker, and permanent. Moreover, in some starfish species, such as Echinaster sepositus and Acanthaster planci, a phagocytic syncytium transiently supports the migration of epithelial cells while protecting injured stump tissue from fluid loss and foreign entities.

Finally, the end of the repair phase is marked by the formation of a temporary edematous area below the newly established epithelial layer. Overall, this provisional tissue matures over time, to ultimately provide a scaffold for regenerative growth. In many ways, the edematous area resembles the granulation tissue of mammals, possessing a disorganized mix of fibroblasts, phagocytes, nervous elements, differentiating myocytes, and undifferentiated cells. Early on, phagocytes clear the edematous area of foreign material and degrade leftover debris. Meanwhile, fibroblasts develop the extracellular matrix (ECM) and pockets of collagen fibril. The area progressively matures over the span of about a week, ultimately containing a more organized extracellular matrix, dispersed collagen fibril bundles, nerve elements, early pigment cells, and other differentiated or undifferentiated cells.

=== Early regenerative phase ===
The early regenerative phase begins once the injury has healed, and is characterized by an exodus of dedifferentiating myocytes from various anatomical structures towards the regenerating tip. Throughout this phase, the regenerating coelomic cavities serve as a physical driving force of regrowth. Notably, excess fluid secretion from the coelomic epithelia produces a hypertrophic appearance in the regenerating tip of the coelomic cavities. This hypertrophic state, in turn, produces a pressure that supports the regrowth of canals, particularly the perivisceral coelom and the radial water canal. In addition, the pressure creates a turgidity that physically supports the regenerate's shape until skeleton and muscle formation can occur.

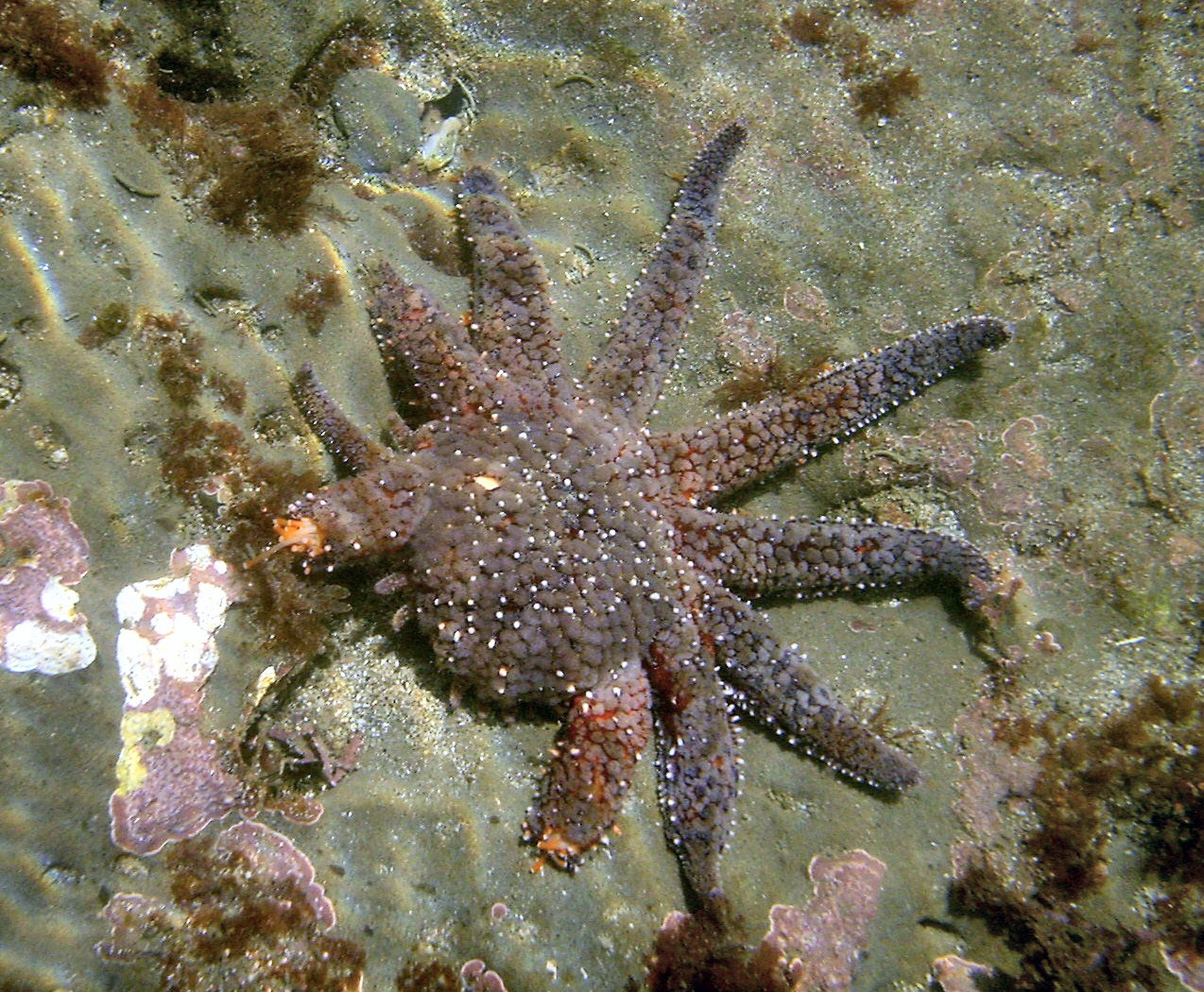
A Sunflower Starfish (Pycnopodia helianthoides) undergoes regeneration after losing numerous arms.

The early regenerative phase is marked by a large mobilization of various cytotypes from different locations (like the coelomic cavities) towards the edematous regenerating region. This proximal to distal migration of cells supports the outgrowth of the radial nerve cord from any existing nerve cord remaining post amputation. Intriguingly, the radial nerve cord and radial water canal (the only two structures that run continuously along the arm) occur in tandem and potentially include an inductive cross-talk relationship. However, it is not currently known which structure induces regrowth and differentiation of the other. Furthermore, initial regeneration of the radial nerve cord results from proliferation of existing structure as well as the differentiation of supporting cells that create cell 'niches' for future neuronal growth. Specifically, the supporting cells (believed to be glial cells) acquire a bipolar shape, implanting opposing cytoplasmic extensions containing regenerative intermediate filament bundles. Niches result from these extensions and house interspersed neurons over time.

A blastema-like region also appears during this phase composed of undifferentiated and barely differentiated cells amongst the epidermal tissue and coelom outgrowths (radial water canal and radial nerve cord). Moreover, the perivisceral coelom funnels undifferentiated cells to the blastema-like formation. Unlike a true blastema, this blastema-like area lacks localization, contains an abundant ECM, and houses organized fiber bundles of collagen. As such, while starfish generally follows a morphallactic process of regrowth, the regenerative mechanisms fall somewhere in between a true morphallactic and epimorphic model, in reality.

Early skeletogenesis also begins during the early regenerative phase as plates of calcium carbonite deposit into the collagen network developing in the former edematous area. Importantly, near the end of the phase, a small regenerate appears. While less organized than the starfish stump, the regenerate houses the beginnings of a transverse meshwork of collagen fibers, differentiated ossicles, and stereom. Moreover, the pressurized radial water canal starts regenerating the terminal tube foot. This is the first defined structure to regenerate, as cells flow from the inner coelomic walls to the lumen of the tube feet, where they differentiate amongst rearranging muscles.

=== Advanced regenerative phase ===
The last phase – known as the advanced regenerative phase – consists of extensive morphogenesis and differentiation of numerous tissues across the regenerate. The small regenerate that emerges from the early regenerative phase will morph into a miniature starfish arm come 3–6 months post amputation. This miniaturized arm will resemble the non-regenerating arms of the starfish, and will continue growing throughout the organism's lifetime.

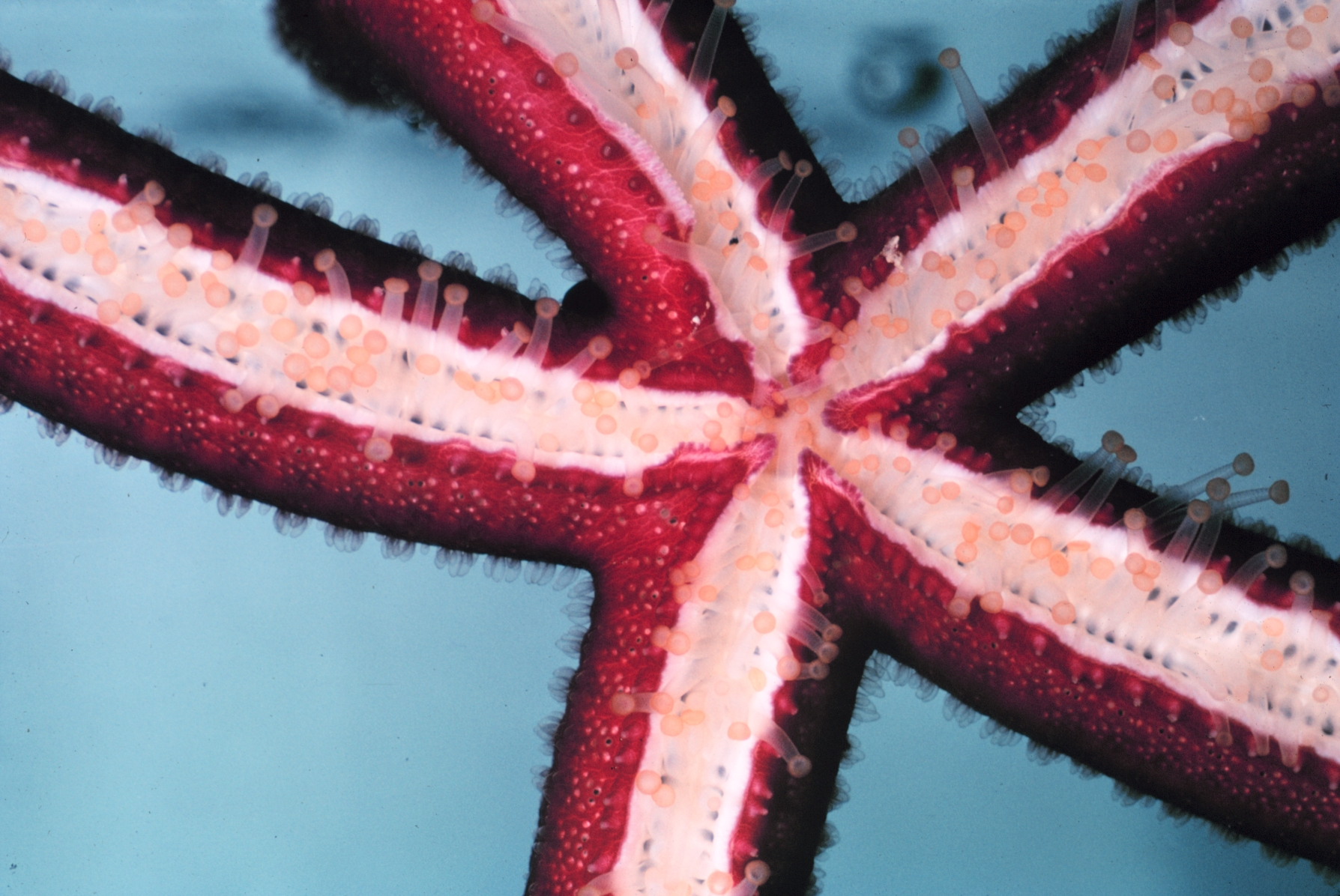
The underside view of a starfish, exemplifying its extensive network of tube feet. In starfish, the distal-most tube foot is the first structure to regenerate post-amputation.

Importantly, and especially evident in the last phase, starfish re-growth follows a "distalization-intercalary" regenerative model after arm amputation. In this model, the organism first forms the most distal (far away from the stump) structure during regeneration. This new structure, in turn, behaves as a signaling center to organize the development of new structures in relation to old stump tissue. Subsequently, regenerated tissues manifest – or, more accordingly, intercalate – between the limb's stump and the newly formed distal structure. As noted above, the terminal tube foot is the first defined structure to appear, serving as the distal signaling center that coordinates subsequent regeneration in a proximal to distal direction.

Massive myogenesis (formation of muscular tissue) occurs throughout the advanced regenerative phase. Majority of the muscles regenerate via the same mechanism: dedifferentiated cells from the coelomic body cavity travel towards the regenerating starfish tip before re-differentiating into muscle components. Meanwhile, a basal lamina gradually develops around the forming muscle tissue to separate it from the coelomic cavities. In this manner, terminal tube foot formation is followed by the growth of additional tube feet, ampullae, aboral ossicles, and other musculoskeletal structures in a proximal to distal direction until regeneration is completed.

Cellular differentiation and completion of the main nervous components take place in the regenerate during this phase. For example, function is regained in the radial nerve cord as it finishes development. Additionally, a densely packed region of glial cells, dendrites, and axons called the neuropil zone reappears. Over time, pigment-cupped photoreceptors called ocelli develop, leading to the full restoration of the optic cushion (collection of ocelli). Notwithstanding, the specific mechanisms of neurogenesis throughout this phase remain relatively unknown: the exact role of stem cell, dedifferentiation, and cellular differentiation requires further exploration.

== Autotomy and regeneration ==
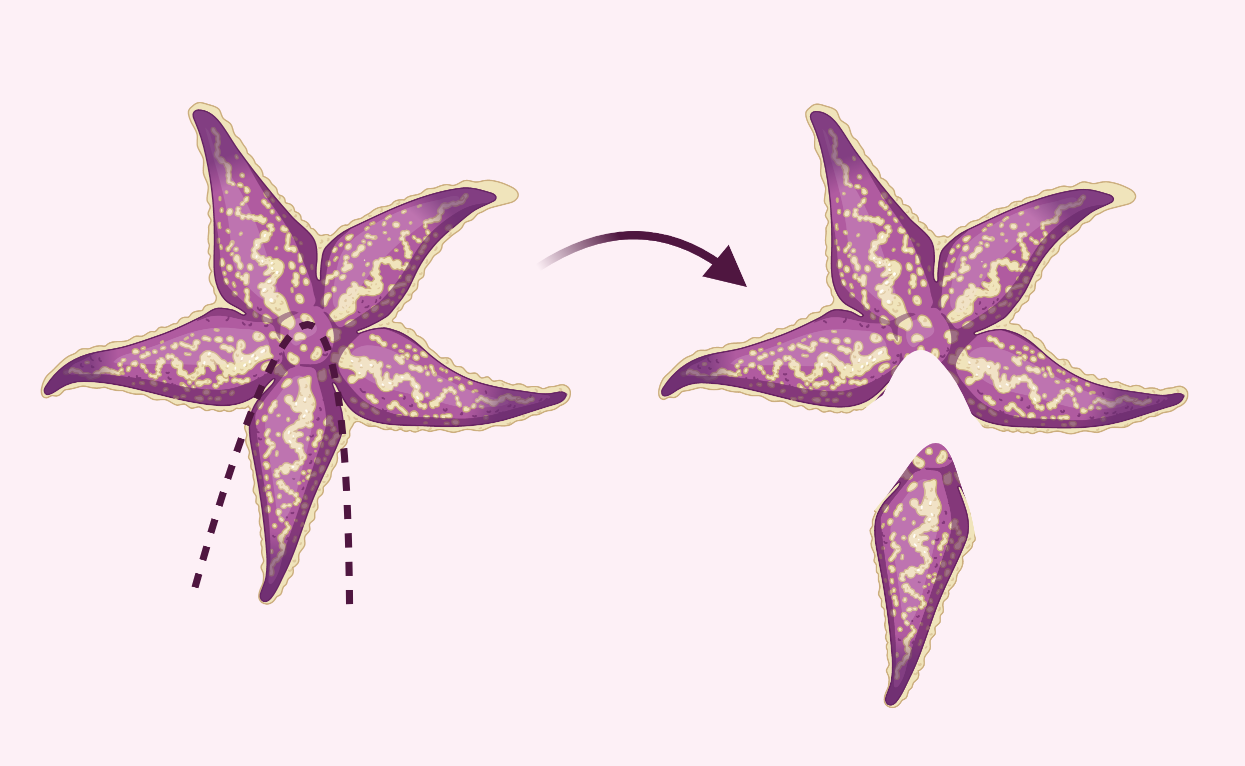
During autotomy a starfish sheds an arm typically with part of the central disk attached. This arm regenerates into a full starfish identical to the original.

Though starfish are well understood to utilize their regenerative capabilities to regrow arms eaten or damaged by predators, they are also capable of regenerating arms they have intentionally shed through a process known as autotomy. Researchers propose that autotomy mediated regeneration may play a role in predator evasion as well as both sexual and asexual reproduction.

=== Predator evasion ===
Autotomy is understood to serve a defensive function in starfish. While arms can be pulled off the starfish body by predators, the starfish can choose to shed its arm in order to evade danger. If the detached limb is eaten or extremely damaged, bidirectional regeneration is unlikely. There are two ways a starfish can lose its limbs from predators. The loss of limbs includes losing an entire limb or multiple from large prey, or flesh being eaten away by smaller prey. Large prey can eat the starfish whole, whereas smaller prey will turn over a starfish and eat at their soft flesh. Although it is unlikely for bidirectional regeneration, the original starfish can regenerate its lost arm or arms through unidirectional regeneration.

=== Sexual reproduction ===
Starfish sexually reproduce through spawning, meaning that sex cells (eggs and sperm) are released into the water and fertilized outside of the body. Each arm contains gonads that swell with eggs and sperm in female and male starfish, respectively. Early observations of Labidiaster starfish found that autotomized arms were swollen with mature eggs, suggesting that autotomy may be utilized for sexual propagation. Under this theory, starfish shed their arms in order to increase the range of egg dispersion and thus increase the possibility of eggs being fertilized by neighboring male starfish. Once the egg has been fertilized a blastula is formed. After the formation of the blastula cilia is produced on the cell allowing the cell to move through the water. When the cell later turns into larva, the starfish larva will start to produce its organs before turning into an adult starfish. The host starfish then regenerates the lost arm through unidirectional regeneration. This theory is challenged by two findings in Lamarck starfish. The first being that very young Lamarck starfish with underdeveloped gonads exhibit autonomy, and the second being that in Hawaii, Lamarck starfish shed arms throughout the year irrespective of spawning season.

=== Asexual reproduction ===
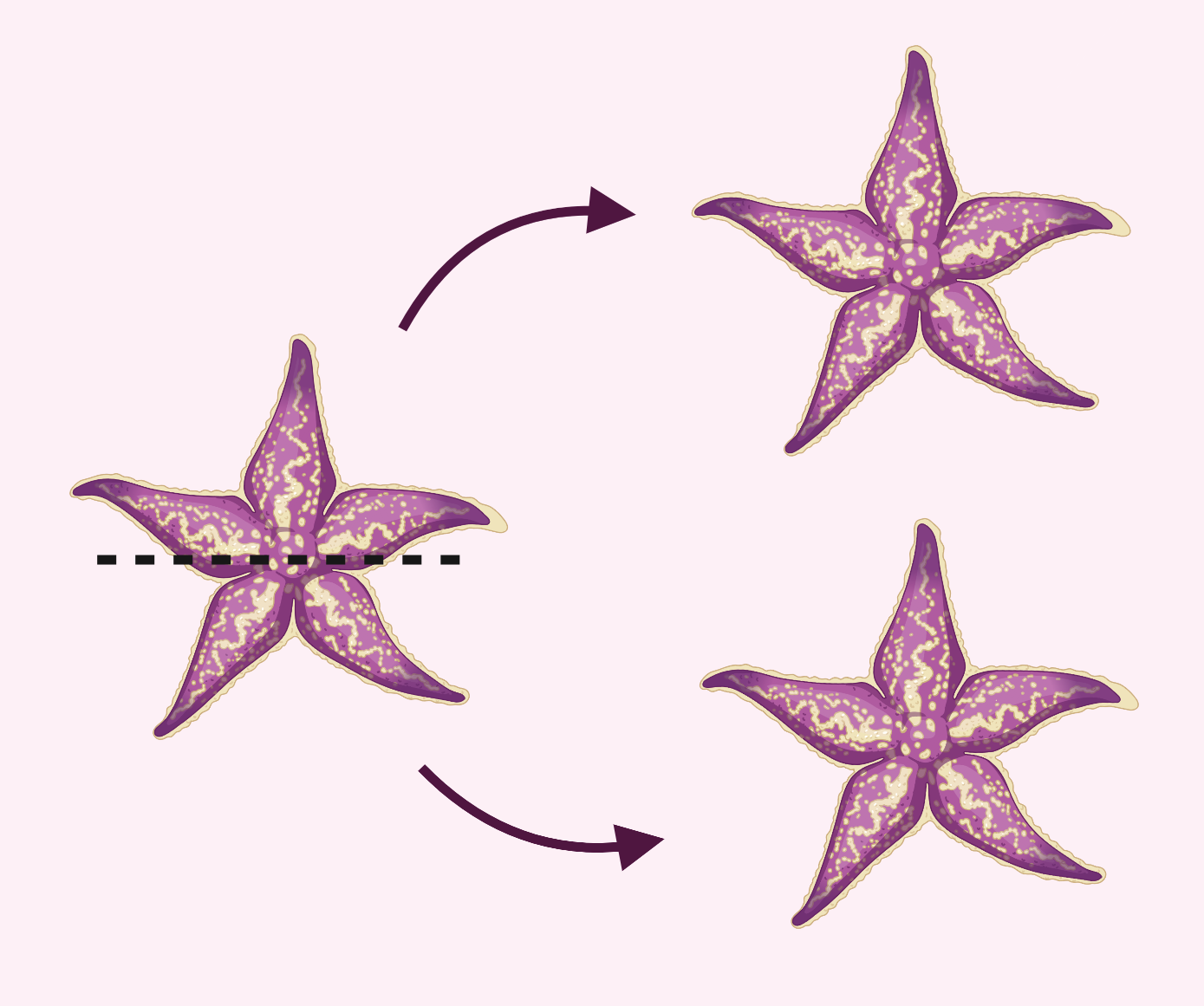
In Disk-Independent Bidirectional Regeneration, starfish can regenerate their full body without the presence of any central disk.

In asexual starfish reproduction, starfish develop offspring identical to the parent. This can be achieved through arm autotomy or fission. In arm autotomy, starfish typically shed arms with part of the central disk attached. This arm regenerates into a full starfish identical to the original through disk-dependent bidirectional regeneration. In some species, disk independent bidirectional regeneration is utilized to produce new starfish. Several species also produce larvae that are capable of asexual reproduction prior to adulthood through autotomy and budding.

A less commonly used form of asexual reproduction is fissiparity, reproduction via the division of the disk. This phenomenon is observed in various degrees in the genres Coscinasterias, Stephanasterias, and Sclerasterias. In Sclerasterian starfish, fission is restricted to young organisms, while Coscinasterian and Stephanasterian starfish maintain this ability into adulthood. Six-armed starfish capable of fission split their disk into two three-arm halves that both regenerate into a six-armed starfish. Starfish with seven arms are split into a three-arm and four-arm halves, which both regenerate into a seven arm starfish.

== See also ==
- Starfish
- Echinoderm
- Regeneration (biology)
- Water vascular system
- Wound healing
