= L. ehrenbergii =

L. ehrenbergii may refer to:

- Lemboglossum ehrenbergii, a flowering plant
- Linckia ehrenbergii, a sea star
- Lobelia ehrenbergii, a flowering plant
- Lutjanus ehrenbergii, a perciform fish
