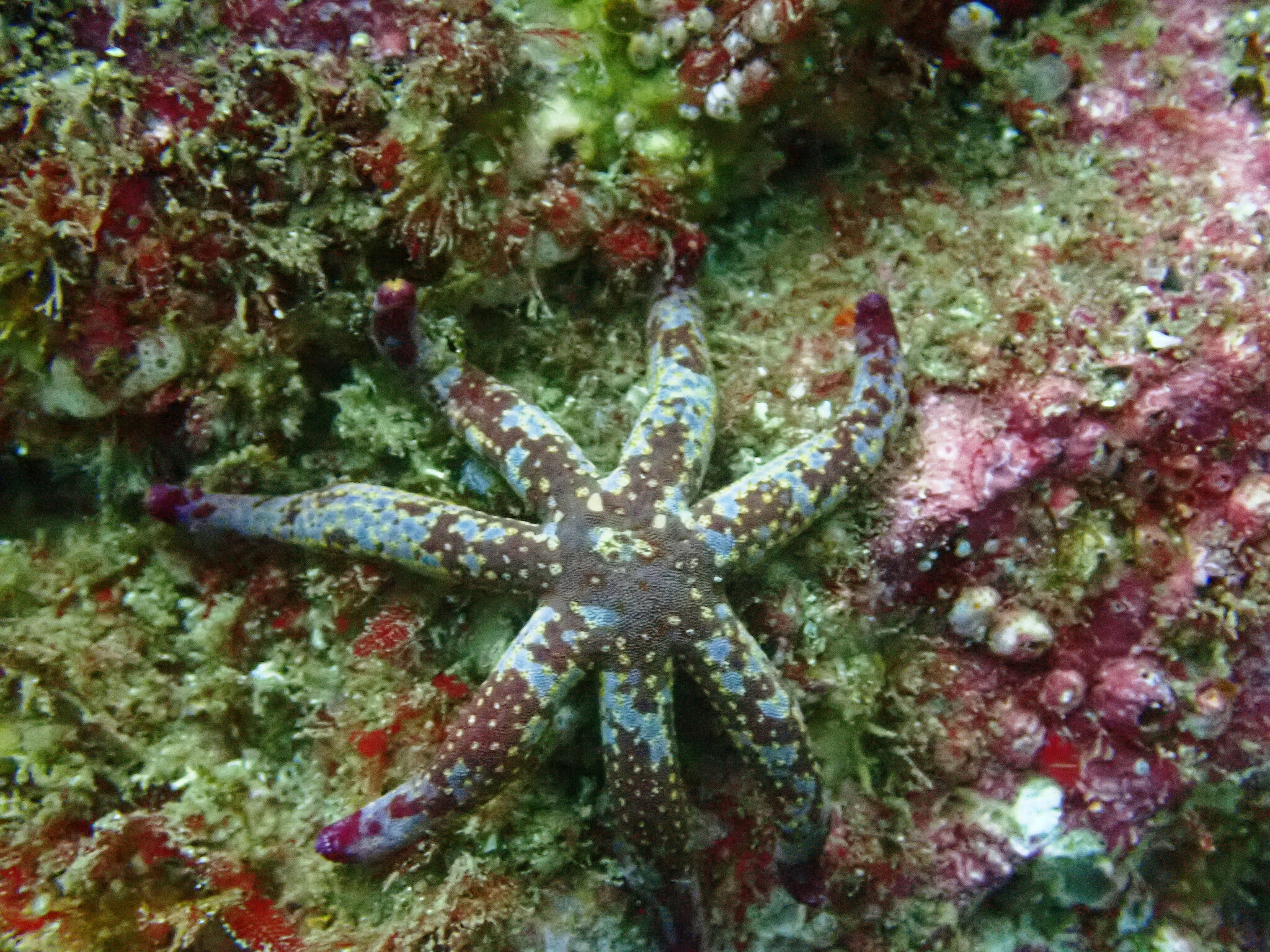
- Tamarisk Sea Star

Scientific classification
- Kingdom: Animalia
- Phylum: Echinodermata
- Class: Asteroidea
- Order: Valvatida
- Family: Ophidiasteridae
- Genus: Linckia
- Species: L. columbiae

Binomial name
- Linckia columbiae Gray, 1840

Synonyms
- Linckia diplax Perrier, 1875; Ophidiaster colombiae Müller & Troschel, 1842; Phataria fascialis Monks, 1904; Tamaria stria

= Linckia columbiae =

Species of starfish

Linckia columbiae is a species of starfish in the family Ophidiasteridae. It is found in the East Pacific where it ranges from California (USA) to northwest Peru, including offshore islands such as the Galápagos. Common names include fragile star, Pacific comet sea star and variable sea star.

== Description ==
Linckia columbiae can grow to 10 cm (4 in) across and varies greatly in colour and shape and even the number of rays. Writing in 1904, Monks stated,

"In over 400 specimens examined not more than four were symmetrical, and no two were alike ... The normal number of rays is five, but some specimens have only one, while others have four, six, seven or even nine."

The disc is small with one or two madreporites, usually oval and variable in size. The long cylindrical rays have blunt, triangular points that turn up slightly at the tip. The surface is covered in hemispherical granules which are larger near the ambulacral grooves. There are two rows of ambulacral plates which distinguishes this species from the very similar Linckia guildingi which has three rows. The colour is generally mottled grey and red and there are a number of rows of tiny yellow stars running longitudinally down each ray.

== Distribution and habitat ==
Linckia columbiae is found in the East Pacific where it ranges from San Pedro, California (USA) and the Gulf of California (Mexico) to northwest Peru. It is also found at offshore East Pacific islands such as the Galápagos, Clarion Island and Cocos Island. It is found on rocks in the intertidal zone at depths down to about 150 m (500 ft).

== Biology ==
This species often undergoes autotomy, a process where one or more rays becomes detached. The animal remains stationary while the ray, using its tube feet for purchase, pulls and twists itself away from the disc until the tissue connecting the two breaks. The separated ray is known as a "comet" and a new disc and a number of new rays start to grow on the damaged surface, a process that takes about six months to complete.
