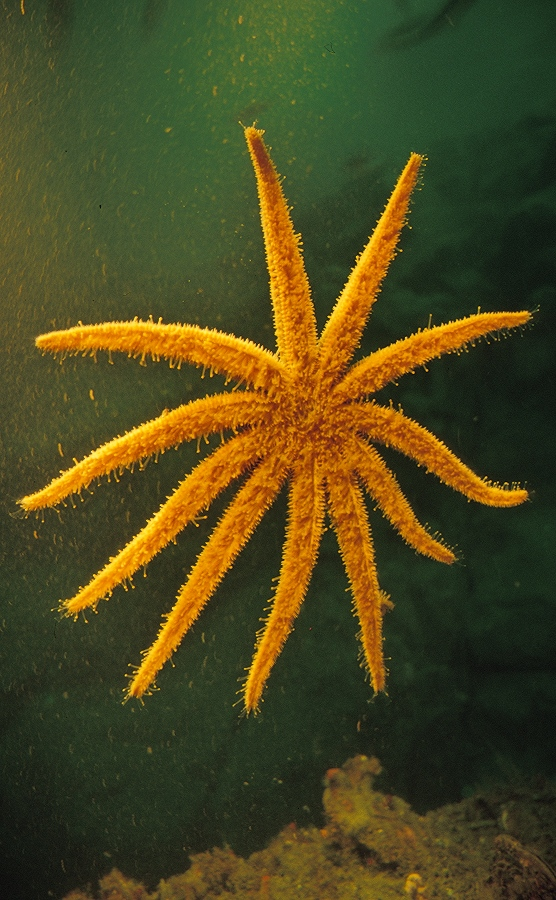

Scientific classification
- Kingdom: Animalia
- Phylum: Echinodermata
- Class: Asteroidea
- Order: Forcipulatida
- Family: Asteriidae
- Genus: Coscinasterias
- Species: C. calamaria

Binomial name
- Coscinasterias calamaria (Gray, 1840)

Synonyms
- Asteracanthion calamaria Dujardin & Hupe, 1862; Asterias calamaria Gray, 1840; Asterias jehennesii Cuvier in Perrier, 1875; Coscinasterias (Stolasterias) calamaria (Gray, 1840); Coscinasterias jehennesi (Perrier, 1869)

= Coscinasterias calamaria =

Species of starfish

Coscinasterias calamaria, or the eleven-armed sea star, is a starfish in the family Asteriidae. It was thought to be endemic to southern Australia and New Zealand but has since been documented as occurring in the Cape Peninsula as well. It is found around low tide levels and deeper, under rocks and wandering over seaweed in pools.

== Description ==
Coscinasterias calamaria is the largest starfish in southern Australia and New Zealand. Although called the eleven-armed sea star there can be any number of arms between seven and fourteen, but eleven is the most common number. These starfish are often found with arms of varying lengths. This is because arms sometimes become detached and new arms grow in their place. This starfish has rows of pincer-like pedicellariae on both its upper and lower surface which gives it a prickly appearance. Its total diameter is up to 30 centimetres (12 in).

== Distribution ==
Coscinasterias calamaria is native to the coasts of Australia and New Zealand. Its range extends from Rottnest Island in Western Australia round the southern coast to New South Wales and Point Dangar in Queensland, including Tasmania and Lord Howe Island.

== Biology ==
Coscinasterias calamaria mostly feeds on the blue mussel (Mytilus edulis) and other benthic invertebrates. It has been found that it seldom feeds on the blacklip abalone (Haliotis rubra) unless there is a scarcity of mussels. When this happens, aggregations of starfish do feed on it. This is despite laboratory feeding tests demonstrating that it prefers abalone. It seems that the abalone has some behavioural responses to attack that make it more likely to escape, one of which seems to be the production of a chemical deterrent by the mollusc. There are smell chemoreceptors on the tips of the arms, and the starfish can navigate accurately by smell towards a source of food. It then extends its stomach over its prey, secretes enzymes onto it and liquefies before returning the stomach to its normal position. When food is scarce, this starfish can exist for many weeks without food.

Coscinasterias calamaria mainly reproduces by fissiparity (self division) by tearing itself in two pieces across the disc. It is capable of regenerating a whole new body from a single arm, but only if the arm includes part of the central disc. It can also reproduce sexually. It is difficult to establish the relative importance of the two forms of reproduction in this starfish but it has been shown that individuals close to one another have little genetic diversity while starfish collected at separations of as little as 50 metres (160 ft) have widely different genetic composition, particularly so in the case of subtidal populations.
