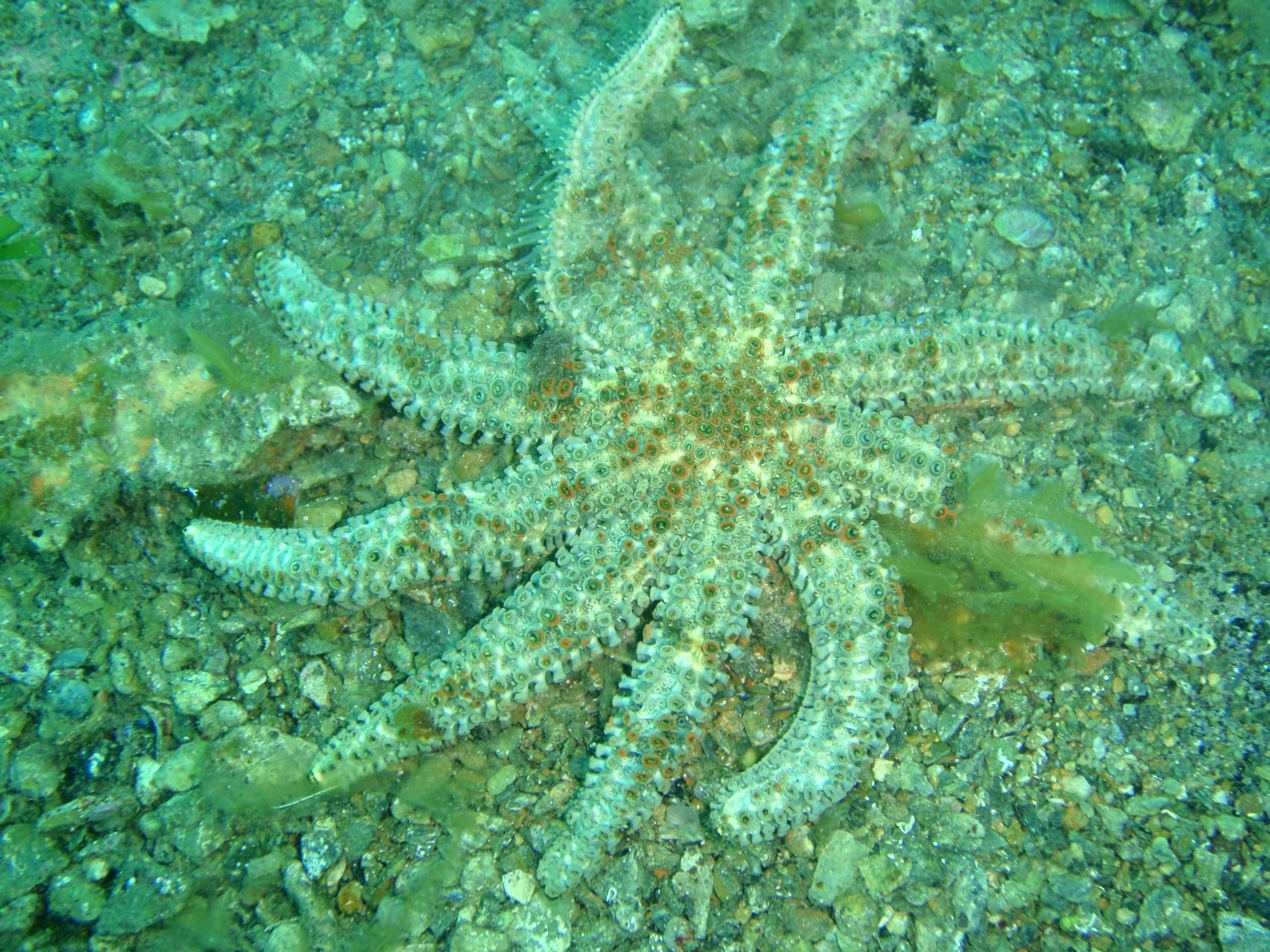

Scientific classification
- Kingdom: Animalia
- Phylum: Echinodermata
- Class: Asteroidea
- Order: Forcipulatida
- Family: Asteriidae
- Genus: Coscinasterias
- Species: C. muricata

Binomial name
- Coscinasterias muricata Verrill, 1867

= Coscinasterias muricata =

Species of starfish

Coscinasterias muricata is a species of starfish in the family Asteriidae. It is a large 11-armed starfish and occurs in shallow waters in the temperate western Indo-Pacific region.

== Description ==
C. muricata is the largest starfish in southern Australia and can reach a diameter of 50 cm (20 in). It has seven to fourteen arms, with eleven being the commonest number. The aboral (upper) surface of the arms has longitudinal rows of short spines along the surface and margins and the oral (lower) surface has two rows of tube feet. The colour is orange mottled with shades of blue, green, grey and reddish-brown. This starfish is prone to shedding its arms, making it asymmetric until new arms have grown.

== Distribution and habitat ==
C. muricata is native to temperate parts of the western Indo-Pacific region. Its range extends in Australia from Houtman Abrolhos in Western Australia to southern Australia, Tasmania and eastern Australia as far north as Port Denison in Queensland. It is also found in New Zealand, Lord Howe Island and Norfolk Island. It is common around southern Australia and New Zealand where it is found on rocks, under boulders and in sandy habitats to depths of about 150 m (500 ft).

== Ecology ==
In sheltered baylets in Australia, the tunicate Pyura stolonifera can dominate the shallow seabed to the exclusion of other sessile organisms. This provides suitable habitat for filter feeders such as sea cucumbers, brittle stars, and bivalve molluscs, and among them can be found carnivorous starfish such as C. muricata, a specialist feeder on bivalves. It is often to be found on mussel beds, as well as eating crabs and scavenging for carrion.

This starfish can reproduce by binary fission; a groove appears on the surface of the disc and the two halves of the starfish pull apart from each other. Each part will then regenerate its missing tissues. This is a form of asexual reproduction, and smaller individuals often divide in this way, while larger individuals have an extended breeding season, releasing sperm and eggs into the sea during spring and summer. The larvae are planktonic, and when sufficiently developed, settle onto the seabed in coralline algae habitats.
