= Water vascular system =

Hydraulic system in echinoderm anatomy

The water vascular system or hydrovascular system is a hydraulic system used by echinoderms, such as sea stars and sea urchins, for locomotion, food and waste transportation, and respiration. The system is composed of canals connecting numerous tube feet. Echinoderms move by alternately contracting muscles that force water into the tube feet, causing them to extend and push against the ground, then relaxing to allow the feet to retract.

The exact structure of the system varies somewhat between the five classes of echinoderm. The system is part of the coelomic cavities of echinoderms, together with the haemal coelom (or haemal system), perivisceral coelom, gonadal coelom and perihaemal coelom.

Other terms sometimes used to refer to the water vascular system are "ambulacral system" and "aquiferous system". In the past, "aquiferous system" was also used to refer to many unrelated invertebrate structures, but today, it is restricted to water channels in sponges and the hydrostatic skeleton of some mollusks like Polinices.

== Sea stars ==
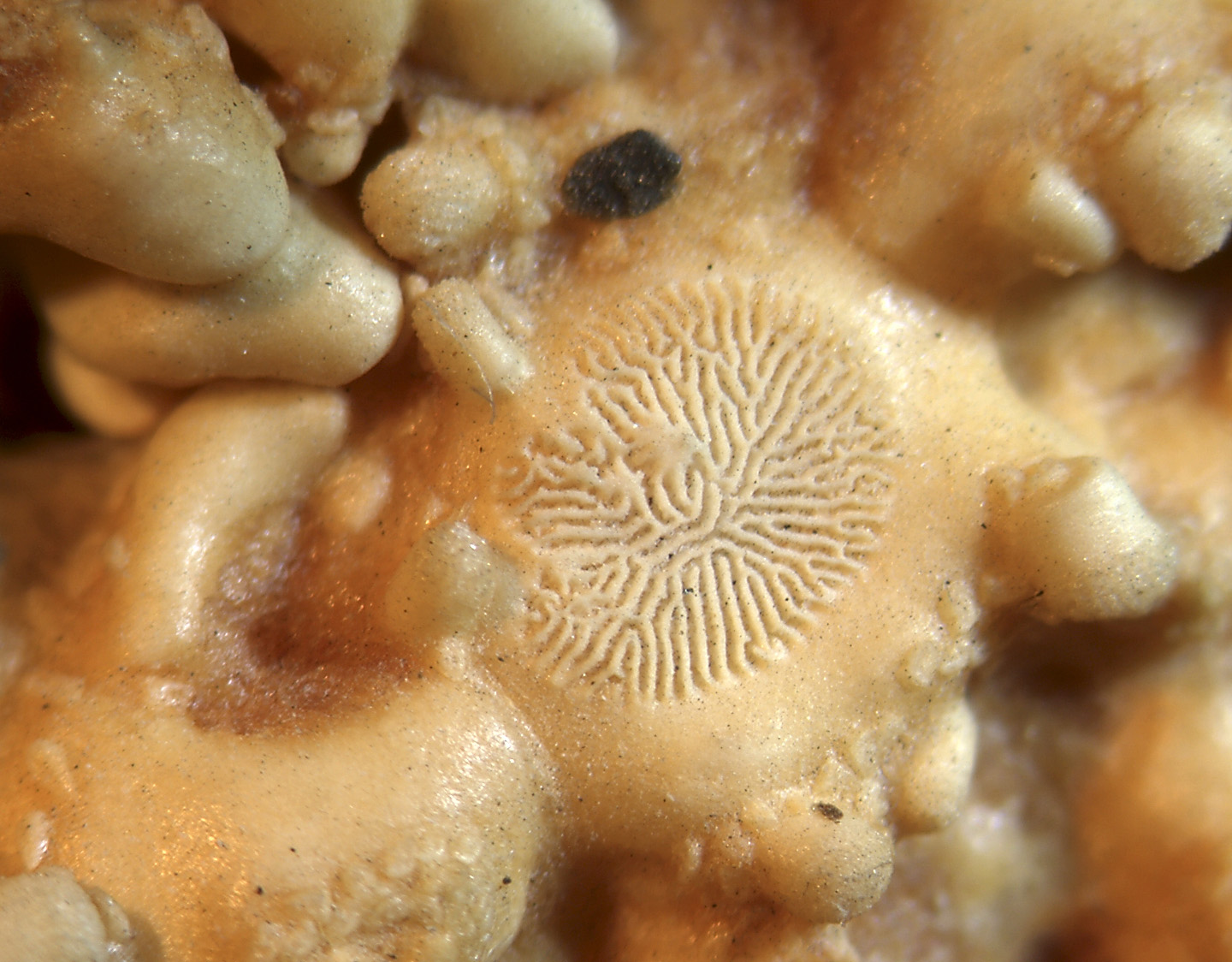
Madreporite of Asterias

In sea stars, water enters the system through a sieve-like structure on the upper surface of the animal, called the madreporite. This overlies a small sac, or ampulla, connected to a duct termed the stone canal, which is, as its name implies, commonly lined with calcareous material. The stone canal runs to a circular ring canal, from which radial canals run outwards along the ambulacral grooves. Each arm of a sea star has one such groove on its underside, while, in sea urchins, they run along the outside of the body.

Each side of the radial canals gives rise to a row of bulb-like ampullae, which are connected via lateral canals. In sea stars these are always staggered, so that an ampulla on the left follows one on the right, and so on down the length of the radial canal. The ampullae are connected to suckerlike podia. The entire structure is called a tube foot. In most cases, the small lateral canals connecting the ampullae to the radial canal are of equal length, so that the tube feet are arranged in two rows, one along each side of the groove. In some species, however, there are alternately long and short lateral canals, giving the appearance of two rows on each side of the groove, for four in total.

Contraction of the ampullae causes the podia to stretch as water is brought into them. This whole process allows for movement, and is quite powerful but extremely slow.

The central ring canal, in addition to connecting the radial canals to each other and to the stone canal, also has a number of other specialised structures on the inner surface. In between each radial canal, in many sea star species, there lies a muscular sac called a polian vesicle. The ring canal also has four or five pairs of complex pouches, called Tiedemann's bodies. These apparently produce coelomocytes, amoeboid cells somewhat similar to the blood cells of vertebrates.

Although the contents of the water vascular system are essentially sea water, apart from coelomocytes, the fluid also contains some protein and high levels of potassium salts.

== Ophiuroids ==
Ophiuroids, the group including brittle stars and basket stars, have a somewhat different water vascular system from sea stars, despite their superficially similar appearance. The madreporite is located on the underside of the animal, usually in one of the jaw plates. The stone canal runs upwards to the ring canal, typically located in a circular depression on the upper (i.e. internal) surface of the jaws. The ring canal has four polian vesicles.

Ophiuroids have no ambulacral groove, and the radial canals instead run through the solid bone-like ossicles of the arms. Unlike sea stars, the tube feet are paired instead of staggered, and there are no ampullae. Instead, a simple valve at the upper end of the foot helps to control water pressure in the tube feet, along with contraction of the associated canals.

== Sea urchins ==
The madreporite of sea urchins is located within one of the plates surrounding the anus on the upper surface of the animal. The stone canal descends from the madreporite to the ring canal, which lies around the oesophagus, and includes a number of polian vesicles. Because sea urchins have no arms, the five radial canals simply run along the inside of the solid skeletal "test", arching upwards towards the anus.

The ampullae branching off from either side of the radial canals give rise to ten rows of tube feet, which penetrate through holes in the test to the outside. As in sea stars, the ampullae are arranged alternately, but in most (though not all) cases they split into two as they pass through the test before merging again on the outer side. The tube feet of sea urchins are often highly modified for different purposes. The radial canal ends in a small water-filled tentacle which protrudes through the uppermost plate of the ambulacral region.

== Crinoids ==
Uniquely among echinoderms, crinoids have no madreporite. Instead, the oral surface is dotted with numerous minute ciliated funnels that run into the main body cavity. The ring canal has several small stone canals, located between the arms of the animal, but these open into the body cavity, and thus are only indirectly connected to the outside.

The five radial canals run into the arms and branch several times to supply all of the individual branches and pinnules lining the arms. As in other echinoderms, the radial canals give rise to lateral canals, but there are no ampullae, and clusters of three tube feet branch from the ends of each canal, except around the mouth, where they are found singly. In the absence of ampullae, water pressure is maintained by the ring canal, which is surrounded by contractile muscle fibres.

== Sea cucumbers ==
The water vascular system of sea cucumbers has no connection to the outside, and is thus filled with the internal coelomic fluid, rather than sea water. The madreporite is present, but lies within the body cavity, just below the pharynx. The stone canal is relatively short.

The ring canal normally has one to four polian vesicles, but in the order Apodida, there may be as many as fifty. The radial canals run through notches in the calcareous plates surrounding the mouth and then run along the ambulacral areas along the length of the body. Lateral canals run to both the tube feet and the large oral tentacles, all of which possess ampullae. The Apodida, which have no tube feet, also have no radial canals, with the canals to the tentacles branching off directly from the ring canal.991–992
