= Cytotype (disambiguation) =

The cytotype is a characteristic of a cell. Organisms of the same species with different cytotypes differ in:

- Karyotype
  - with different chromosome structure
  - with different chromosome number, ploidy
- Mitochondrial genome, the mitochondrial cytotype
- Chloroplast genome, the chloroplast cytotype
