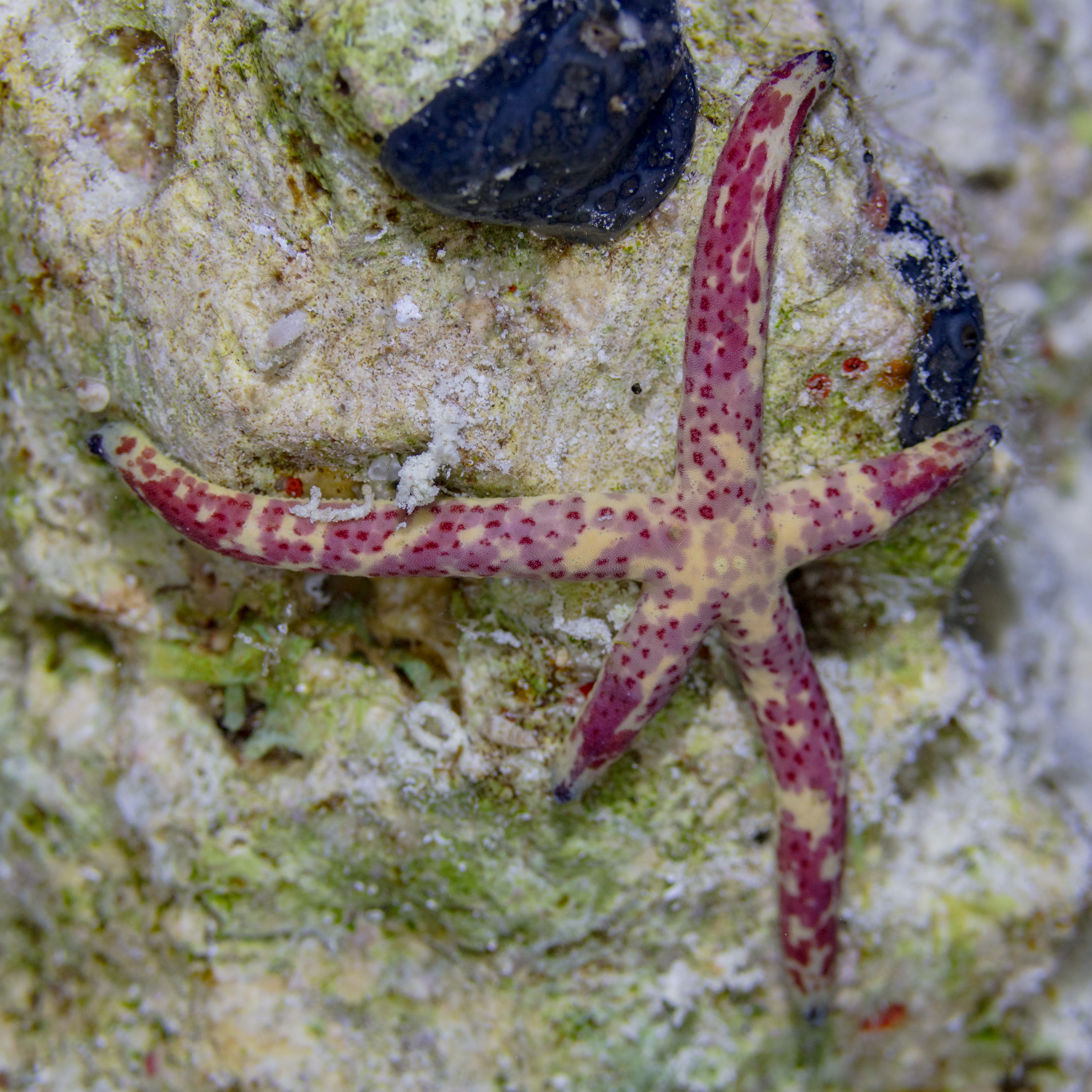
- L. multifora showing evidence of autotomy.

Scientific classification
- Kingdom: Animalia
- Phylum: Echinodermata
- Class: Asteroidea
- Order: Valvatida
- Family: Ophidiasteridae
- Genus: Linckia
- Species: L. multifora

Binomial name
- Linckia multifora (Lamarck, 1816)

Synonyms
- Linckia costae Russo, 1894; Linckia leachi Gray, 1840; Linckia typus Gray, 1840; Ophidiaster multiforis Müller & Troschel, 1842

= Linckia multifora =

Species of starfish

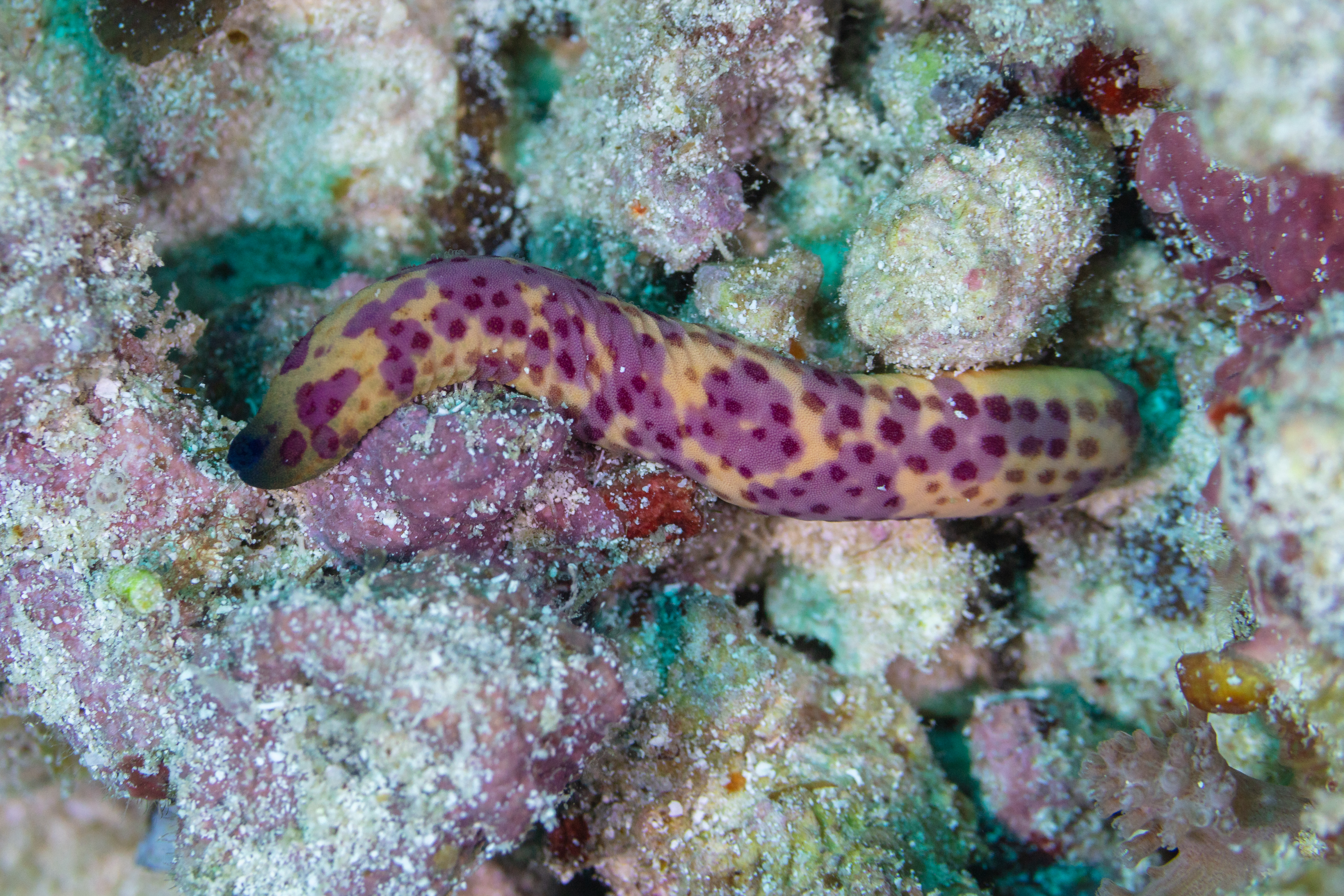
Detail view

Linckia multifora is a variously colored starfish in the family Ophidiasteridae that is found in the Pacific Ocean, Indian Ocean and Red Sea. Its common names include the Dalmatian Linckia, mottled Linckia, spotted Linckia, multicolor sea star and multi-pore sea star.

== Description ==
Linckia multifora has a small disk and five long, slim cylindrical arms that taper slightly towards the tips. The colour is variable and includes brown, pink, red, or gray with small red spots. The surface has a rough texture and is covered in granulations. This starfish can grow to a diameter of 2 to 5 inches (5 to 13 cm).

== Distribution ==
Linckia multifora is circumtropical. It is found in the Indian Ocean, Red Sea, the western Pacific north to Japan, south to Lord Howe Island, east to the Pitcairn Islands, and northeast to Hawaii. Maps at World Register of Marine Species showing the distribution limited to the western Indian Ocean and at the Encyclopedia of Life showing an observation in the Caribbean seem to be incorrect. It is found on the sea floor at depths down to about 700 feet (213 metres) and favors coral reefs.

== Biology ==
Linckia multifora exhibits autotomy (self amputation) and often sheds one or more arms. In this process, the arms become detached at various positions and each can grow into a new individual. This happens with such frequency that it is considered to be a means of asexual reproduction. Few individuals are found that do not exhibit some evidence of prior autotomy.

In a study on Hawaii, it was found that the detachment of an arm is not caused by a sudden snap. Most fractures take place about 1 inch (2.5 cm) from the disk. A small crack appears on the lower surface which spreads to adjacent parts, then the tube feet on the arm and the body pull the two parts of the animal in opposite directions. The event may take about one hour to complete. The damaged tissues take about 10 days to heal and the animal grows a new arm over the course of several months. The detached arm is known as a "comet" and moves about independently. It takes about 10 months to regenerate a new disk with arms 0.5 inch (1 cm) in length. When arms were severed into several parts in the laboratory, it was found that those over 0.5 inch (1 cm) in length were capable of regenerating including the tips of the arms and central sections with multiple injuries. Occasionally aberrant individuals developed with the wrong number of arms or with limbs in the wrong place.

Parasitic snails are sometimes found in or on the body of this starfish. The snail Stylifer linckiae in the family Eulimidae has been shown to be a parasite by its uptake of materials from the seastar.

== Use in aquaria ==
Linckia multifora is an omnivore but the diet in aquaria mostly consists of the bacterial surface films and sponges which are usually present in established tanks. This species is more tolerant of varying levels of pH, salinity and temperature than other Linckias but needs careful acclimatization at the time of introduction.
