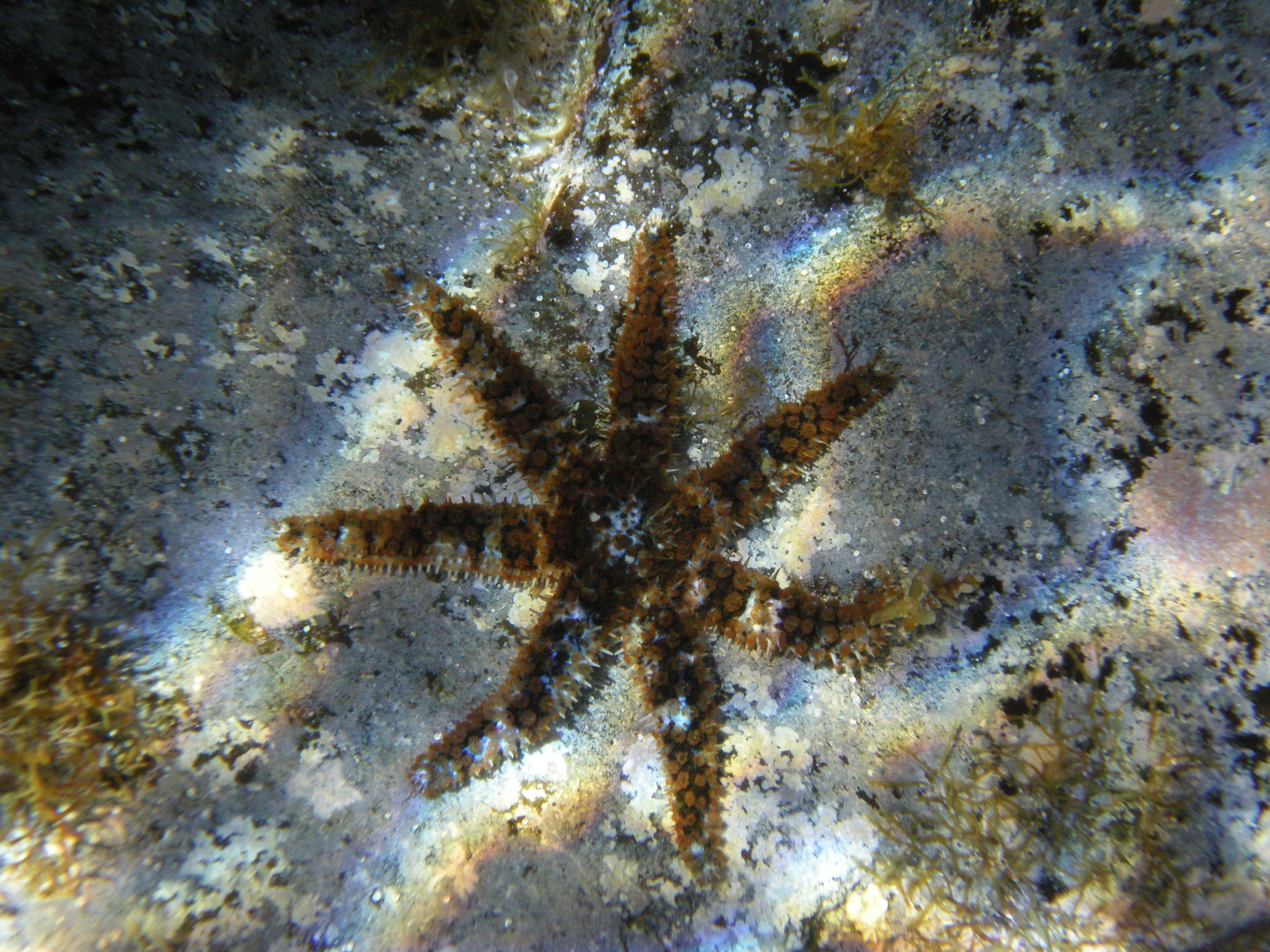

Scientific classification
- Kingdom: Animalia
- Phylum: Echinodermata
- Class: Asteroidea
- Order: Forcipulatida
- Family: Asteriidae
- Genus: Coscinasterias
- Species: C. tenuispina

Binomial name
- Coscinasterias tenuispina (Lamarck, 1816)

Synonyms
- Asteracanthion tenuispinum Müller & Troschel, 1842; Asterias atlantica Verrill, 1868; Asterias glacialis Grube, 1840; Asterias savaresi Delle Chiaje, 1825; Asterias tenuispina Lamarck, 1816; Coscinasterias (Stolasterias) tenuispina (Lamarck, 1816); Coscinasterias (Stolasterias) tenuispina (Sladen, 1889); Lytaster inaequalis Perrier, 1894; Polyasterias tenuispina Perrier, 1894; Stellonia tenuispina d'Orbigny, 1839

= Coscinasterias tenuispina =

Species of echinoderm

Coscinasterias tenuispina is a starfish in the family Asteriidae. It is sometimes called the blue spiny starfish or the white starfish. It occurs in shallow waters in the Atlantic Ocean and the Mediterranean Sea.

== Description ==
Coscinasterias tenuispina has from 6 to 12 arms (usually 7), often of varying lengths, and grows to 20 cm (8 in) in diameter. It is a creamy, slightly bluish colour, variously blotched with brown, and is rough textured with short spines.

== Distribution ==
The range of Coscinasterias tenuispina includes the Mediterranean Sea, France, Spain and Portugal, the Azores and other Atlantic Islands, Bermuda, Cuba and the American coast between North Carolina and Santos, Brazil. It is found on the lower shore and down to a depth of about 50 m (160 ft). A number of divergent populations of the starfish in the Atlantic and Mediterranean are believed to be deserving of being recognized as sub-species. The female population of the starfish in the Mediterranean is larger than that of the males.

== Biology ==
Coscinasterias tenuispina is a predator and an omnivore. The starfish is found on hard bottoms and under stones and seaweed where it mainly feeds on other echinoderms and on bivalve molluscs. In most of its range, it undergoes sexual reproduction in the winter, while in the summer, it proliferates by asexual reproduction. To begin the process of asexual reproduction, or "fission", the disc tears itself into two sections, with each part eventually growing extra arms and developing into a new individual. In Brazil, all individuals seem to be male and fission occurs throughout the year.
