= Coscinasterias =

- Coscinasterias muricata

Scientific classification
- Kingdom: Animalia
- Phylum: Echinodermata
- Class: Asteroidea
- Order: Forcipulatida
- Family: Asteriidae
- Genus: Coscinasterias; Verrill, 1867

Type species
- Coscinasterias muricata Verrill, 1867

Species
- 4, see text

Genus of starfishes

Coscinasterias is a genus of sea stars of the family Asteriidae.

== Species ==
There are four recognized species:

Image	Scientific name	Distribution
	Coscinasterias acutispina (Stimpson, 1862)	Japan
	Coscinasterias calamaria (Gray, 1840) – Eleven-arm sea star	southern Australia and New Zealand
	Coscinasterias muricata Verrill, 1867 – Splitting star	Indo-Pacific
	Coscinasterias tenuispina (Lamarck 1816) – Blue spiny starfish	Atlantic Ocean and the Mediterranean Sea

The following are synonyms of other species:

- Coscinasterias brucei (Koehler, 1908): Synonym of Diplasterias brucei (Koehler, 1907)
- Coscinasterias dubia H.L. Clark, 1909: Synonym of Sclerasterias dubia (H.L. Clark, 1909)
- Coscinasterias euplecta Fisher, 1906: Synonym of Sclerasterias euplecta (Fisher, 1906)
- Coscinasterias gemmifera (Perrier, 1869): Synonym of Coscinasterias muricata Verrill, 1867
- Coscinasterias jehennesi (Perrier, 1875): Synonym of Coscinasterias calamaria (Gray, 1840)
- Coscinasterias victoriae Koehler, 1911: Synonym of Diplasterias brucei (Koehler, 1907)
