= Stephanasterias =

Scientific classification
- Kingdom: Animalia
- Phylum: Echinodermata
- Class: Asteroidea
- Order: Forcipulatida
- Family: Asteriidae
- Genus: Stephanasterias; Verrill, 1871
- Species: S. albula

Binomial name
- Stephanasterias albula (Stimpson, 1853)

Synonyms
- Asteracanthion albulus Stimpson, 1853; Asteracanthion problema Steenstrup, 1854; Asterias albulua Stimpson, 1864; Asterias gracilis Perrier, 1881; Asterias problema Lutken, 1872; Nanaster albulus Perrier, 1894; Stephanasterias gracilis (Perrier, 1881); Stichaster albulus (Stimpson, 1853)

Genus of starfishes

Stephanasterias albula is a species of starfish in the family Asteriidae. It is the only species in its genus, Stephanasterias, which was described by Verrill in 1871. It has a circumboreal distribution and is found in the north west Atlantic Ocean, the north east Pacific Ocean, the Barents Sea and European waters. It usually has eight arms and is white with a rough upper surface. It has been trawled from depths of 267 metres.

== Biology ==
Stephanasterias albula is an omnivore, predator and scavenger.

Reproduction is by fission. A crack develops across the disc and the animal divides into two halves. New arms develop on the injured surfaces. A lack of any juvenile or young specimens found leads to the view that there is no larval recruitment and that this species is one of very few sea star species that reproduces primarily by dividing.
