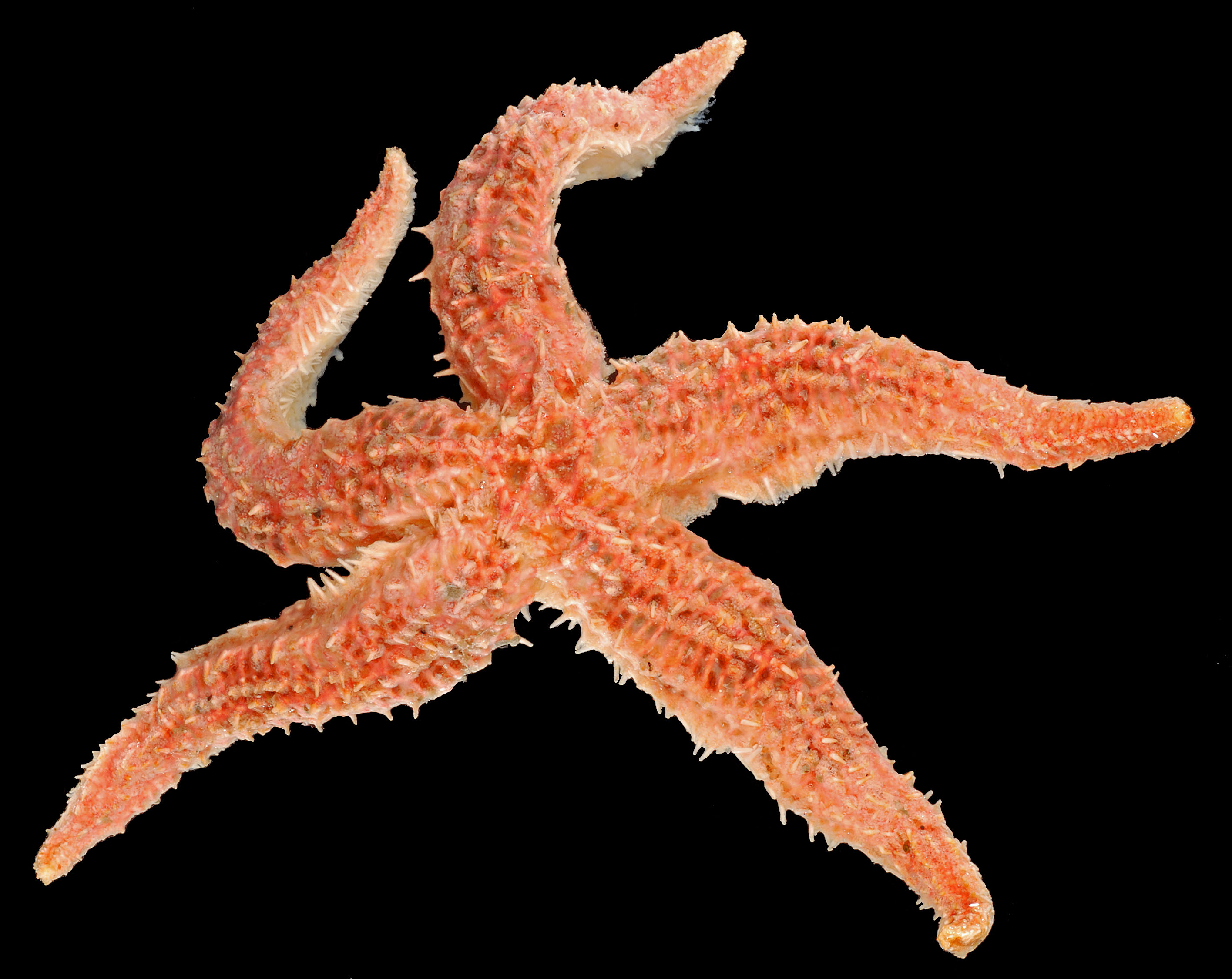

Scientific classification
- Kingdom: Animalia
- Phylum: Echinodermata
- Class: Asteroidea
- Order: Forcipulatida
- Family: Asteriidae
- Genus: Sclerasterias; Perrier, 1891

Species
- See text

Synonyms
- Australiaster; Eustolasterias; Hydrasterias; Rumbleaster; Triplasterias

= Sclerasterias =

Genus of starfishes

Sclerasterias is a genus of starfish in the family Asteriidae.

== Characteristics ==
Adult individuals have five arms but small, immature individuals have six. This led to the giving of a separate generic name to the juveniles, Hydrasterias, before it was realised that only one genus was involved. These young individuals often undergo fissiparity. The disc splits into two parts, each bearing three arms, and new arms develop on each part to complete the complement of arms. This sometimes happens repeatedly and may be an adaptation to life in cold, deep seas where most of the species are found.

== Species ==
The following species are accepted by the World Register of Marine Species:

- Sclerasterias alexandri (Ludwig, 1905)
- Sclerasterias contorta (Perrier, 1881)
- Sclerasterias dubia (H. L. Clark, 1909)
- Sclerasterias eructans (McKnight, 2006)
- Sclerasterias euplecta (Fisher, 1906)
- Sclerasterias eustyla (Sladen, 1889)
- Sclerasterias guernei Perrier, 1891
- Sclerasterias heteropaes Fisher, 1924
- Sclerasterias mazophora (Wood-Mason & Alcock, 1891)
- Sclerasterias mollis (Hutton, 1872)
- Sclerasterias neglecta (Perrier, 1891)
- Sclerasterias parvulus (Perrier, 1891)
- Sclerasterias richardi (Perrier, 1882)
- Sclerasterias satsumana Doderlein, 1902
- Sclerasterias tanneri (Verrill, 1880)

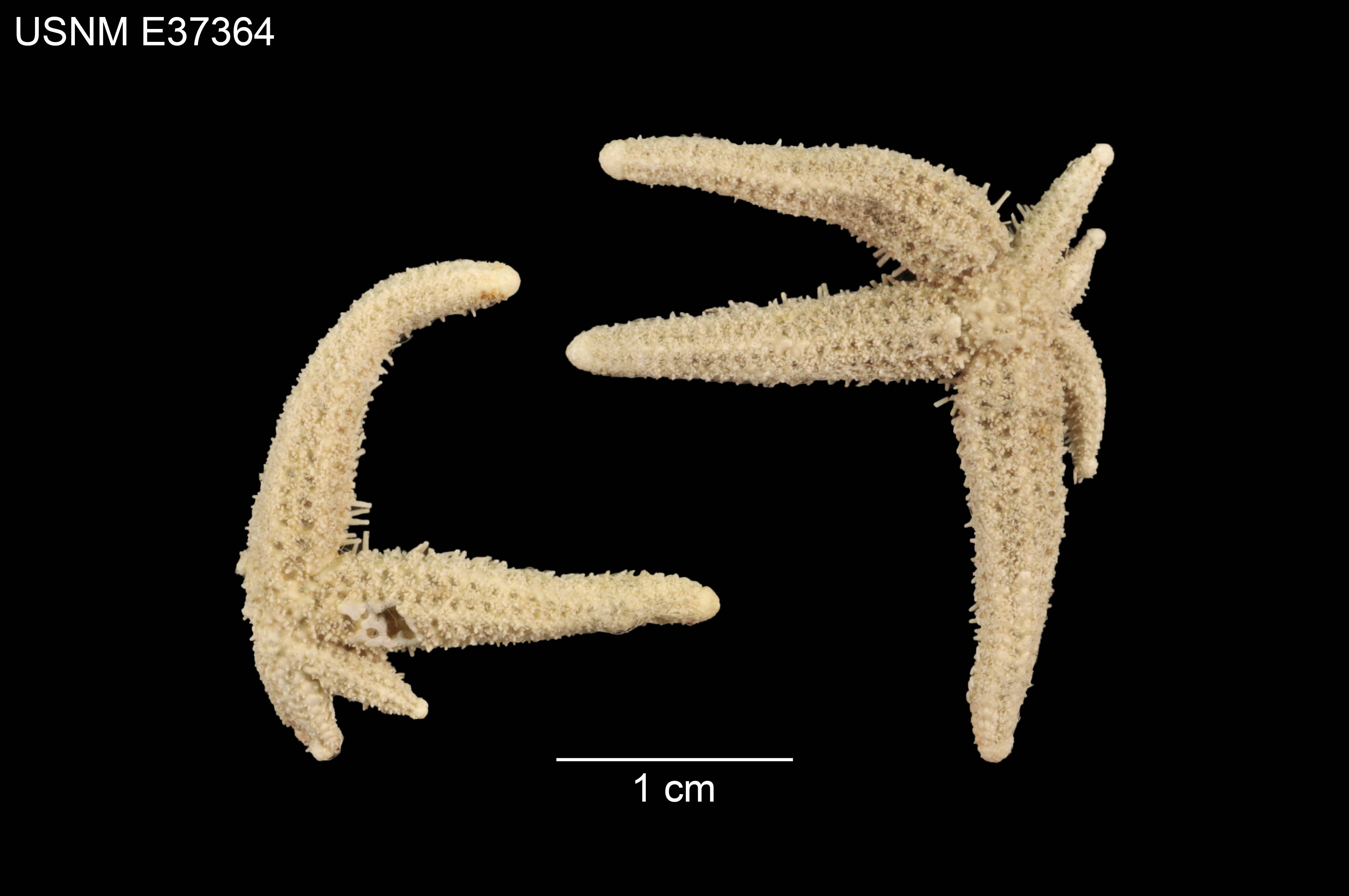
Sclerasterias alexandri

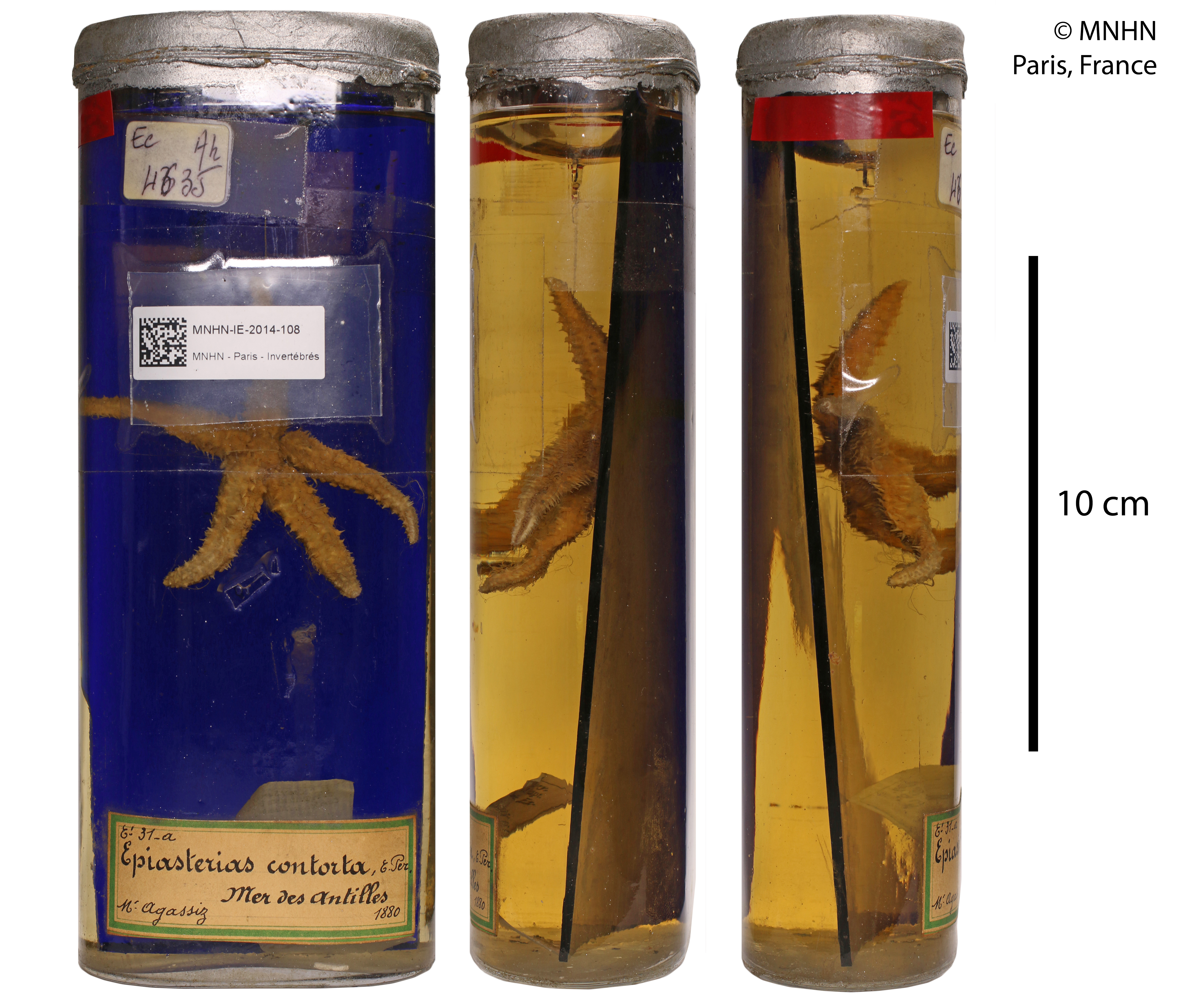
Sclerasterias contorta

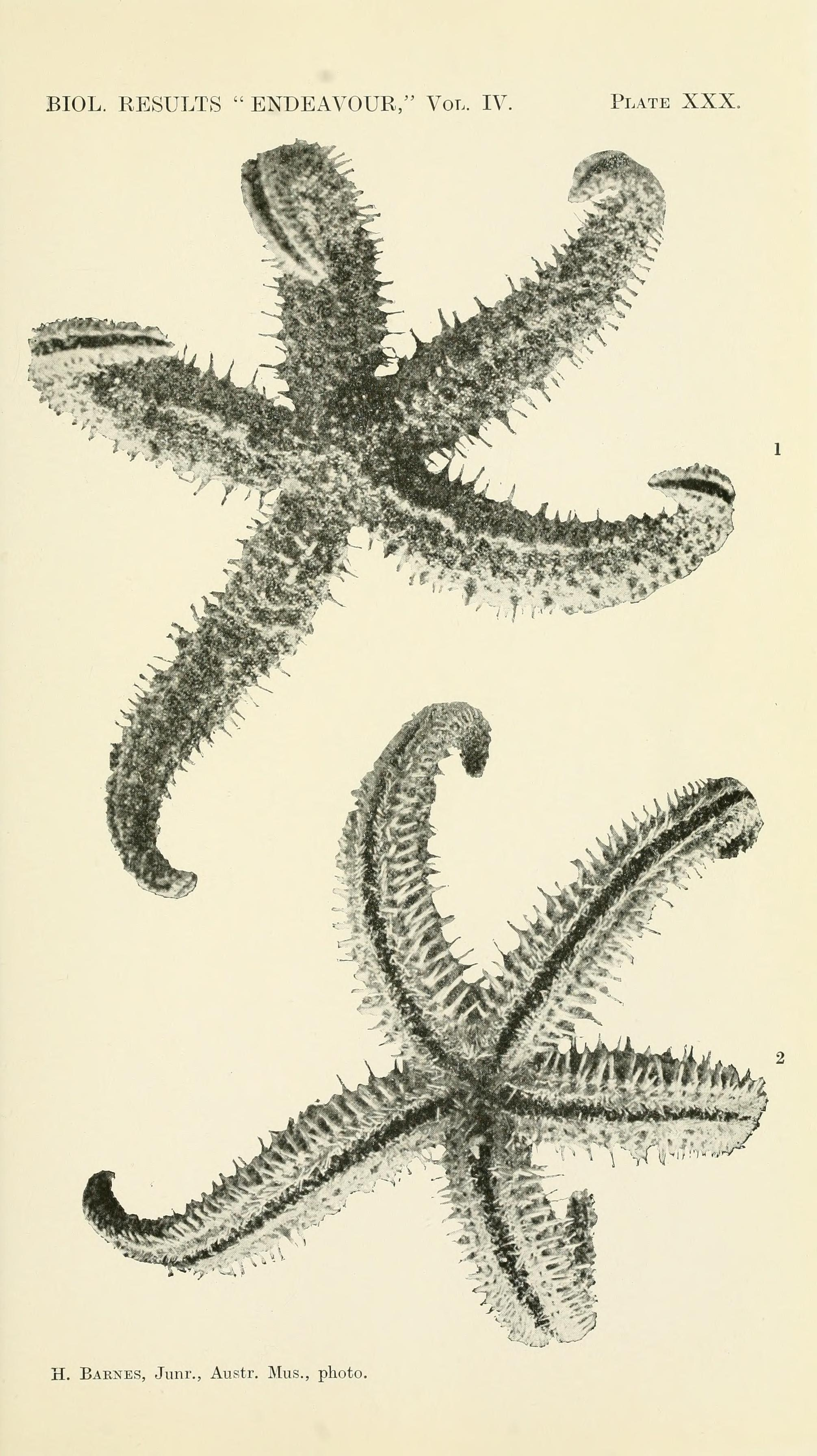
Sclerasterias dubia

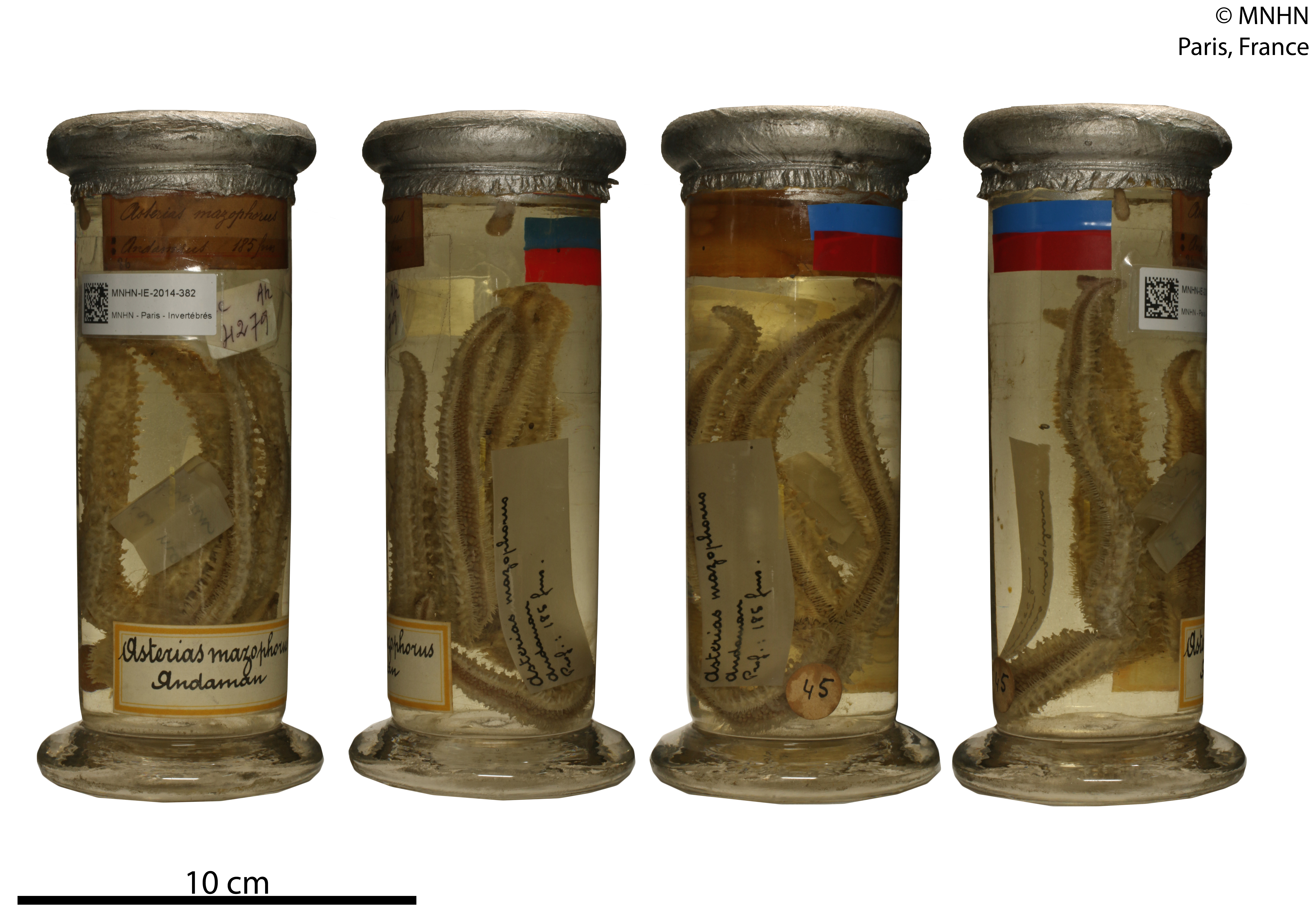
Sclerasterias mazophora

Sclerasterias mollis

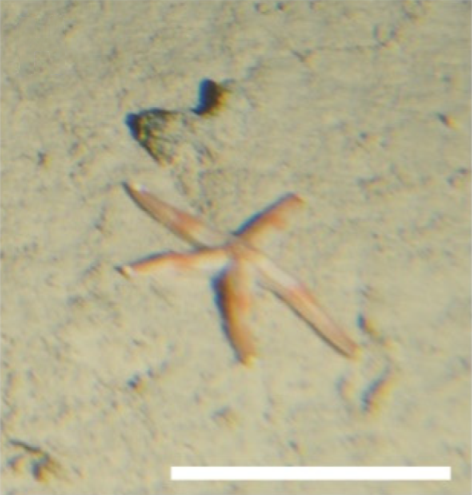
Sclerasterias neglecta

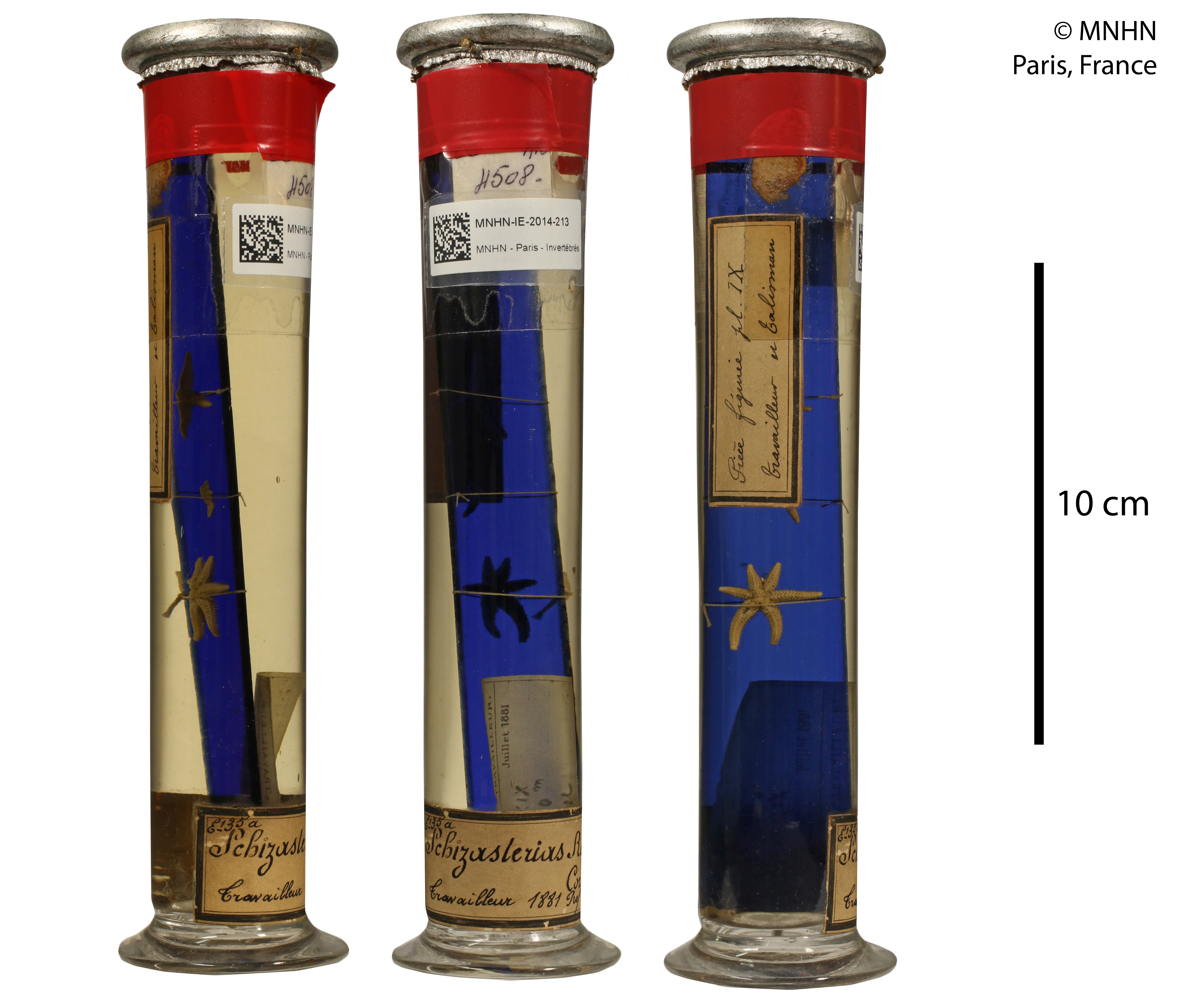
Sclerasterias richardi, collection of the National Museum of Natural History (Paris, France).
