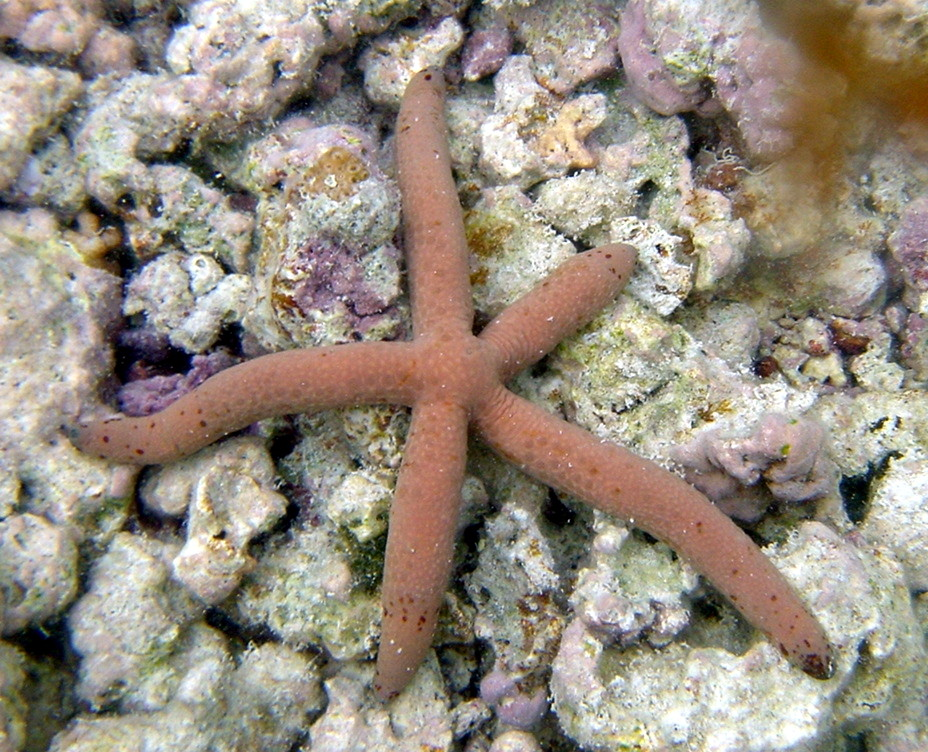
- Linckia multifora

Scientific classification
- Kingdom: Animalia
- Phylum: Echinodermata
- Class: Asteroidea
- Order: Valvatida
- Family: Ophidiasteridae
- Genus: Linckia; Nardo, 1834

Type species
- Linckia laevigata (Linnaeus, 1758)

Synonyms
- Calliophidiaster Tommasi, 1970; Cribrella L. Agassiz, 1835

= Linckia =

Genus of starfishes

Linckia is a genus of sea stars found mainly in the Indo-Pacific region. They are known to be creatures with remarkable regenerative abilities, and capable of defensive autotomy against predators. They reproduce asexually.

The genus is named after the German naturalist Johann Heinrich Linck (1674–1734).

== Systematics ==
Five groups within Linckia have been clearly genetically differentiated - L. columbiae, L. bouvieri, two clades within L. guildingi, and one clade with two subclades consisting of both L. laevigata and L. multifora . A list of species of Linckia:

- Linckia bouvieri Perrier, 1875 (=Linckia formosa)
- Linckia columbiae Gray, 1840 (=Ophidiaster colombiae, Phataria fascialis)
- Linckia gracilis Liao, 1985
- Linckia guildingi Gray, 1840 (=Linckia diplax, Linckia ehrenbergii)
- Linckia kuhli von Martens, 1866
- Linckia laevigata (Linnaeus, 1758) (=Linckia miliaris)
- Linckia multifora (Lamarck, 1816) (=Linckia costae, Linckia leachi, Linckia typus, Ophidiaster multiforis)
- Linckia nodosa Perrier, 1875 (=Calliophidiaster psicodelica, Linckia bullisi)
- Linckia tyloplax H.L. Clark, 1914

Some sources also give :

- Linckia hypnicola
- Linckia hystrix
- Linckia purpurea
- Linckia diplax
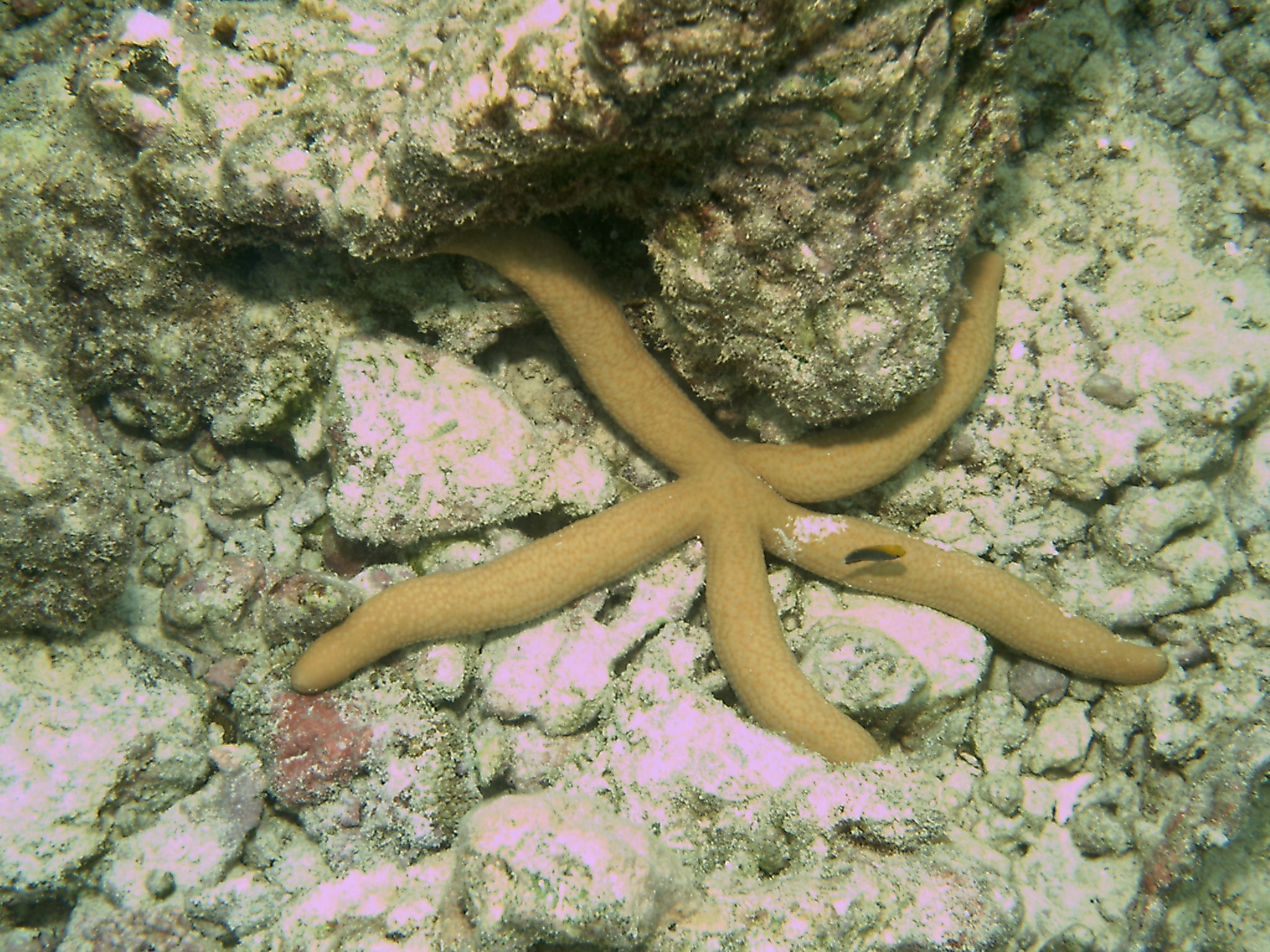
Linckia guildingi

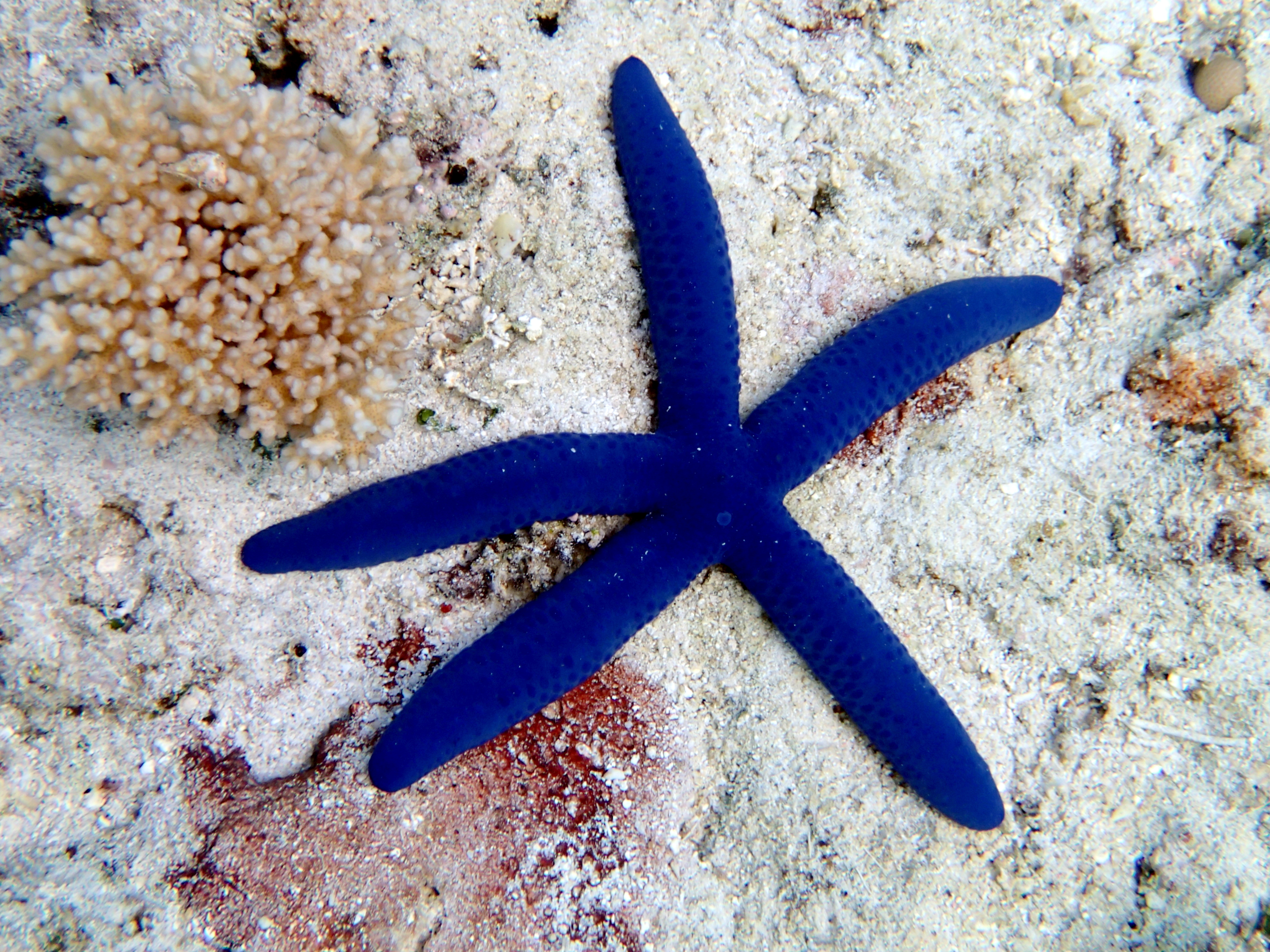
Linckia laevigata

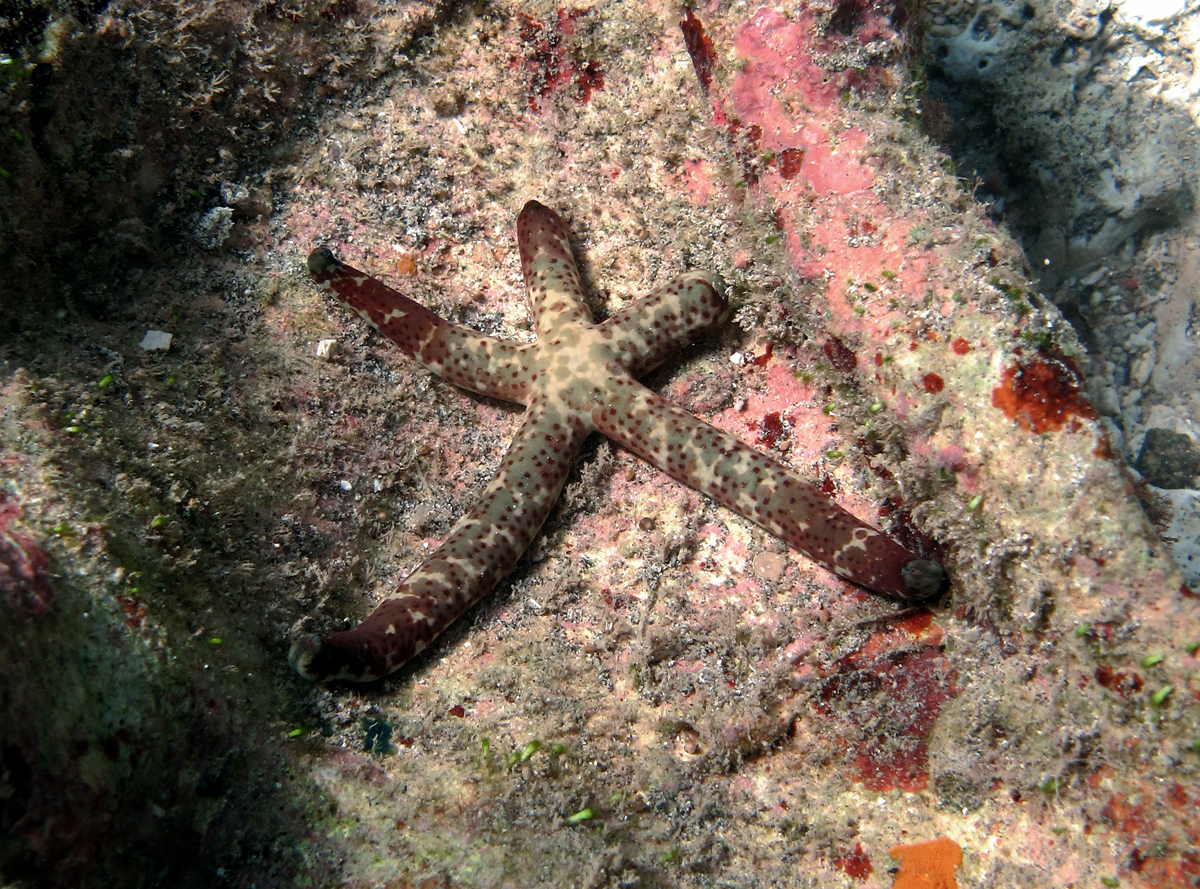
Linckia multifora

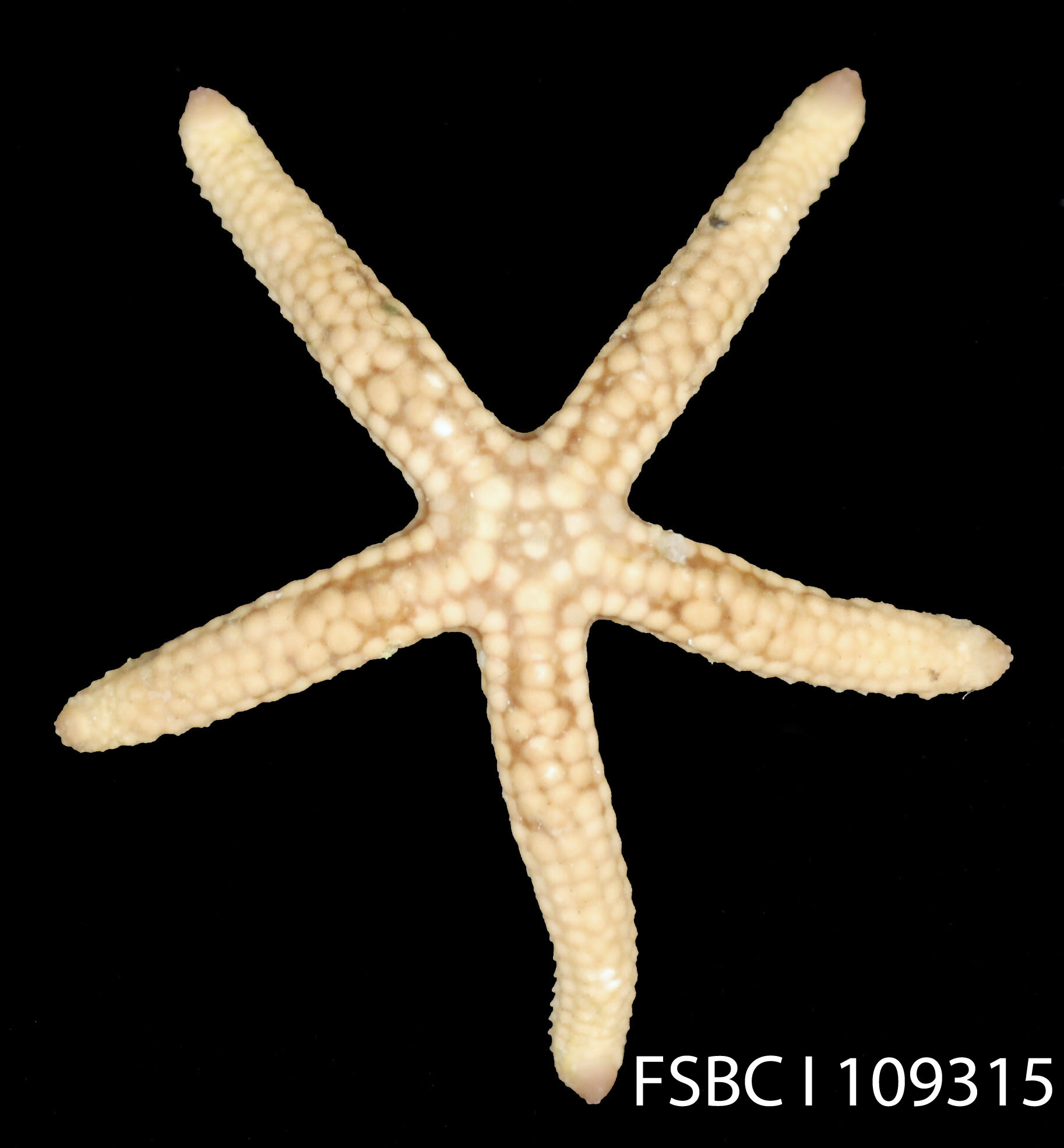
Linckia nodosa
