= Coelomocyte =

A coelomocyte (/ˈsiːləmoʊˌsaɪt/) is a phagocytic leukocyte that appears in the bodies of animals that have a coelom. In most, it attacks and digests invading organisms such as bacteria and viruses through encapsulation and phagocytosis, though in some animals (e.g., the nematode worm Caenorhabditis elegans) it does not seem capable of the phagocytosis. A coelomocyte may either be fixed to the body wall or may be free-floating within the coelom.

The word comes from the Ancient Greek koílōma, "cavity" or "hollow", and kýtos, "receptacle" or "container".
