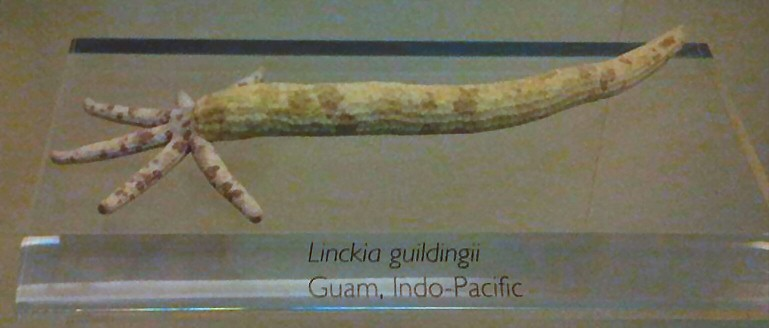
- "Comet" of Linckia guildingi

Scientific classification
- Domain: Eukaryota
- Kingdom: Animalia
- Phylum: Echinodermata
- Class: Asteroidea
- Order: Valvatida
- Family: Ophidiasteridae
- Genus: Linckia
- Species: L. guildingi

Binomial name
- Linckia guildingi Gray, 1840

Synonyms
- L. diplax (Müller & Troschel, 1842); L. ehrenbergii (Müller & Troschel); L. nicobarica Lutken, 1871; L. ornithopus (Muller & Troschel, 1842); L. pacifica Gray, 1840; Ophidiaster diplax Müller & Troschel, 1842; O. ehrenbergi Müller & Troschel, 1842; O. flaccidus Lutken, 1859; O. guildingi Müller & Troschel, 1842; O. irregularis Perrier, 1869; O. ornithopus Müller & Troschel, 1842; O. pacifica (Gray, 1840); Scytaster stella Duchassaing, 1850

= Linckia guildingi =

Species of starfish

Linckia guildingi, also called the common comet star, Guilding's sea star or the green Linckia, is a species of sea star reported from the shallow waters of the tropical Pacific Ocean, Indian Ocean, Atlantic Ocean and the Caribbean Sea.

== Taxonomy ==
Recent studies have indicated that Linckia guildingi may represent several cryptic species. Examination of the mtDNA showed that there are two clades within L. guildingi. The divergence between these implies that they separated over a million years ago.

== Distribution ==
This species was described from St Vincent's, (Saint Vincent (Antilles)) in the Caribbean Sea.

== Description ==
L. guildingi has a small disc and usually 5 (occasionally 4 or 6) long cylindrical arms. The upper surface appears smooth but is in fact rough to the touch with low, firm nodules. Though this starfish is often green, it comes in a range of colours including various shades of brown, blue and dull red.

== Biology ==
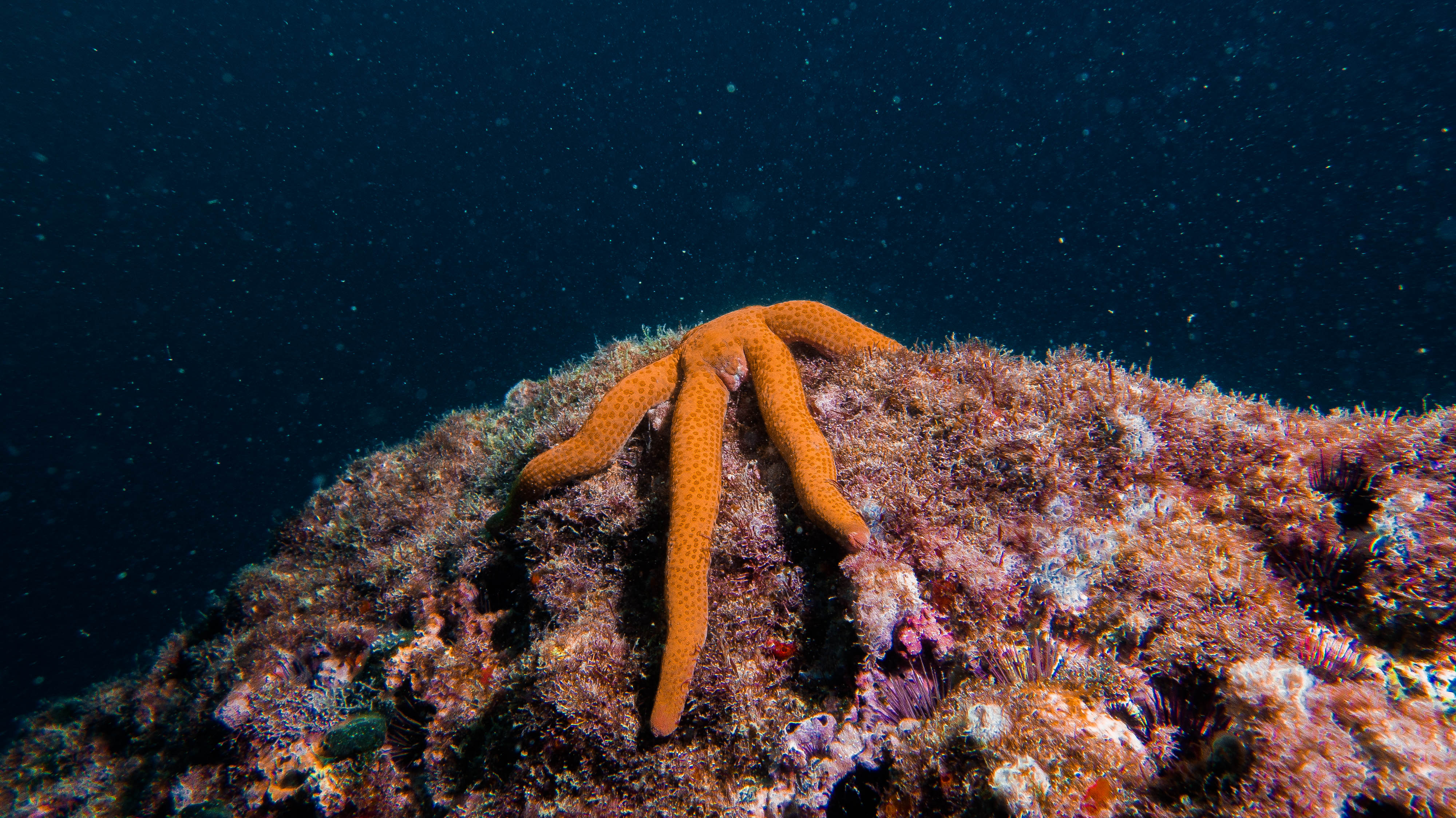
Sea star Linckia guildingi in Rio de Janeiro, Brazil

L. guildingi sometimes exhibits autotomy, shedding one or more of its arms. In a study on Hawaii, it was found that autotomy happens less frequently than in the related species, Linckia multifora, also found in these waters. In time the arm will regenerate and in both species, the detached arms, known as "comets", are capable of moving about independently and themselves developing into new individuals, a form of asexual reproduction. The process is quite slow, it taking 6 months for the madreporite to appear. At 10 months it became functional and the new arms had reached 10mm (0.4 in) long as shown in the image above.
