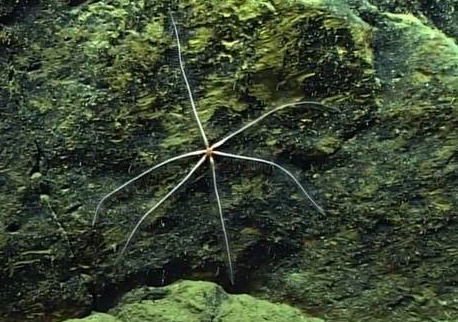
- Freyastera sp. south from Porto Rico (4500m deep)

Scientific classification
- Kingdom: Animalia
- Phylum: Echinodermata
- Class: Asteroidea
- Order: Brisingida
- Family: Freyellidae; Downey, 1986

Genera
- See text

= Freyellidae =

Family of starfishes

The Freyellidae are a family of deep-sea-dwelling starfish. It is one of two families in the order Brisingida. The majority of species in this family are found in Antarctic waters and near Australia. Other species have been found near New Zealand and the United States.

== Taxonomy ==
The starfish Brisinga endecacnemos was discovered in deep water off Norway in 1856, followed by another abyssal species, Brisinga coronata, now Hymenodiscus coronata. A new order, Brisingida, was erected to accommodate these, consisting of a single family, Brisingidae. Since then dozens of new species have been described from deep water habitats and in 1986, the American zoologist Maureen Downey split the family on morphological and behavioural grounds, creating the new family Freyellidae.

== Characteristics ==
Members of this family have a small, Ophiurida-like disc, clearly demarcated from the arms, which number more than five. The disc is approximately circular with a rim of fused plates which gives rigidity. The madreporite is near the margin of the disc. The arms are long and tapering with the ratio of the arm length to the disc radius being greater than 6/1. There is an acute angle between the arms . After a narrow cylindrical portion, the part of the arms closest to the disc accommodates the gonadal tissues and widens out somewhat. Beyond this area, the arms taper to a long point. In all these aspects members of this family resemble members of Brisingidae, the other family in the order Brisingida. They differ from Brisingidae in having the interradial arcs curved, having smaller madreporites, having bare interradial plates on the disc, having the aboral (upper) surface of the arms continuous with the disc, and having the plates on the proximal parts of the arms abutting rather than overlapping each other.

== Biology ==
Members of Freyellidae are usually found on soft substrates at depths between 950 and 5,600 m (3,100 and 18,400 ft). This is a greater depth than Brisingidae, which occurs between 100 and 4,000 m (300 and 13,100 ft), usually on hard surfaces. Because of the way their plates abut on the proximal ends of their arms, Freyellids have not been observed to raise their arms vertically above their discs, as do Brisingidae, and some are probably not suspension feeders. Some do however raise the distal portions of their arms, the parts beyond the gonadal regions.

== Genera and species ==
The World Asteroida Database lists the following genera and species:

- Family Freyellidae
  - Genus Astrocles Fisher, 1917 — three species
    - Astrocles actinodetus
    - Astrocles djakonovi
    - Astrocles japonicus
  - Genus Belgicella Ludwig, 1903 — monotypic
    - Belgicella racovitzana
  - Genus Colpaster Sladen, 1889 — two species
    - Colpaster edwardsii
    - Colpaster scutigerula
  - Genus Freyastera Downey, 1986 — six species
    - Freyastera benthophila
    - Freyastera digitata
    - Freyastera mexicana
    - Freyastera mortenseni
    - Freyastera sexradiata
    - Freyastera tuberculata
  - Genus Freyella Perrier, 1885 (synonym: Freyellidea, Fisher, 1917) — 29 species
    - Freyella attenuata Sladen, 1889
    - Freyella breviispina (H.L. Clark, 1920)
    - Freyella dimorpha Sladen, 1889
    - Freyella drygalskii (Döderlein, 1928)
    - Freyella echinata Sladen, 1889
    - Freyella elegans (Verrill, 1884)
    - Freyella felleyra McKnight, 2006
    - Freyella flabellispina Korovchinsky & Galkin, 1984
    - Freyella formosa Korovchinsky, 1976
    - Freyella fragilissima Sladen, 1889
    - Freyella giardi Koehler, 1907
    - Freyella heroina Sladen, 1889
    - Freyella hexactis Baranova, 1957
    - Freyella indica Koehler, 1909
    - Freyella insignis Ludwig, 1905
    - Freyella kurilokamchatica Korovchinsky, 1976
    - Freyella loricata Korovchinsky & Galkin, 1984
    - Freyella macropedicellaria Korovchinsky & Galkin, 1984
    - Freyella microplax (Fisher, 1917)
    - Freyella microspina Verrill, 1894
    - Freyella mutabila Korovchinsky, 1976
    - Freyella octoradiata (H.L. Clark, 1920)
    - Freyella oligobrachia (H.L. Clark, 1920)
    - Freyella pacifica Ludwig, 1905
    - Freyella pennata Sladen, 1889
    - Freyella propinqua Ludwig, 1905
    - Freyella recta Koehler, 1907
    - Freyella remex Sladen, 1889
    - Freyella vitjazi Korovchinsky & Galkin, 1984
  - Genus Freyellaster Fisher 1918 — five species
    - Freyellaster fecundus
    - Freyellaster intermedius
    - Freyellaster polycnema
    - Freyellaster scalaris
    - Freyellaster spatulifer

== Other sources ==
- Clark, A.M. and Mah, C. (2001). An index of names of recent Asteroidea, part 4. Forcipulatida and Brisingida, in: Jangoux, M.; Lawrence, J.M. (Ed.) (2001). Echinoderm Studies, 6: pp. 229–347
- Mah, C.; Hansson, H. (2013). Freyella Perrier, 1885. In: Mah, C.L. (2013) World Asteroidea database. Accessed through: Freyella Perrier, 1885 at the World Register of Marine Species on 2013-11-25
