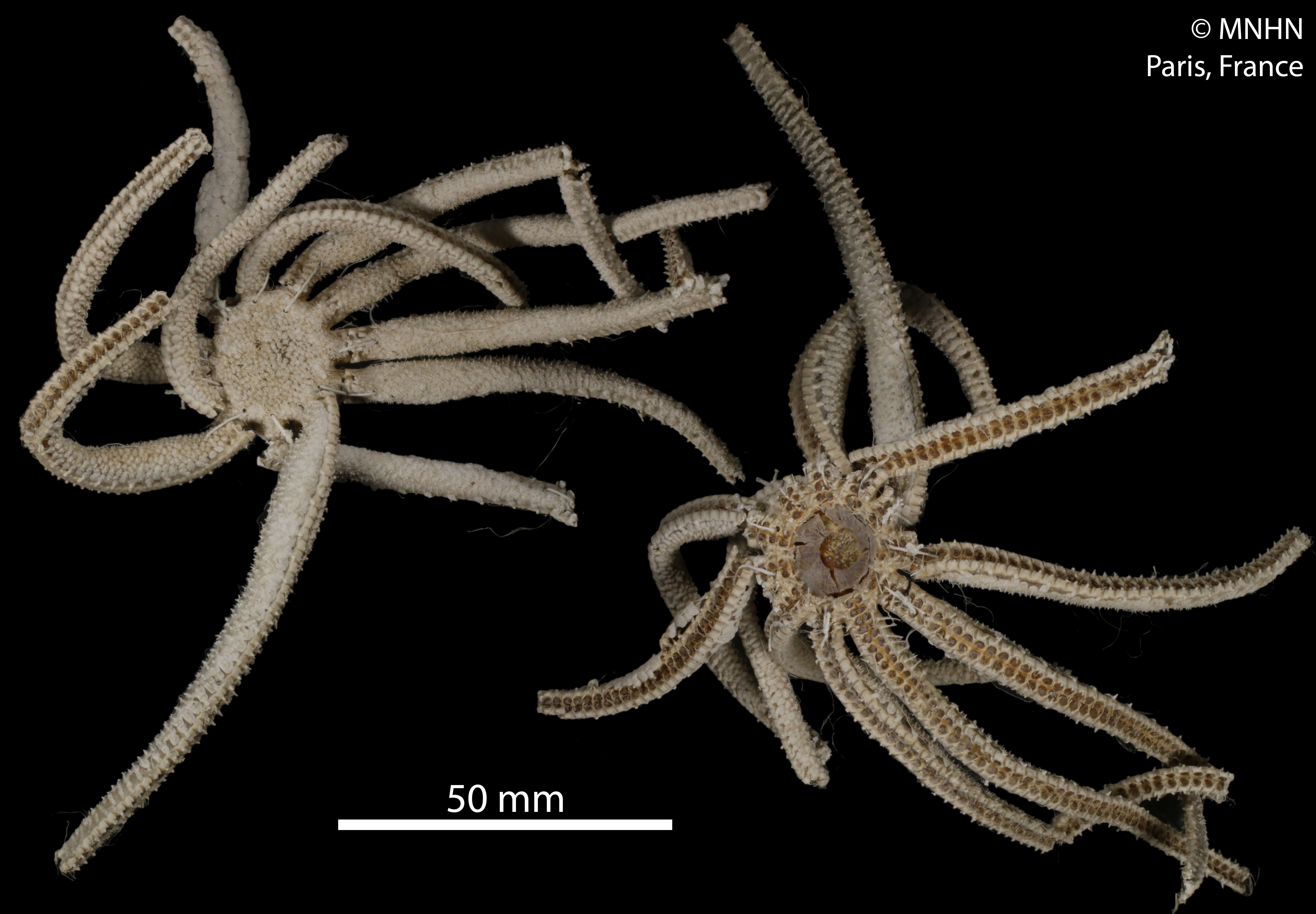

Scientific classification
- Kingdom: Animalia
- Phylum: Echinodermata
- Class: Asteroidea
- Order: Brisingida
- Family: Freyellidae
- Genus: Freyella
- Species: F. elegans

Binomial name
- Freyella elegans (Verrill, 1884)

Synonyms
- Brisinga elegans Verrill, 1884; Freyella aspera Verrill, 1895; Freyella bracteata Sladen, 1889; Freyella laubieri Cherbonnier & Sibuet, 1972; Freyella spinosa Perrier, 1885

= Freyella elegans =

Species of starfish

Freyella elegans is a species of deep-water starfish in the family Freyellidae in the order Brisingida, living at abyssal depths in the northwestern Atlantic Ocean.

== Taxonomy ==
All Freyella species occur in very deep water, and are gathered only occasionally from isolated locations, almost exclusively by dredging or using a beam trawl. Targeted collection is virtually impossible and the material that is brought up is almost never intact. That makes the description and naming of species complicated. In 1986, Maureen Downey published the results of a study she had done on the deep sea starfish from the Atlantic that had been described at that time. One of her findings was that the species described by Verrill in 1884 and named by him as Brisinga elegans, had later been redefined by several authors under different names, and she reduced these names to synonyms of Freyella elegans.

== Description ==
This starfish has a small disc and normally twelve long, rather rigid arms, about 210 mm (8 in) long. The hexagonal plates on the aboral (upper surface) of the disc bear one to three spinelets and are covered by a membrane with no pedicellariae. The madreporite is near the margin of the disc and the anus is quite distinct and near the centre of the disc. The spines on the lateral plates are short and robust. The arms are long, narrow and cylindrical at the proximal end near the disc, widening slightly and becoming cigar-shaped distally and tapering near the tips. Here, the membrane covering them is semi-transparent, and there are saddle-like bands, and many small pedicellariae. Underneath the arms, the ambulacral groove occupies more than half the width of each arm. The outer spines around the mouth on the oral (lower surface) of the disc form a bar across the ambulacral grooves.

== Distribution ==
This starfish is a bathydemersal species living in the northwestern Atlantic Ocean, at depths of around 3,000 m (10,000 ft). It has been detected between Cape Hatteras and the Georges Bank, as well as near Greenland and in the Gulf of Guinea.

== Ecology ==
Little is known of the feeding habits of this species. Although some members of the Brisingida have been photographed with their arms raised, apparently filter feeding, those in the genus Freyella have only been observed lying flat on the sediment and are therefore probably not suspension feeders; some have been found to have the exoskeletons of small crustaceans within their buccal cavities.
