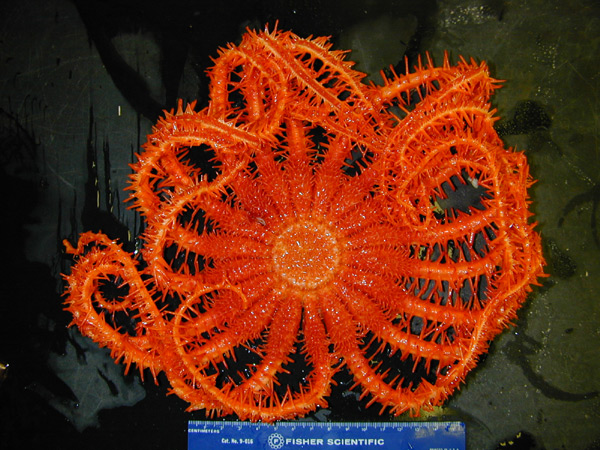
- Novodinia sp.

Scientific classification
- Kingdom: Animalia
- Phylum: Echinodermata
- Class: Asteroidea
- Order: Brisingida
- Family: Brisingidae; G.O. Sars, 1875

Genera
- See text

= Brisingidae =

Family of starfishes

The Brisingidae are a family of starfish found only in the deep sea. They inhabit both the Atlantic and Pacific Oceans at abyssal depths, and also occur in the Southern Ocean and around Antarctica at slightly shallower depths.

The family was named after Brísingamen, a necklace belonging to Freya from Norse mythology that was stolen by Loki and hidden in the sea.

== Characteristics ==
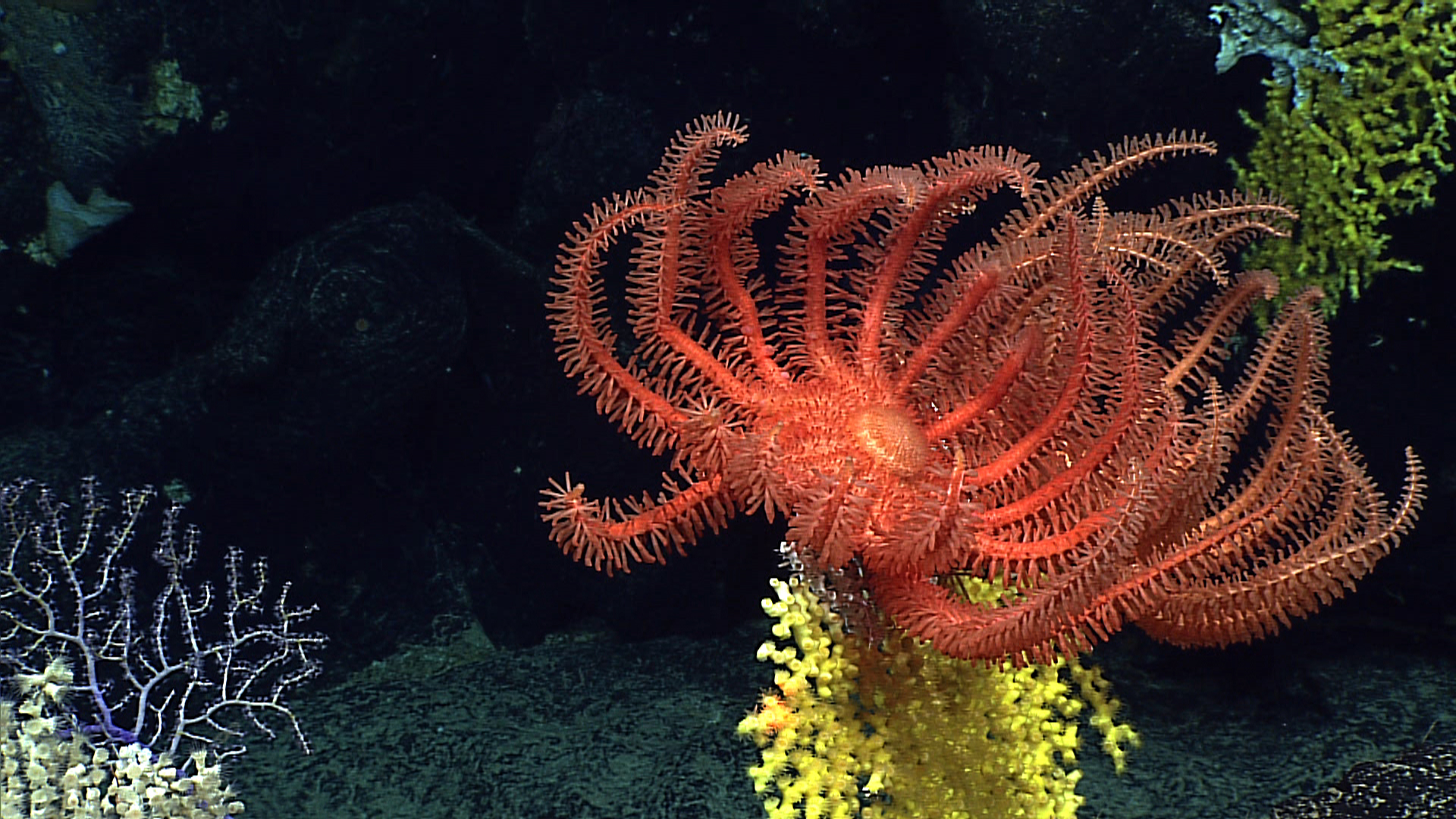
Novodinia pacifica

Members of this family have a small, Ophiurida-like disc, clearly demarcated from the arms, which number more than five. The disc is approximately circular with a rim of fused plates which gives rigidity. The madreporite is near the margin of the disc. The arms are long and tapering with the ratio of the arm length to the disc radius being greater than 6/1. There is an acute angle between them and they can be shed at the base where they are separated from the disc by a deep groove. After a narrow cylindrical portion, the part of the arms closest to the disc accommodates the gonadal tissues and widens out somewhat. Beyond this area, the arms taper to a long point. The plates on the aboral (upper) side of the arms are small, and are much smaller than the marginal plates, which are armed with spines. The ambulacral groove on the underside of each arm is broad and there is a row of tube feet with suckers on either side of the groove. The pedicellariae are crossed.

== Biology ==
Members of this family live on hard surfaces at depths between 100 and 4,500 m (300 and 14,800 ft). They raise their arms vertically above their discs to filter feed on suspended organic particles drifting past. They are able to raise their arms in this way because of the small size of its plates on the aboral surfaces of their arms which gives them flexibility in a vertical plane. Novodinia is less adept at raising its arms, because of a different arrangement of the plates; in contrast, members of the other brisingid family, Freyellidae, have not been detected raising their arms in this way.

== Genera and species ==
Brisingidae contains the following genera and species:

- Astrolirus Fisher, 1917
  - Astrolirus panamensis (Ludwig, 1905)
  - Astrolirus patricki Zhang, Zhou, Xiao & Wang, 2020
- Astrostephane Fisher, 1917
  - Astrostephane acanthogenys (Fisher, 1916)
  - Astrostephane moluccana (Fisher, 1916)
- Brisinga Asbjørnsen, 1856
  - Brisinga alberti Fisher, 1907
  - Brisinga analoga (Fisher, 1919)
  - Brisinga andamanica Wood-Mason & Alcock, 1891
  - Brisinga bengalensis Wood-Mason & Alcock, 1891
  - Brisinga chathamica McKnight, 1973
  - Brisinga costata Verrill, 1884
  - Brisinga cricophora Sladen, 1889
  - Brisinga distincta Sladen, 1889
  - Brisinga endecacnemos Asbjørnsen, 1856
  - Brisinga eucoryne Fisher, 1916
  - Brisinga evermanni Fisher, 1906
  - Brisinga gunnii Alcock, 1893
  - Brisinga hirsuta Perrier, 1894
  - Brisinga insularum Wood-Mason & Alcock, 1891
  - Brisinga panopla Fisher, 1906
  - Brisinga parallela Koehler, 1909
  - Brisinga synaptoma (Fisher, 1917)
  - Brisinga tasmani H.E.S. Clark, 1970
  - Brisinga trachydisca Fisher, 1916
  - Brisinga variispina Ludwig, 1905
- Brisingaster Loriol, 1883
  - Brisingaster robillardi de Loriol, 1883
- Brisingella Fisher, 1917
  - Brisingella verticillata (Sladen, 1889)
- Brisingenes Fisher, 1917
  - Brisingenes anchista Fisher, 1919
  - Brisingenes margoae Mah, 2016
  - Brisingenes mimica (Fisher, 1916)
  - Brisingenes multicostata (Verrill, 1894)
  - Brisingenes plurispinula Aziz & Jangoux, 1985
- Hymenodiscus Perrier, 1884
  - Hymenodiscus agassizi (Perrier, 1882)
  - Hymenodiscus aotearoa (McKnight, 1973)
  - Hymenodiscus armillata (Sladen, 1889)
  - Hymenodiscus beringiana (Korovchinsky, 1967)
  - Hymenodiscus coronata (Sars G.O., 1872)
  - Hymenodiscus distincta (Sladen, 1889)
  - Hymenodiscus exilis (Fisher, 1905)
  - Hymenodiscus fragilis (Fisher, 1906)
  - Hymenodiscus membranacea (Sladen, 1889)
  - Hymenodiscus monacantha H.L. Clark, 1920
  - Hymenodiscus ochotensis Djakonov 1950
  - Hymenodiscus pannychia Fisher, 1928
  - Hymenodiscus pusilla Fisher, 1917
  - Hymenodiscus submembranacea (Doderlein, 1927)
  - Hymenodiscus tenella (Luwig, 1905)
  - Hymenodiscus verticellata (Sladen, 1889)
- Labidiaster Lütken, 1872
- Midgardia Downey, 1972
  - Midgardia xandaros Downey, 1972
- Novodinia Dartnall, Pawson, Pope & B.J. Smith, 1969
  - Novodinia americana (Verrill, 1880)
  - Novodinia antillensis (A.H. Clark, 1934)
  - Novodinia austini (Koehler, 1909)
  - Novodinia australis (H.L. Clark, 1916)
  - Novodinia clarki (Koehler, 1909)
  - Novodinia homonyma Downey, 1986
  - Novodinia magister Fisher, 1917
  - Novodinia novaezelandiae (H.E.S. Clark, 1962)
  - Novodinia pacifica (Fisher, 1906)
  - Novodinia pandina (Sladen, 1889)
  - Novodinia penichra (Fisher, 1916)
  - Novodinia radiata Aziz & Jangoux, 1985
  - Novodinia semicoronata (Perrier, 1885)
- Odinella Fisher, 1940
  - Odinella nutrix Fisher, 1940
- Stegnobrisinga Fisher, 1916
  - Stegnobrisinga gracilis (Koehler, 1909)
  - Stegnobrisinga placoderma Fisher, 1916
  - Stegnobrisinga splendens H.L. Clark, 1926
