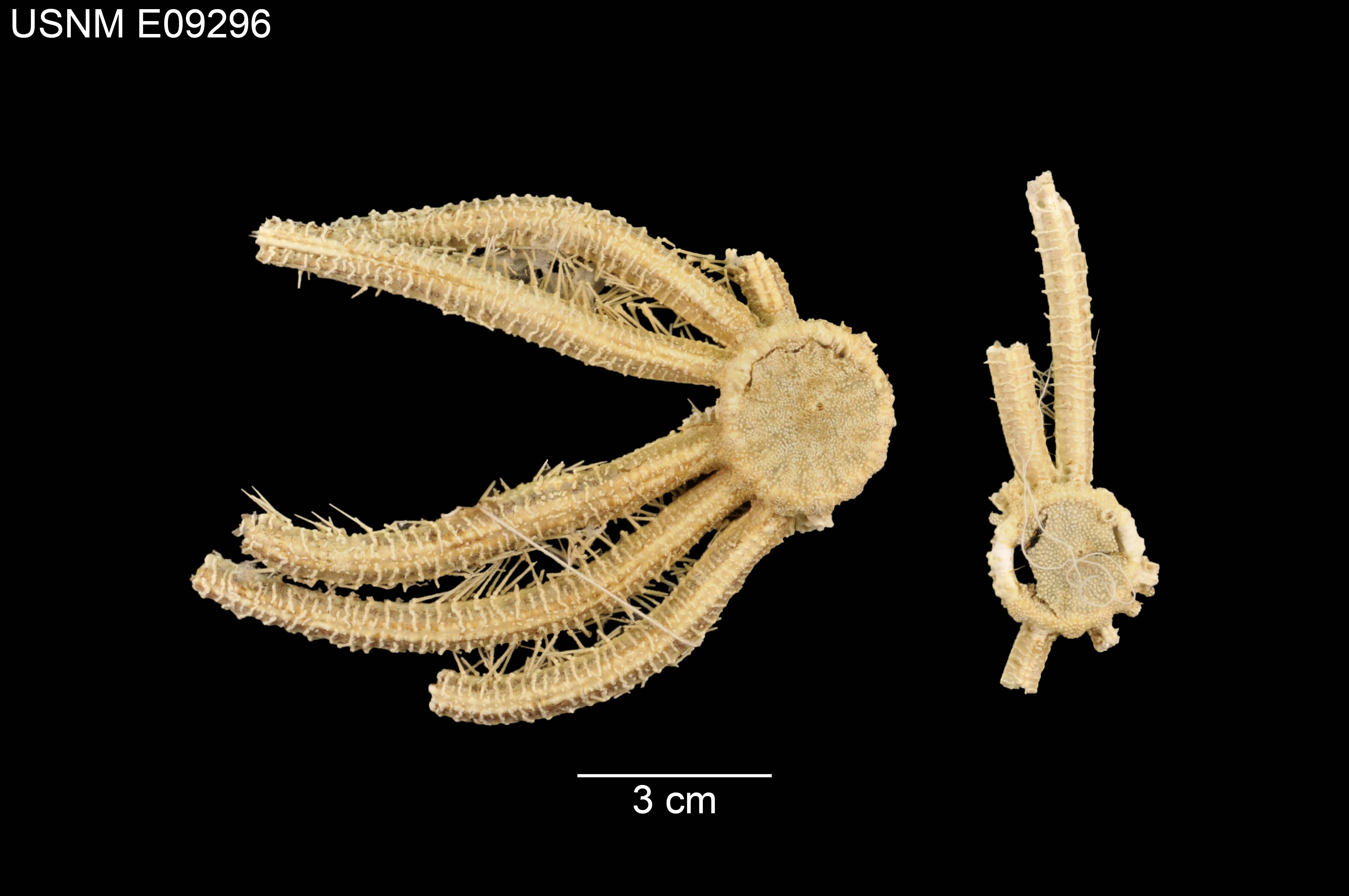

Scientific classification
- Kingdom: Animalia
- Phylum: Echinodermata
- Class: Asteroidea
- Order: Brisingida
- Family: Brisingidae
- Genus: Brisinga
- Species: B. synaptoma

Binomial name
- Brisinga synaptoma (Fisher, 1917)

= Brisinga synaptoma =

Species of starfish in the family Brisingidae

Brisinga synaptoma is a species of starfish in the family Brisingidae. It has 12 to 15 arms and a very long genital area crossed by 35 to 40 irregular costae. The scientific name of the species, as Craterobrisinga synaptoma, was published in 1917 by Walter Kenrick Fisher. The description was based on one specimen dredged up from 1,588 fathoms (2,904 meters) at Sampling Station 3342 of the Albatross research vessel, off the coast of British Columbia.

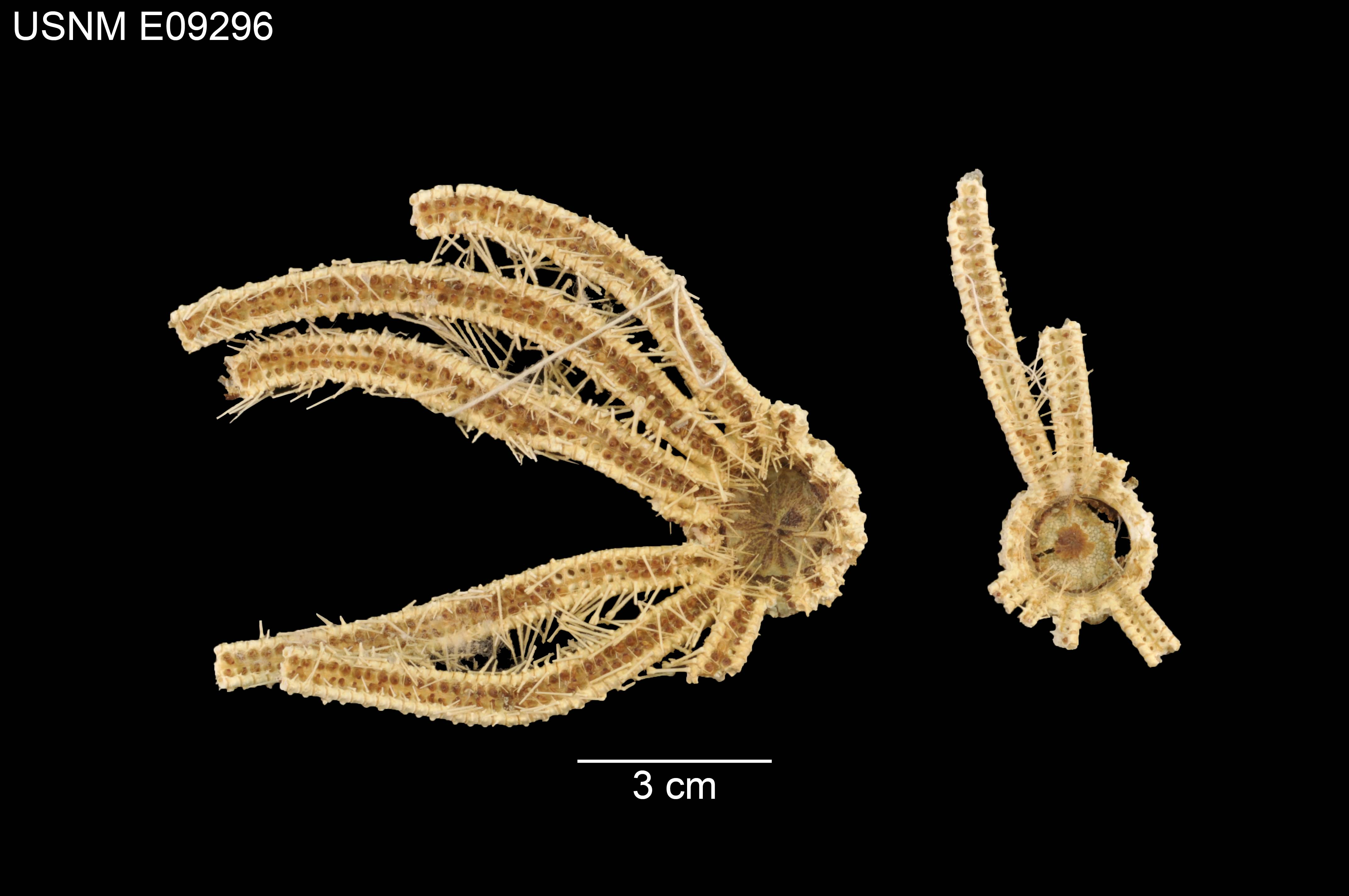

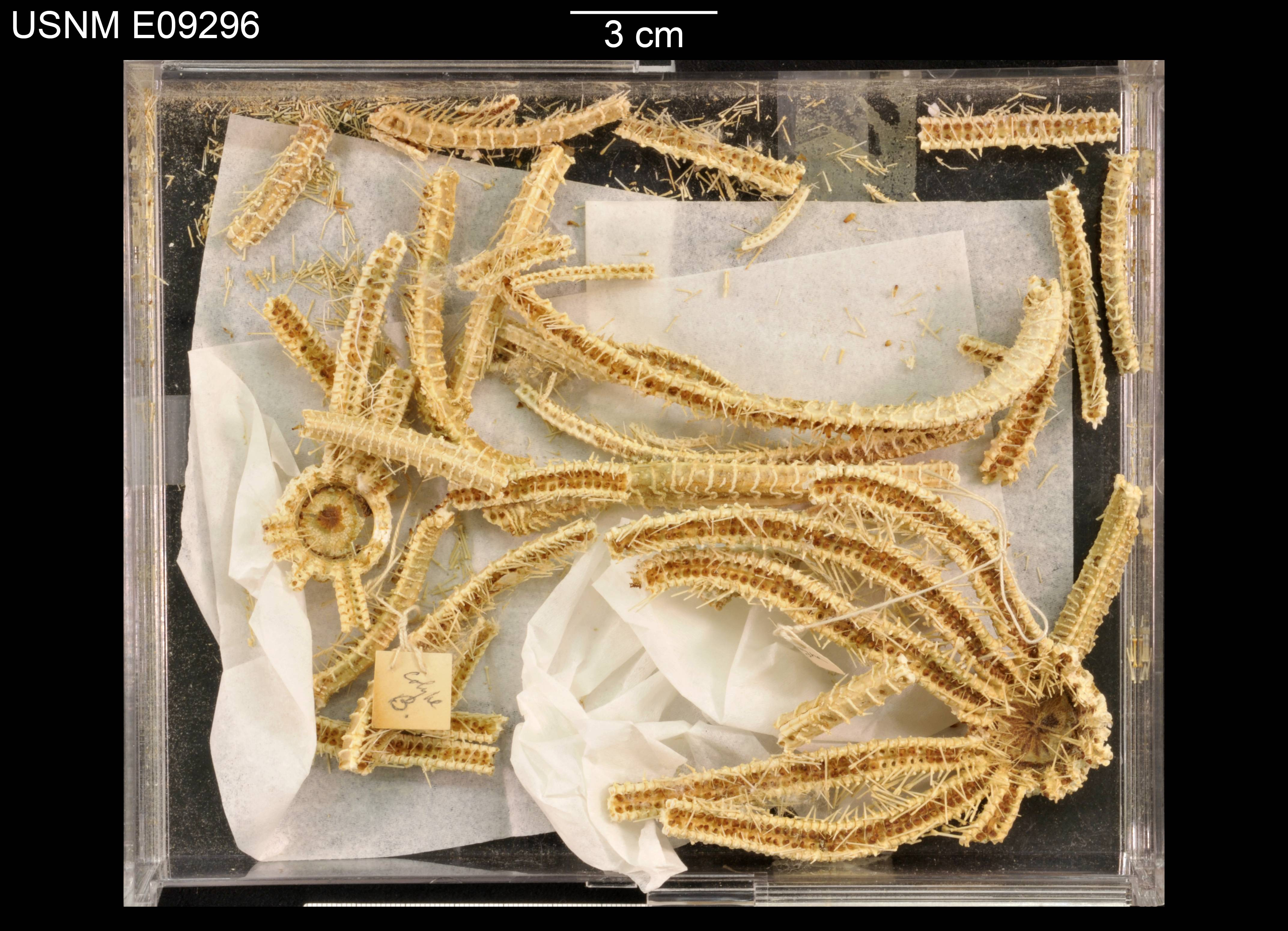
