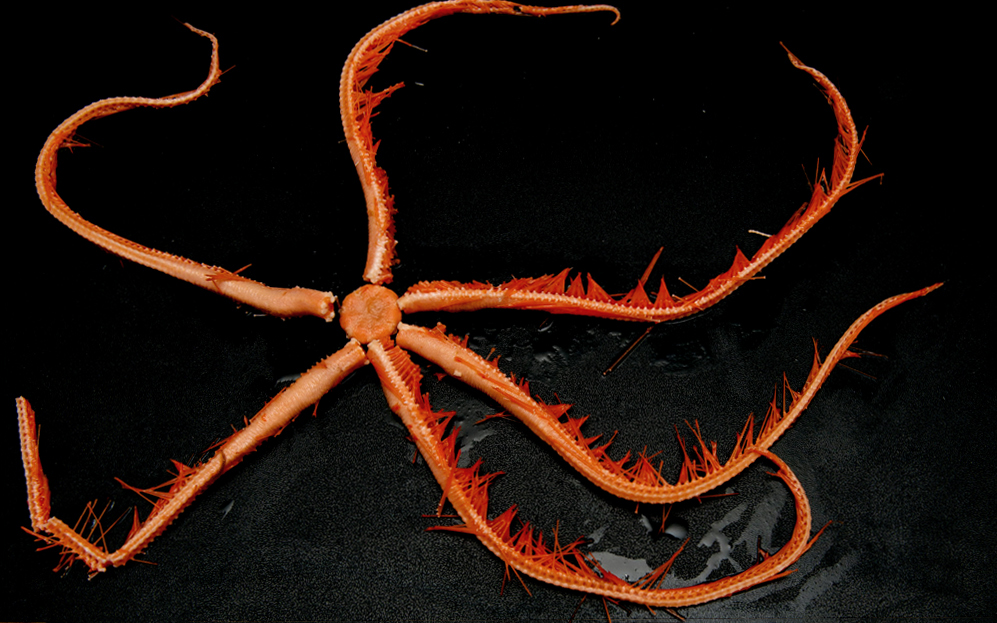

Scientific classification
- Kingdom: Animalia
- Phylum: Echinodermata
- Class: Asteroidea
- Order: Brisingida
- Family: Brisingidae
- Genus: Astrolirus
- Species: A. patricki

Binomial name
- Astrolirus patricki Zhang, Zhou, Xiao & Wang, 2020

= Astrolirus patricki =

Species of starfish

Astrolirus patricki is a species of starfish in the family Brisingidae. It is a deep-sea species found on seamounts in the northwestern Pacific Ocean, at a depth of between 1,458–2,125 metres (4,783–6,972 ft).

This generally orange asteroidea has seven long spiny arms, allowing them to be excellent suspension feeders in deep waters. They extend their arms to catch food particles suspended in the water. Their arm skeleton is a mosaic of abutting plates, and each pair of arms contains a set of sexual organs and eyes.

This species was discovered to science in 2013, and described in 2020. All known specimens of the species were observed attached to hexactinellid sponges, indicating a close, possibly commensal, relationship between both taxa. Due to this apparent relationship with sponges, the species was named Astrolirus patricki as a reference to Patrick Star, an anthropomorphic starfish character from the television series SpongeBob SquarePants.

In 2021, the World Register of Marine Species selected A. patricki as one of "ten remarkable new species from 2020".
