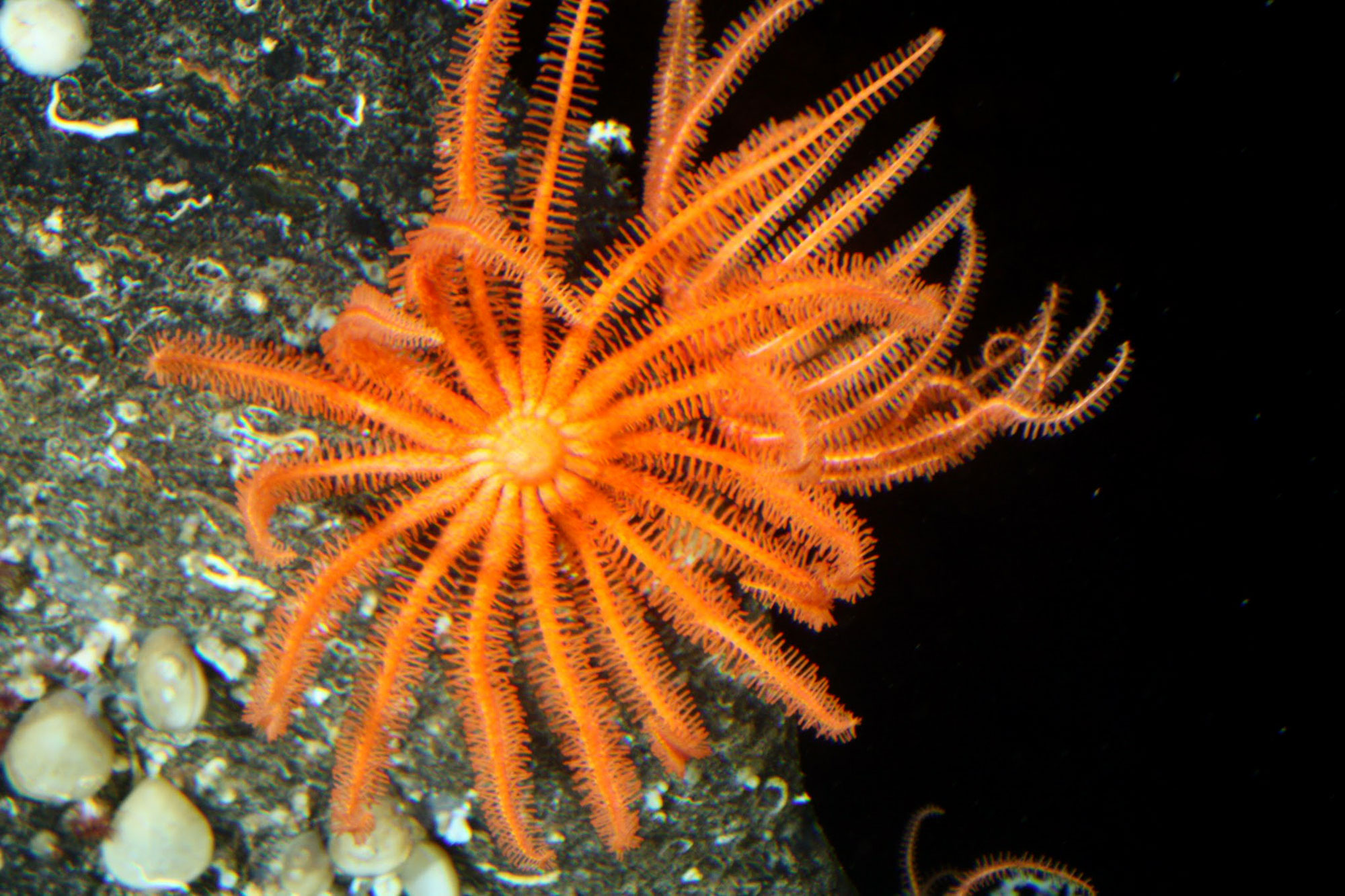

Scientific classification
- Kingdom: Animalia
- Phylum: Echinodermata
- Class: Asteroidea
- Order: Brisingida
- Family: Brisingidae
- Genus: Novodinia
- Species: N. antillensis

Binomial name
- Novodinia antillensis (A.H. Clark, 1934)

Synonyms
- Odinia antillensis A.H. Clark, 1934

= Novodinia antillensis =

Species of starfish

Novodinia antillensis, the velcro sea star, is a species of starfish in the family Brisingidae. It is found in the deep sea in the tropical and subtropical western Atlantic Ocean, being quite common at a depth of around 500 m (1,640 ft) on the Mesoamerican Reef off Roatán, Honduras.

== Description ==
This starfish has ten to fourteen long tapering arms with distinctive large eyespots on the tips. These are each composed of about a hundred complex ocelli; on close examination these structures were found to be virtually devoid of sensory structures and may be non-functional. The disc and arms of this starfish are clad in spines, themselves armed with pedicellariae (small claw or wrench-shaped organs).

== Ecology ==
Novodinia antillensis perches on the branches of arboreal deep water corals, extending its arms into the water column to catch small crustaceans drifting past. The arms form a feeding fan, the pedicellariae grasp and secure the prey, and the arms form loops that surround the food item and take it to the mouth.

On the Cape Fear coral mound off North Carolina at a depth of around 400 m (1,300 ft), the dominant macrobenthos included N. antillensis as well as the American conger (Conger oceanicus), the alfonsino (Beryx decadactylus), sea urchins and squat lobsters (Eumunida picta). Each species, especially the fish, had its own favoured niche habitat, often on the southern and southwestern slopes of the mound. More transient visitors to the seamount included the shortbeard codling (Laemonema barbatulum) and the blackbelly rosefish (Helicolenus dactylopterus) which were mostly found on the lower slopes and base of the mound.

== Research ==
Two novel steroidal saponins have been isolated from N. antillensis, being identified as Sch 725737 and Sch 725739.
