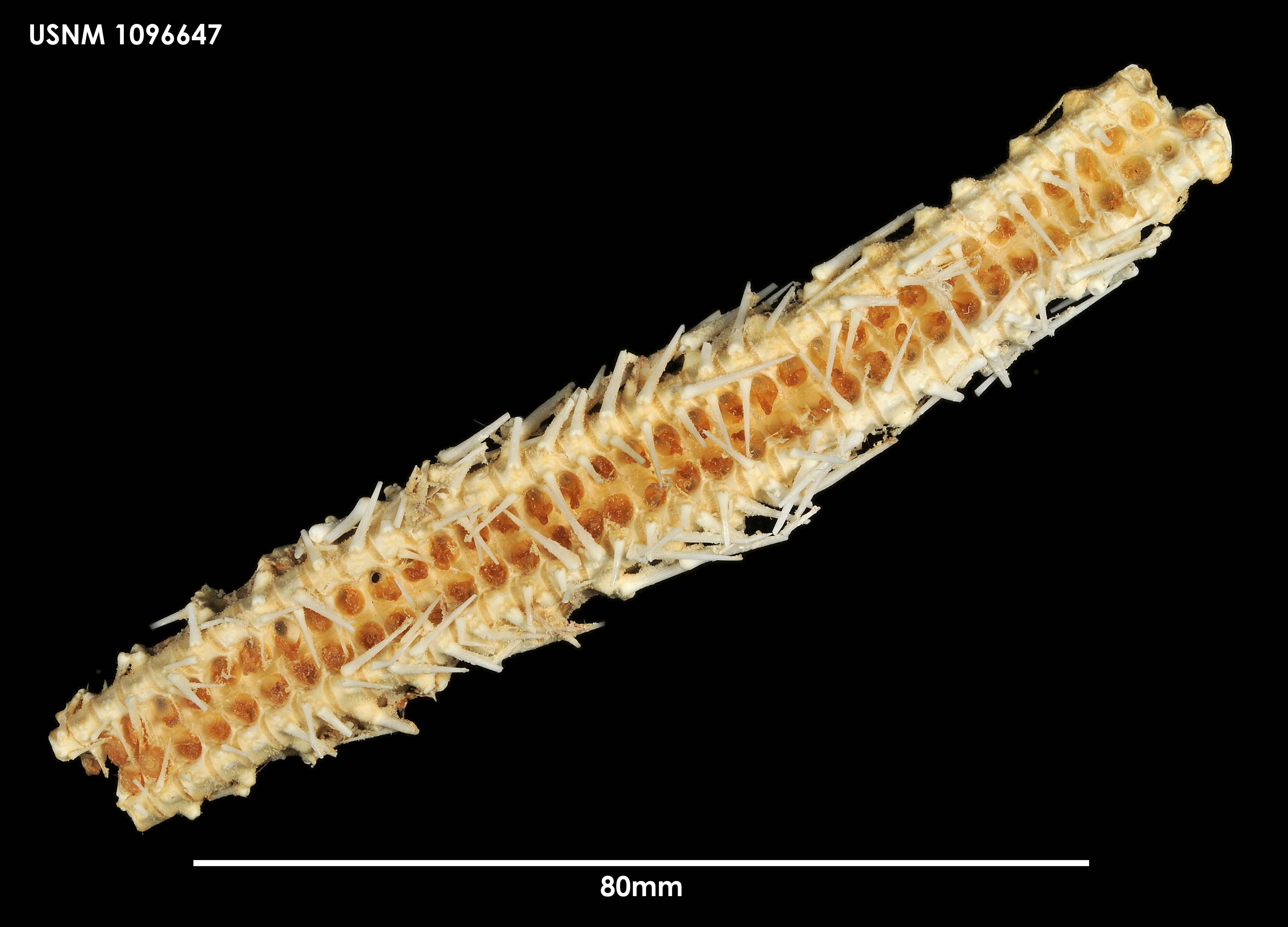

Scientific classification
- Domain: Eukaryota
- Kingdom: Animalia
- Phylum: Echinodermata
- Class: Asteroidea
- Order: Brisingida
- Family: Brisingidae
- Genus: Brisinga
- Species: B. tasmani

Binomial name
- Brisinga tasmani H.E.S. Clark, 1970

= Brisinga tasmani =

Species of starfish in the family Brisingidae

Brisinga synaptoma is a species of starfish in the family Brisingidae, found in deep sea waters off the coast of New Zealand.

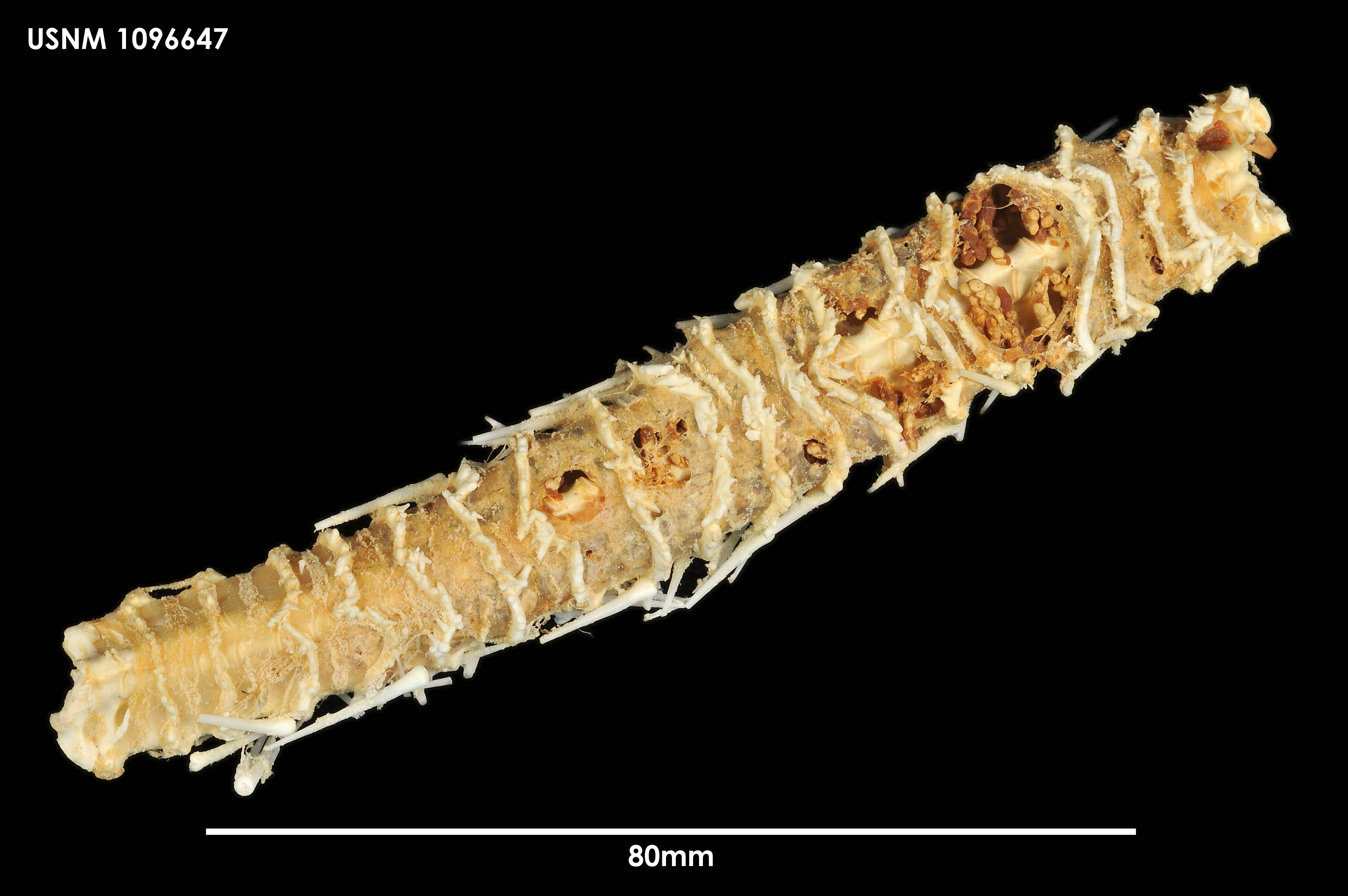

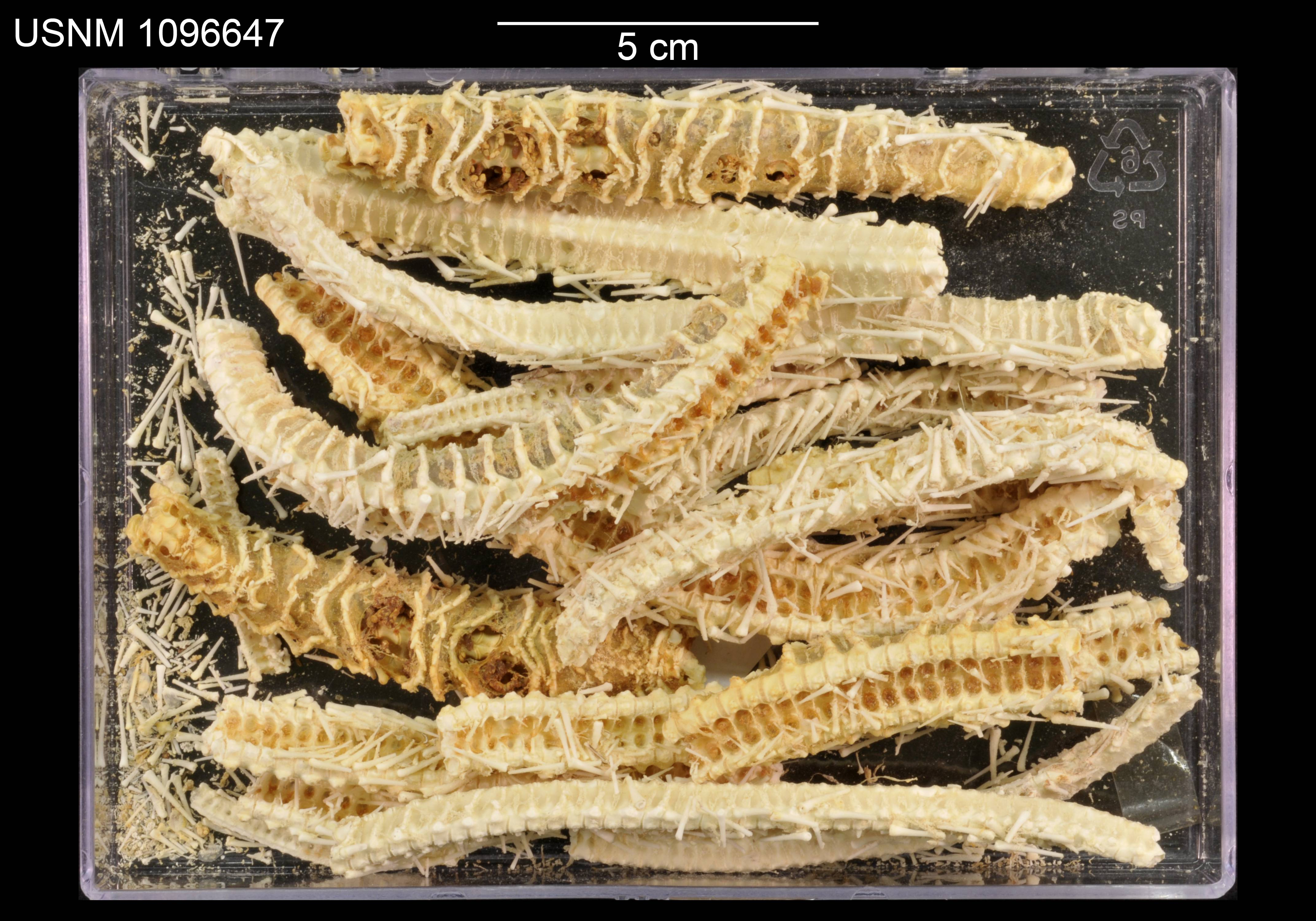

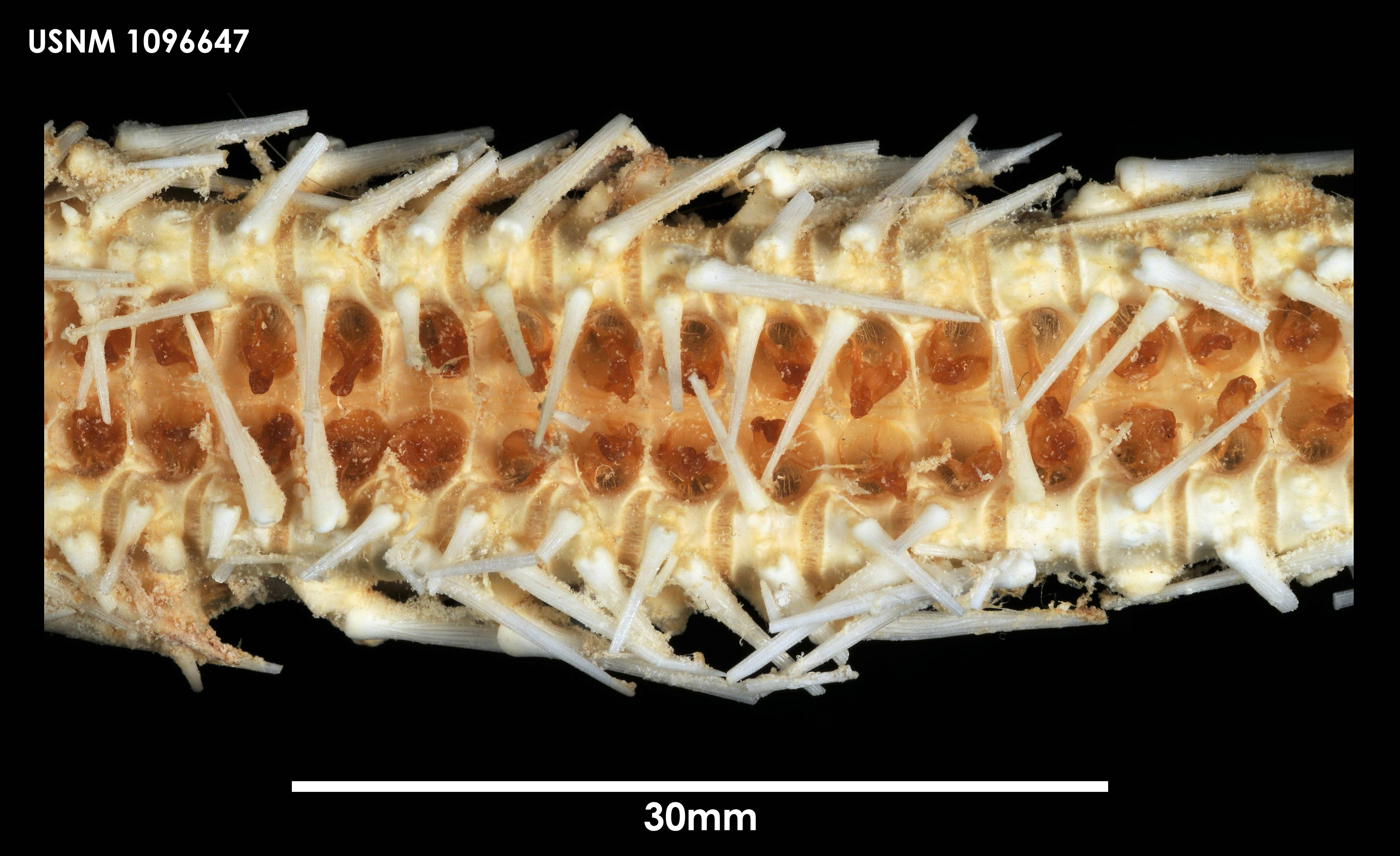
