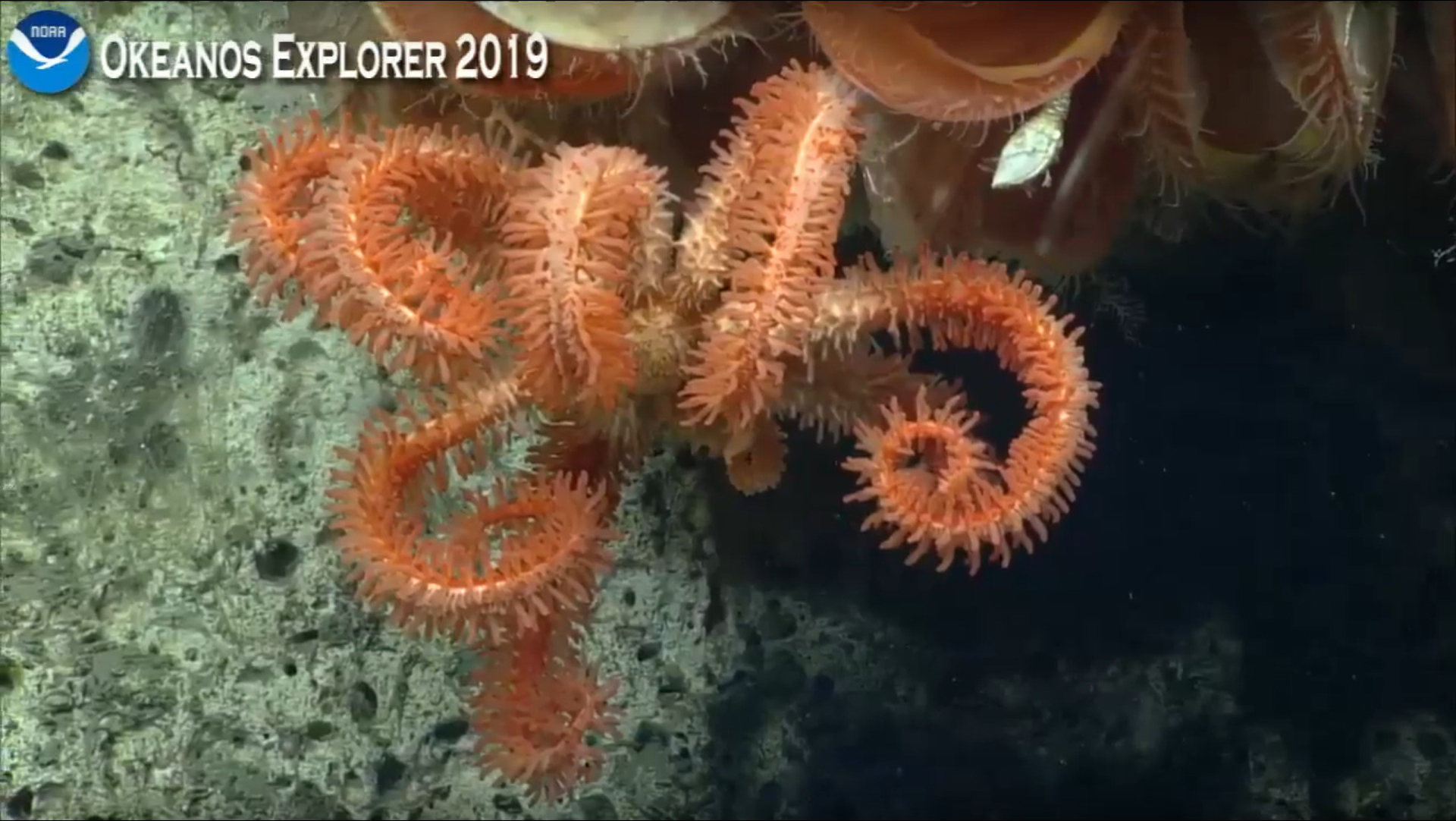

Scientific classification
- Kingdom: Animalia
- Phylum: Echinodermata
- Class: Asteroidea
- Order: Brisingida
- Family: Brisingidae
- Genus: Novodinia
- Species: N. americana

Binomial name
- Novodinia americana (Verrill, 1880)

Synonyms
- Brisinga americana Verrill, 1880

= Novodinia americana =

Species of starfish

Novodina americana is a species of starfish found off the coast of Greenland. A 2018 study of deep-water starfish species found that N. americana was both bioluminescent and, unexpectedly for an inhabitant of the aphotic zone, to have eyes that have among the highest resolutions found this far among starfish.

== Feeding Behaviors ==
Studies have found that the Novodinia americana is a carnivorous filter feeder that ingests benthopelagic crustaceans (primarily copepods).
