= Brisingenes margoae =

Scientific classification
- Kingdom: Animalia
- Phylum: Echinodermata
- Class: Asteroidea
- Order: Brisingida
- Family: Brisingidae
- Genus: Brisingenes
- Species: B. margoae

Binomial name
- Brisingenes margoae Mah, 2016

Species of echinoderm

Brisingenes margoae is a species of sea stars belonging to the family Brisingidae. Brisingids are distinguished from the more conventional five-rayed asteroids by their multiple arms with long-spines upheld into the water column in order to capture food from the water current Ecologically, brisingids are significant in that they exploit food from pelagic sources, making it available to the benthic nutrient flow, where it might not be otherwise available
