= Midgardia =

Scientific classification
- Kingdom: Animalia
- Phylum: Echinodermata
- Class: Asteroidea
- Order: Brisingida
- Family: Brisingidae
- Genus: Midgardia; Downey, 1972
- Species: M. xandaros

Binomial name
- Midgardia xandaros Downey, 1972

Species of starfish

Midgardia xandaros, a brisingid, has the longest known arms of any sea star. It is the only member of the genus Midgardia.

== Taxonomy ==
M. xandaros was first described in 1972 by Maureen Downey, an American zoologist. The genus name Midgardia refers to the Midgard serpent, which lies at the bottom of the sea in Norse mythology., in reference to the depths at which M. xandaros is found. The specific epithet xandaros is Greek, meaning "fantastic monster".
