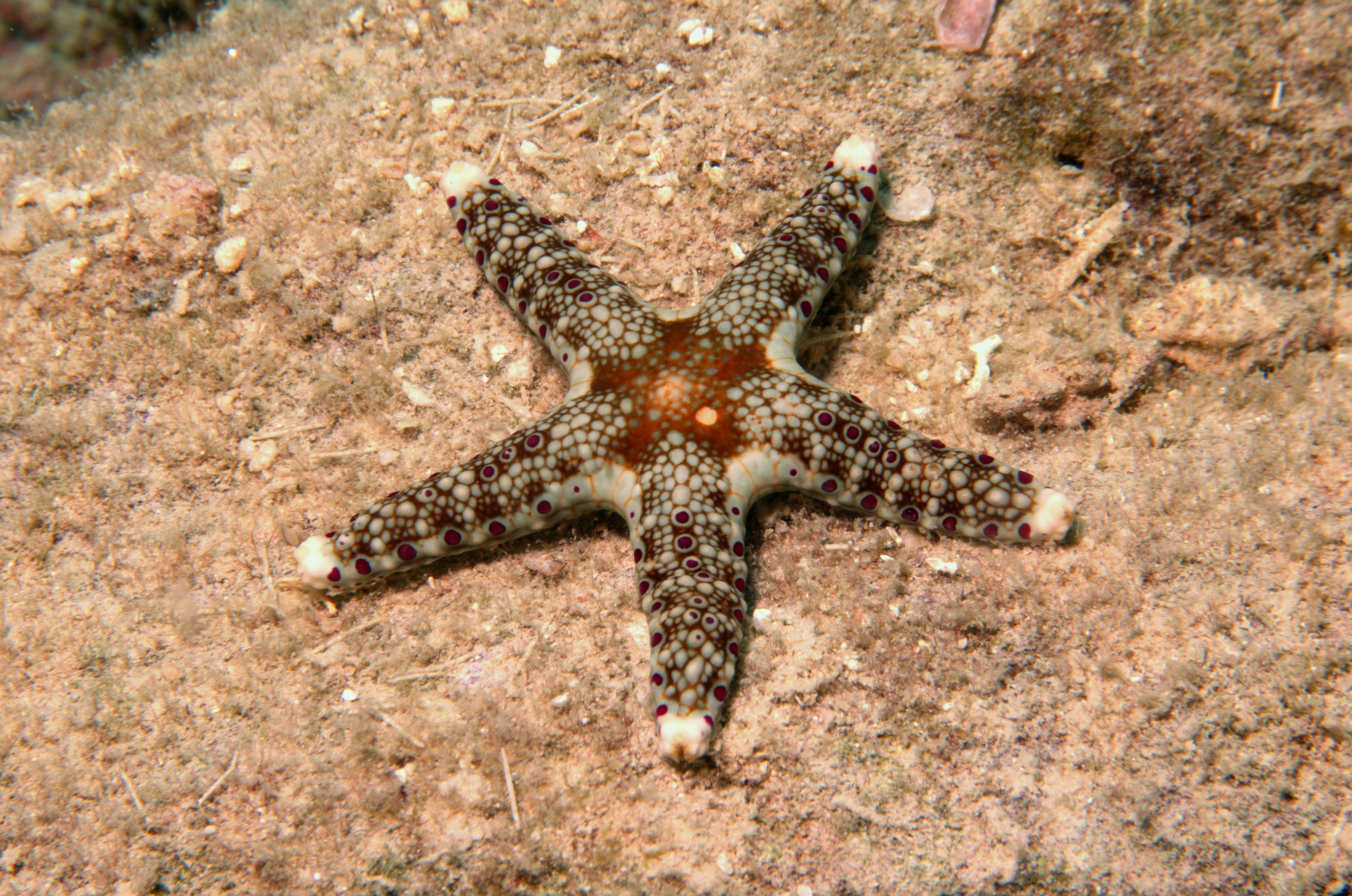

Scientific classification
- Kingdom: Animalia
- Phylum: Echinodermata
- Class: Asteroidea
- Order: Valvatida
- Family: Goniasteridae
- Genus: Neoferdina
- Species: N. cumingi

Binomial name
- Neoferdina cumingi (Gray, 1840)

Synonyms
- Ferdina cancellata (Grube, 1857); Ferdina cancellata tylota Fisher, 1925; Ferdina cumingi Gray, 1840; Ferdina ocellata H.L. Clark, 1921; Neoferdina cancellata (Grube, 1857); Neoferdina ocellata (H.L. Clark, 1921); Neoferdina tylota Fisher, 1925; Scytaster cancellatus Grube, 1857

= Neoferdina cumingi =

Species of starfish

Neoferdina cumingi, also known as Cuming's sea star, is a species of starfish in the family Goniasteridae. It is native to the tropical Indo-Pacific region.

== Description ==
This starfish has a wide variety of colour forms but tends to be cryptic. It is typically symmetrically patterned with distinctive spots, some running laterally around the starfish's margin and others in rows which run down the five arms. In one colour morph, the spots on disc and arms were dark purple and those near the tips of the arms were reddish. The tip of each arm curls upwards, and the tube feet near the tip seem to have a chemosensory function.

== Distribution ==
Neoferdina cumingi is native to shallow water reefs in the tropical Indo-Pacific region. Its range extends from Christmas Island in the Indian Ocean, through northwestern and northeastern Australia, Malaysia, Indonesia and the Philippines, to the Central Pacific.

== Ecology ==
Although the feeding habits of this starfish have not been studied, it is part of the order Valvatida, and starfish in this order typically evert their stomach to engulf and digest their food before retracting the stomach back into the disc, bringing the partially digested prey with it.

Like other starfish, this species is likely to be able to reproduce asexually after splitting apart, with even pieces as small as one fifth of the original volume being able to regenerate as long as the madreporite is present. Some members of Valvatida are hermaphrodites and others have separate sexes. In Neoferdina cumingi gametes are dispersed from the gonopore, which may be on the aboral (upper) surface or on the oral (under) surface of the animal. Two types of brachiolaria larvae appear to exist; some develop from yolky eggs and are non-swimming and non-feeding, while others have cilia and can swim, but do not feed. The larvae are planktonic and drift with the currents for about four weeks before they need to find shallow water areas in which to settle, often at a considerable distance from their origins.
