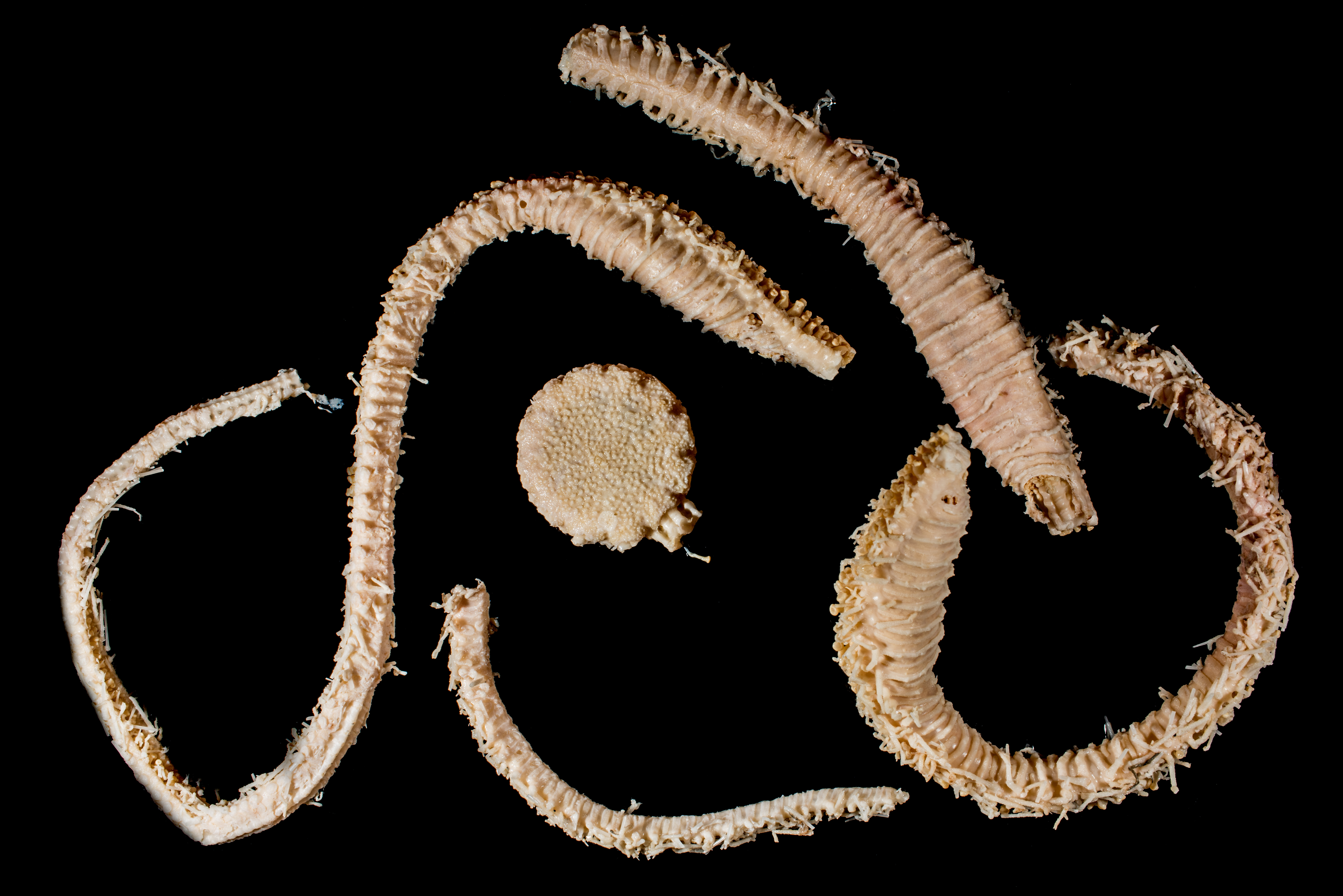

Scientific classification
- Kingdom: Animalia
- Phylum: Echinodermata
- Class: Asteroidea
- Order: Brisingida
- Family: Brisingidae
- Genus: Brisinga
- Species: B. endecacnemos

Binomial name
- Brisinga endecacnemos Asbjørnsen, 1856

= Brisinga endecacnemos =

Species of starfish

Brisinga endecacnemos is a species of starfish found in deep waters off Norway, Rockall Trough off Ireland, Cape Verde, to the Mid-Atlantic Ridge. The species is described as being a "brilliant red", with a body measuring between 2.8 cm and 3.0 cm and 9 to 12 limbs generally measuring over 33 cm. Upon its discovery, it was deemed to be an evolutionary link between ophiuroids and asteroids.

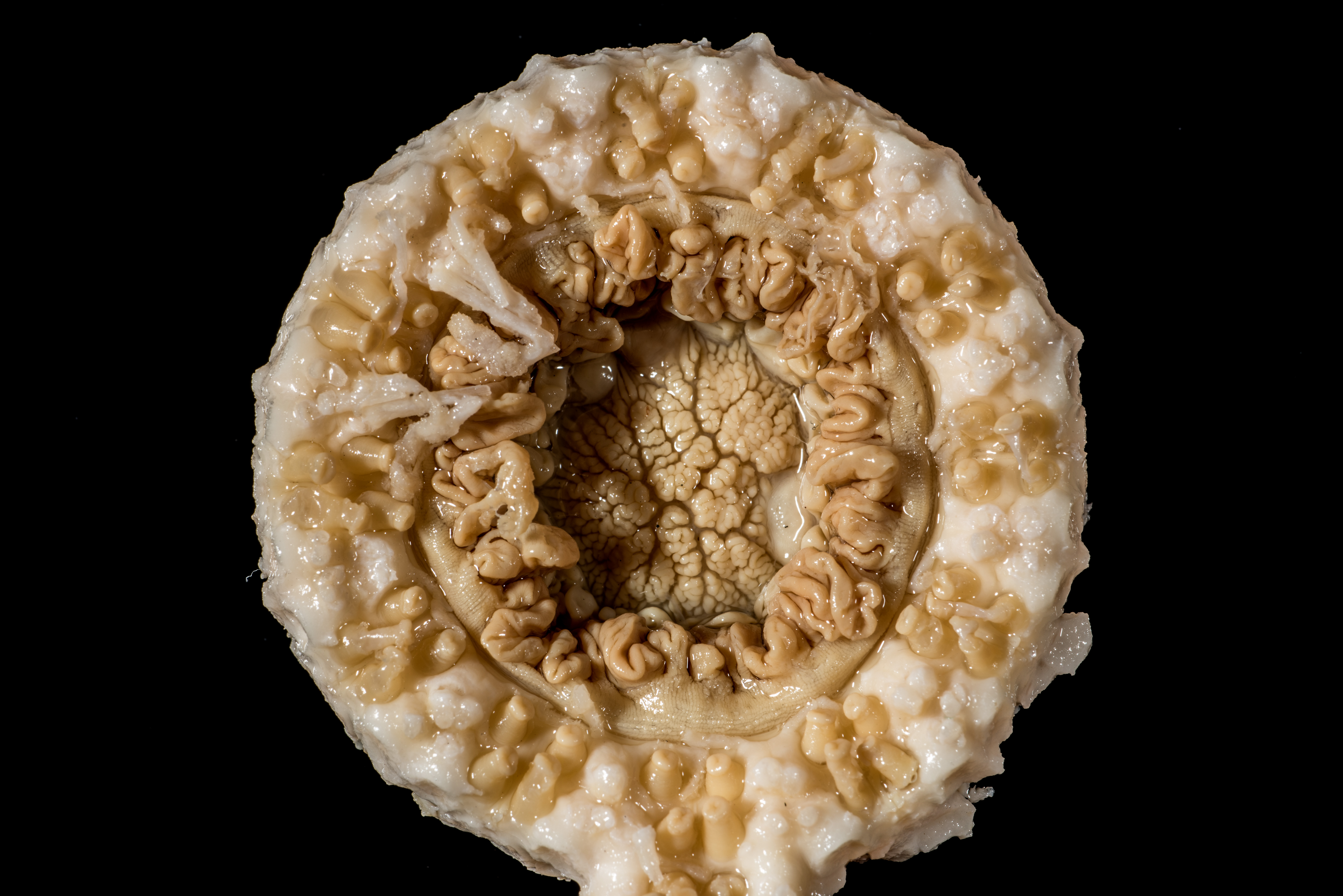

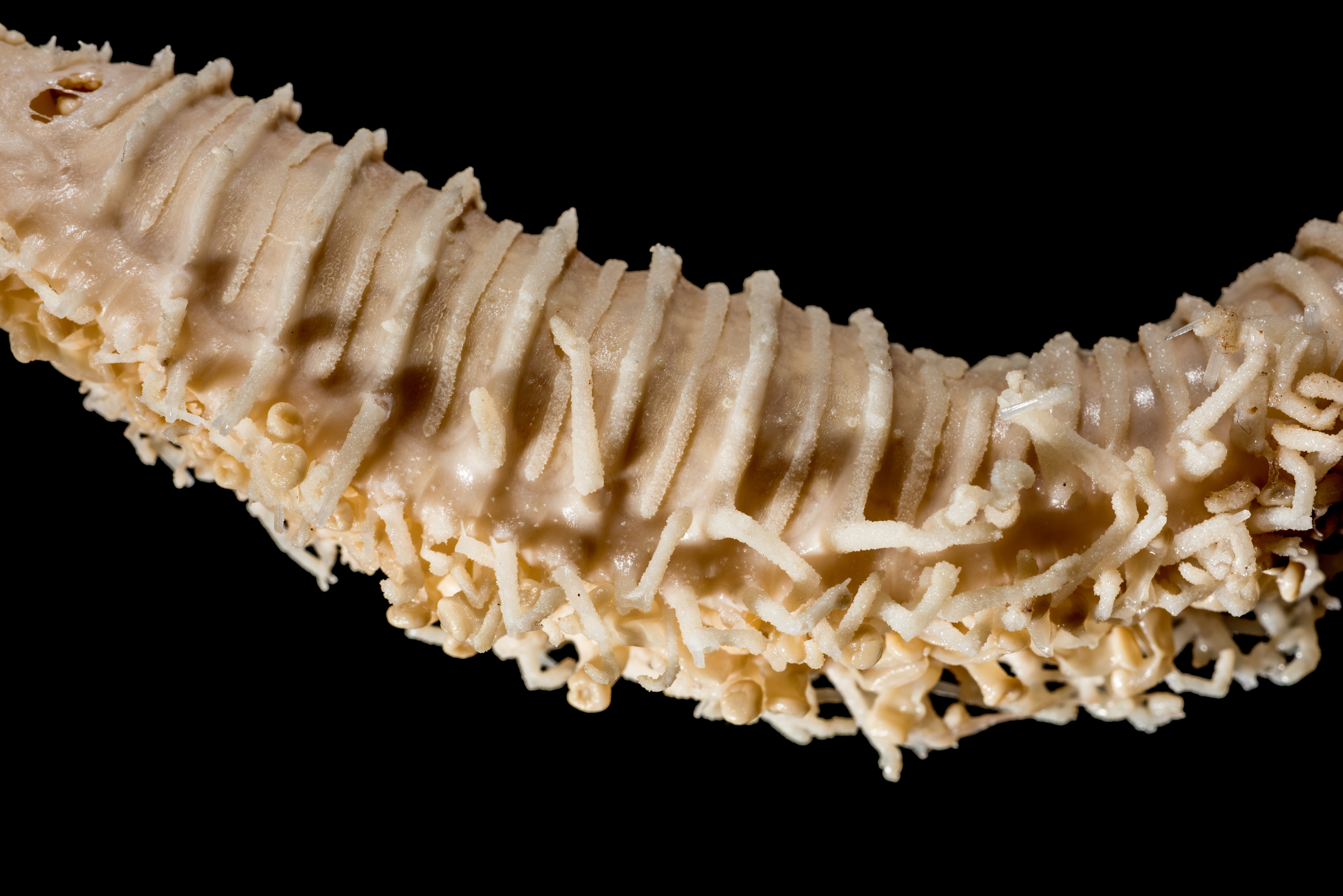

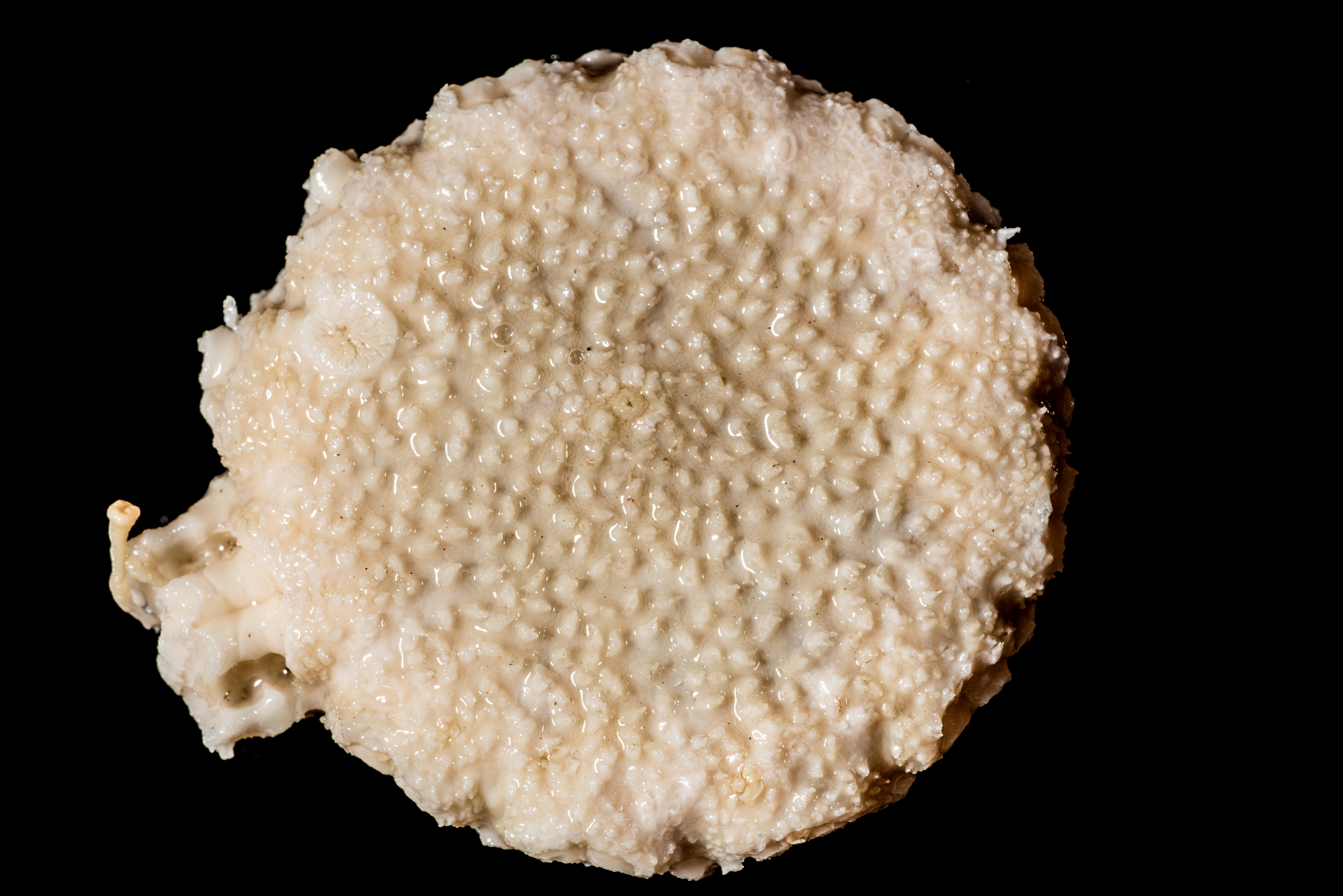

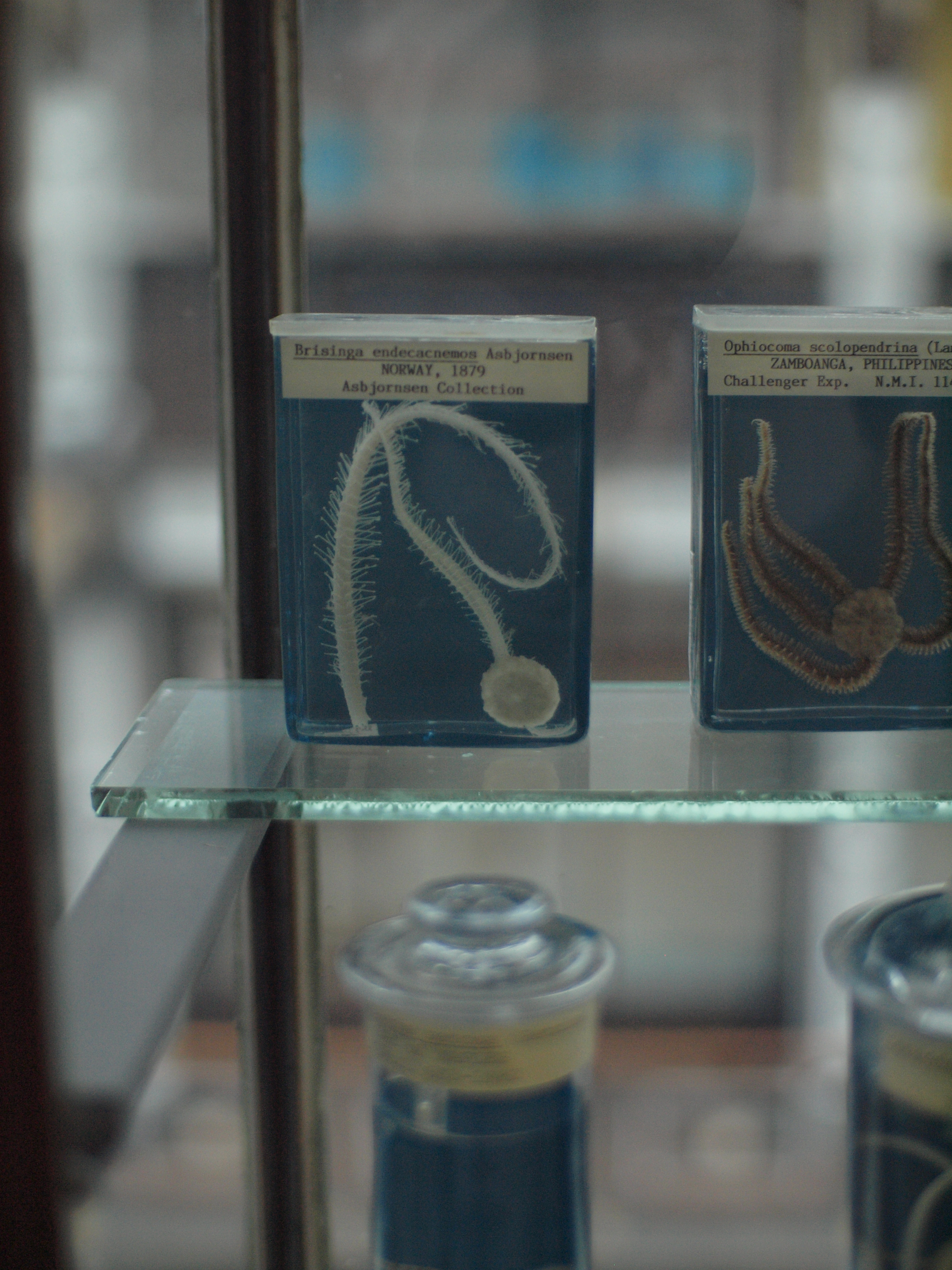
