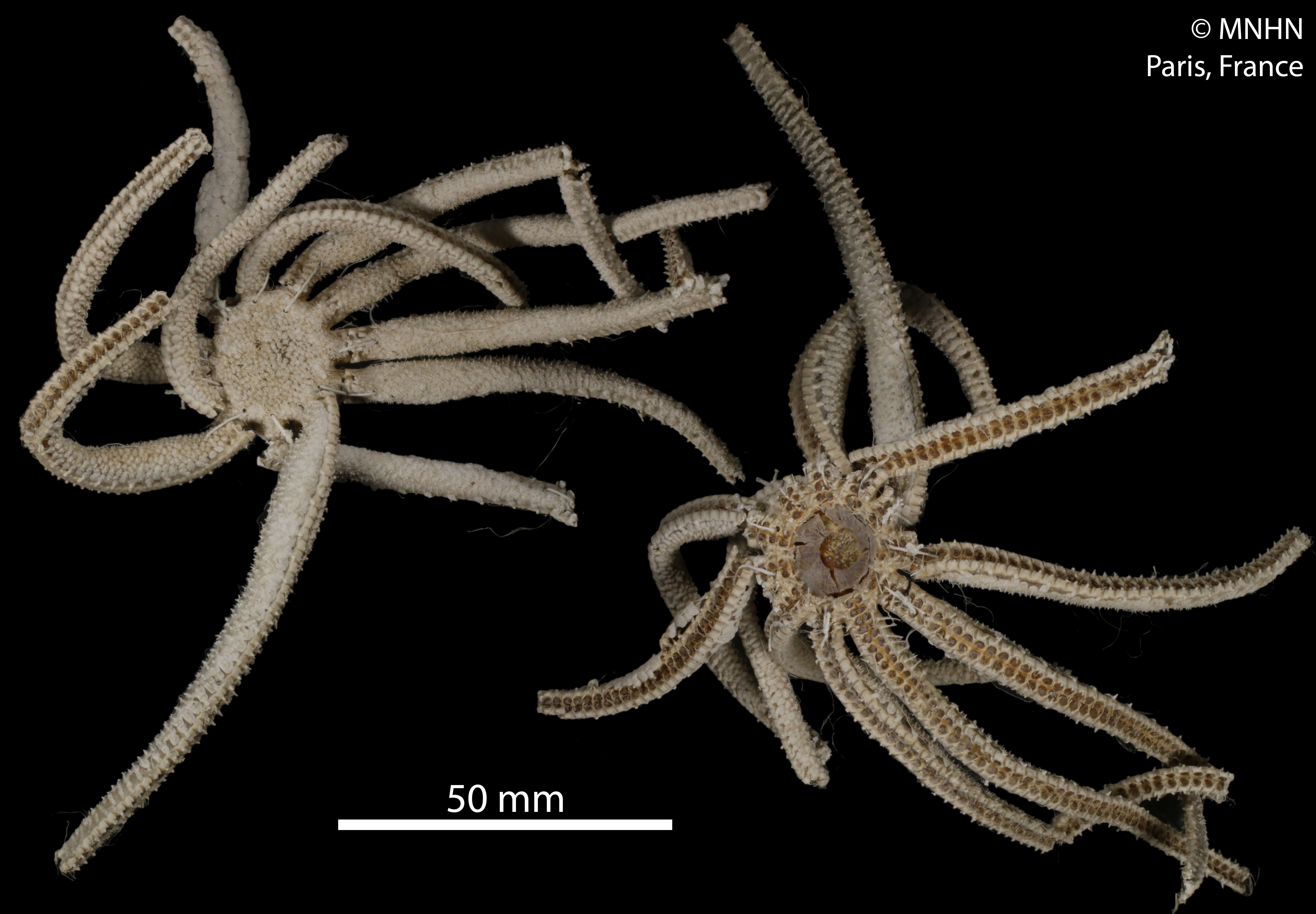
- Freyella elegans

Scientific classification
- Kingdom: Animalia
- Phylum: Echinodermata
- Class: Asteroidea
- Order: Brisingida
- Family: Freyellidae
- Genus: Freyella; Perrier, 1885

Species
- see text

= Freyella =

Genus of starfishes

Freyella is a genus of deep-sea-dwelling starfish in the order Brisingida.

== Species ==
There are currently 29 recognized species in this genus: -

- Freyella attenuata Sladen, 1889
- Freyella breviispina (H.L. Clark, 1920)
- Freyella dimorpha Sladen, 1889
- Freyella drygalskii (Döderlein, 1928)
- Freyella echinata Sladen, 1889
- Freyella elegans (Verrill, 1884)
- Freyella felleyra McKnight, 2006
- Freyella flabellispina Korovchinsky & Galkin, 1984
- Freyella formosa Korovchinsky, 1976
- Freyella fragilissima Sladen, 1889
- Freyella giardi Koehler, 1907
- Freyella heroina Sladen, 1889
- Freyella hexactis Baranova, 1957
- Freyella indica Koehler, 1909
- Freyella insignis Ludwig, 1905
- Freyella kurilokamchatica Korovchinsky, 1976
- Freyella loricata Korovchinsky & Galkin, 1984
- Freyella macropedicellaria Korovchinsky & Galkin, 1984
- Freyella microplax (Fisher, 1917)
- Freyella microspina Verrill, 1894
- Freyella mutabila Korovchinsky, 1976
- Freyella octoradiata (H.L. Clark, 1920)
- Freyella oligobrachia (H.L. Clark, 1920)
- Freyella pacifica Ludwig, 1905
- Freyella pennata Sladen, 1889
- Freyella propinqua Ludwig, 1905
- Freyella recta Koehler, 1907
- Freyella remex Sladen, 1889
- Freyella vitjazi Korovchinsky & Galkin, 1984
