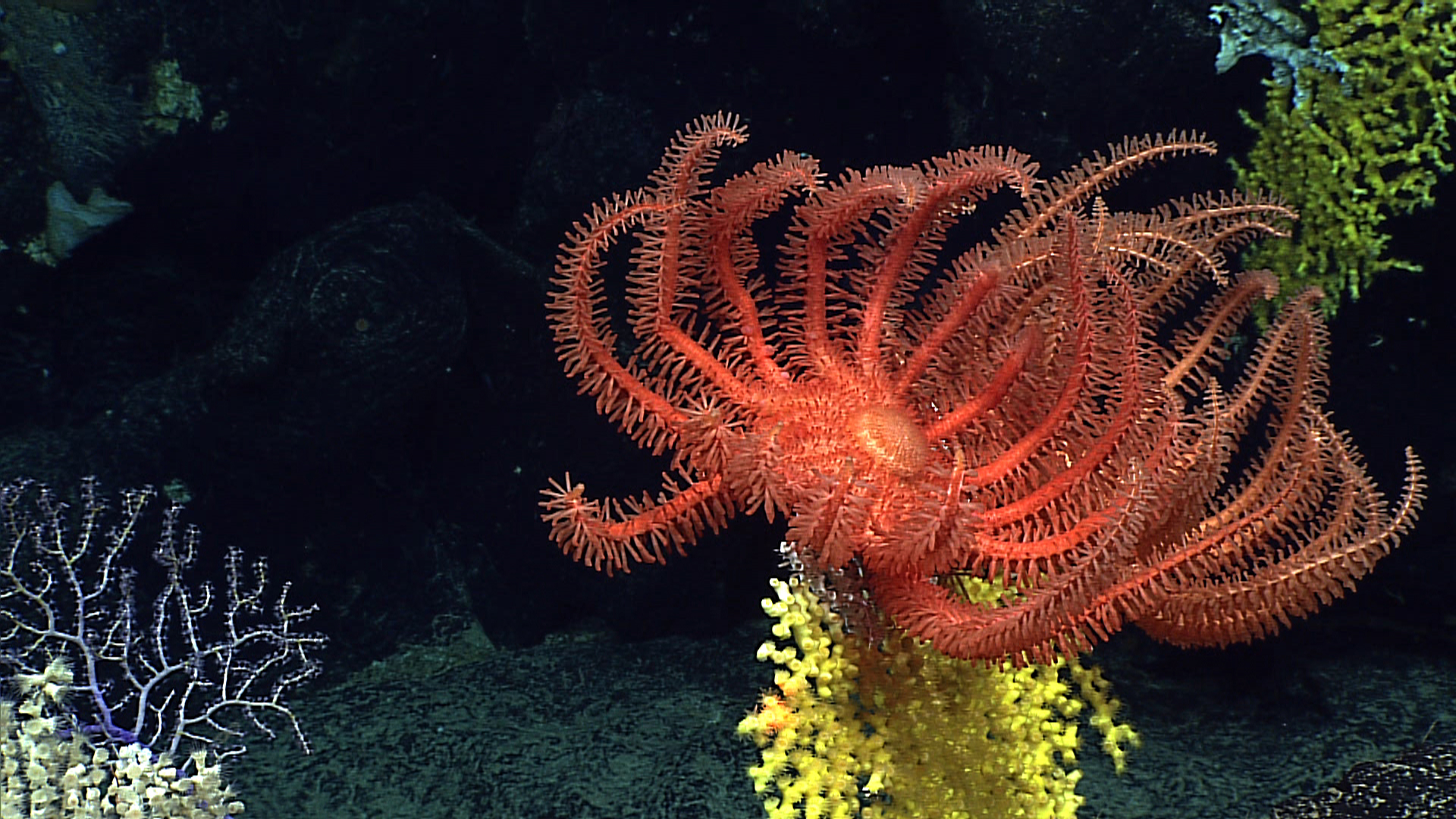
- Novodinia pacifica

Scientific classification
- Kingdom: Animalia
- Phylum: Echinodermata
- Class: Asteroidea
- Order: Brisingida
- Family: Brisingidae
- Genus: Novodinia; Dartnall, Pawson, Pope & B.J.Smith, 1969

= Novodinia =

Genus of echinoderms

Novodinia is a genus of echinoderms belonging to the family Brisingidae.

The genus has almost cosmopolitan distribution.

Species:

- Novodinia americana (Verrill, 1880)
- Novodinia antillensis (A.H. Clark, 1934)
- Novodinia austini (Koehler, 1909)
- Novodinia australis (H.L. Clark, 1916)
- Novodinia clarki (Koehler, 1909)
- Novodinia homonyma Downey, 1986
- Novodinia magister (Fisher, 1917)
- Novodinia novaezelandiae (H.E.S.Clark, 1962)
- Novodinia pacifica (Fisher, 1906)
- Novodinia pandina (Sladen, 1889)
- Novodinia penichra (Fisher, 1916)
- Novodinia radiata Aziz & Jangoux, 1985
- Novodinia semicoronata (Perrier, 1885)
