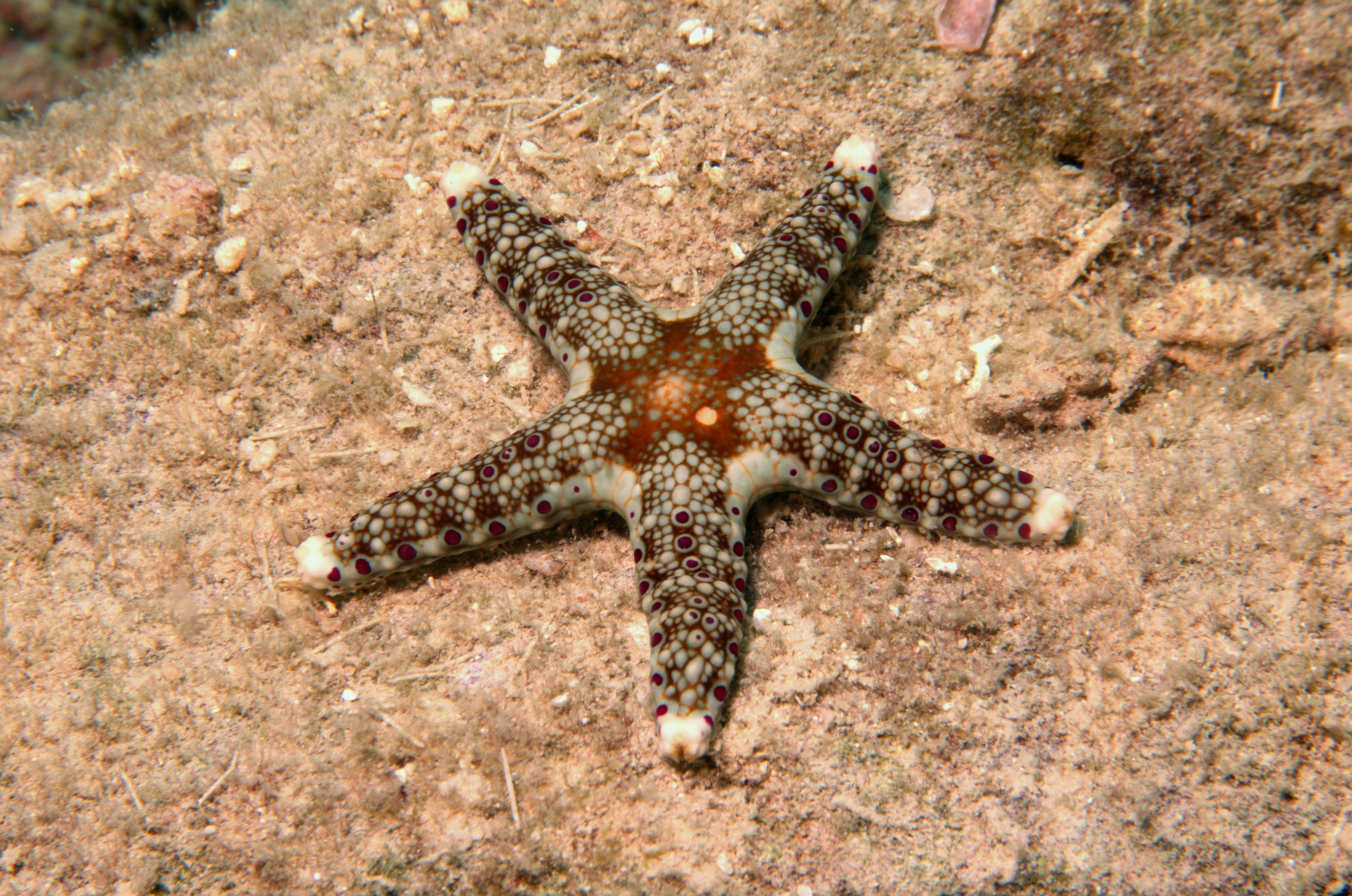
- Neoferdina cumingi

Scientific classification
- Kingdom: Animalia
- Phylum: Echinodermata
- Class: Asteroidea
- Order: Valvatida
- Family: Goniasteridae
- Subfamily: Ferdininae
- Genus: Neoferdina; Livingstone, 1931

Type species
- Neoferdina cumingi

Species
- See text.

= Neoferdina =

Genus of starfishes

Neoferdina is a genus of starfish in the family Goniasteridae. Members of the genus are found in the Indo-Pacific region, mostly between the Andaman Isles to the West and the Wake Isles, the Marshall Isles and Fiji to the east. The discovery of several species in the Seychelles widened the range considerably.

== Species ==
The following species are included in the genus according to the World Register of Marine Species:

Image	Scientific name	Distribution
	Neoferdina akala Mah, 2026	New Caledonia
	Neoferdina annae Mah, 2017	New Caledonia
	Neoferdina antigorum Mah, 2017	
	Neoferdina cumingi (Gray, 1840)	New Caledonia
	Neoferdina gigantea (Liao, 1982)	
	Neoferdina glyptodisca (Fisher, 1913)	Philippine Islands
	Neoferdina insolita Livingstone, 1936	Indonesia
	Neoferdina japonica Oguro & Misaki, 1986	Japan
	Neoferdina kuhli (Müller & Troschel, 1842)	Tanzania and Java
	Neoferdina longibrachia Kogure & Fujita, 2012	Ryukyu Islands
	Neoferdina momo Mah, 2017	Madagascar
	Neoferdina offreti (Koehler, 1910)	Aldabra, Palau Islands and Seychelles
	Neoferdina oni Mah, 2017	
