= Ailsa McGown Clark =

British zoologist (1926–2014)

- Born: 1926; Hendon, Middlesex
- Died: 2014 (aged 87–88); Brighton, Sussex
- Occupation: Zoologist
- Years active: 1948–1986
- Employer: Natural History Museum, London
- Honours: Species Ophiolepis ailsae named for her (1897)

Ailsa McGown Clark (1926–2014) was a British zoologist, who principally studied echinoderms (such as starfishes and sea urchins) and was a specialist on asteroidea. She worked at the Natural History Museum for most of her career.

== Life ==
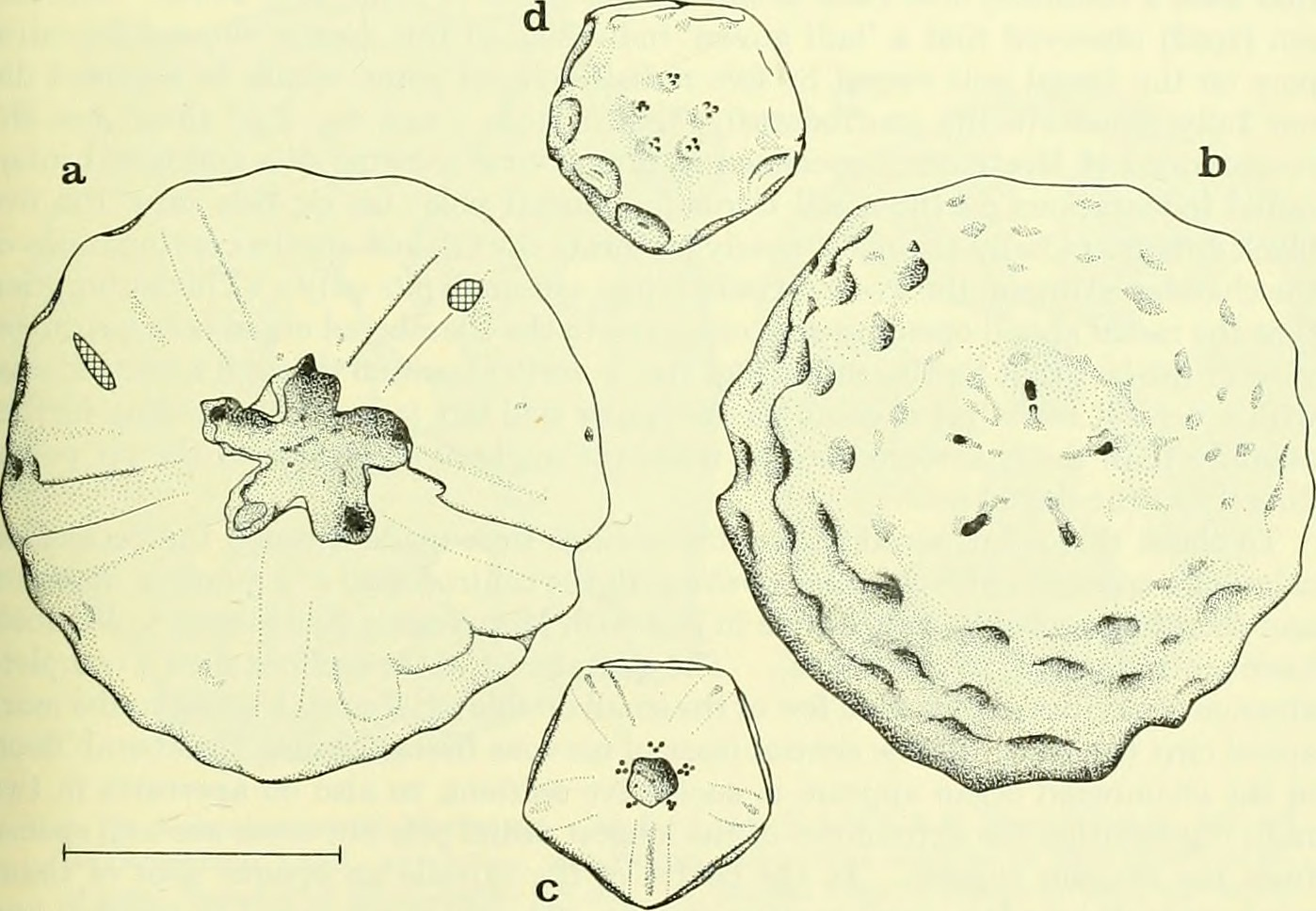
Line drawings of crinoids by Ailsa M. Clark in the Bulletin of the British Museum (Natural History)

Ailsa McGown Clark was born in Hendon. From 1948, Clark was curator of Echinoderms at the British Museum (Natural History). During 1954, she conducted research into ophiurums (brittle stars) at the Allan Hancock Foundation for Scientific Research, at the University of Southern California.

It is noted that Ailsa McGown Clark was one of a number of unrelated Clarks who became experts in echinoderms. Libbie Hyman made reference to this 'odd circumstance' in a review of Starfishes and their relations for the Quarterly Review of Biology. She said of the book itself that it would 'serve admirably to introduce beginners to this important phylum.'

On the death of her colleague, Dr. Austin Hobart Clark, she completed his work A monograph of the existing crinoids (1967). Her efforts in doing so were praised:

The description of the entire world fauna of over 600 species of comatulids has now been completed. All parts, except this latest, were written by Austin H. Clark, of the U.S. National Museum. On his death (in October 1954) he left an unfinished manuscript which Ailsa M. Clark, of the British Museum, undertook to complete and illustrate. Although the separate portions due to each of the authors are indicated, the work reads as an integrated whole. This is doubtless due in part to the happy circumstance of both authors having worked together during the last year of Austin Clark's long and productive life; but it is also a tribute to the skill with which Miss Clark has completed her task, conscious of an obligation to present the senior author's views, while at the same time moderating them by her own where these differed.

Clark illustrated the text with 'a series of line drawings of the species' described, which offered 'a more precise means of comparing material with the descriptions'. The reviewer (Barry Fell) also noted another 'important innovation' of Clark's:

a major revision of the family Antedonidae, a group of great importance in cool temperate, polar and deep-sea faunas. This study, undertaken by Miss Clark some years since, but only now formally published, comprises the section of the monograph of most value to the general marine biologist.

Between 1968 and 1969, Clark also published three reviews of others' works in Nature: 'Ophiuroids of Soviet Seas', 'Irregular Echinoids', and 'Russian Sea Urchins'.

Clark retired aged 60 in 1986, but remained active. She died in Brighton on 24 Sep 2014.

== Legacy ==
The species Ophiolepsis ailsae was named for Clark, 'in recognition of a highly esteemed student of the Echinodermata on her retirement from the British Museum (Natural History)'. The World Asteroidea Database (WAD) is largely drawn from the "Asteroid Names List", developed principally by Clark.

Former colleagues believed that Clark's major legacy would be 'the revisions and faunistic works she and various other co-workers produced'. The archives of the Natural History Museum hold various papers relating to Clark and her work.

== Bibliography ==
- A revision of the sea-stars of the genus Tethyaster, with 12 plates (1954)
- Starfishes and their relations (1962)
- Japanese and other Ophiuroids from the collections of the Münich Museum (1965)
- Notes on some tropical Indo-Pacific Ophiotrichids and Ophiodermatids (Ophiuroidea) (1968)
- Echinodermata Crinoidea (1970)
- Notes on the family Amphiuridae (Ophiuroidea) (1970)
- Monograph of shallow-water Indo-West Pacific echinoderms (1971)
- Some crinoids from the Indian Ocean (1972)
- Some new taxa of recent stalked Crinoidea (1973)
- Notes on some Echinoderms from southern Africa (1974)
- The echinoderms of Southern Africa (1976)
- Notes on deep-water Atlantic Crinoidea (1977)
- Starfishes and related echinoderms (1977)
- Notes on Atlantic and other Asteroidea: 1. Family Benthopectinidae (1981)
- Starfishes of the Atlantic (1992) with Maureen Downey
