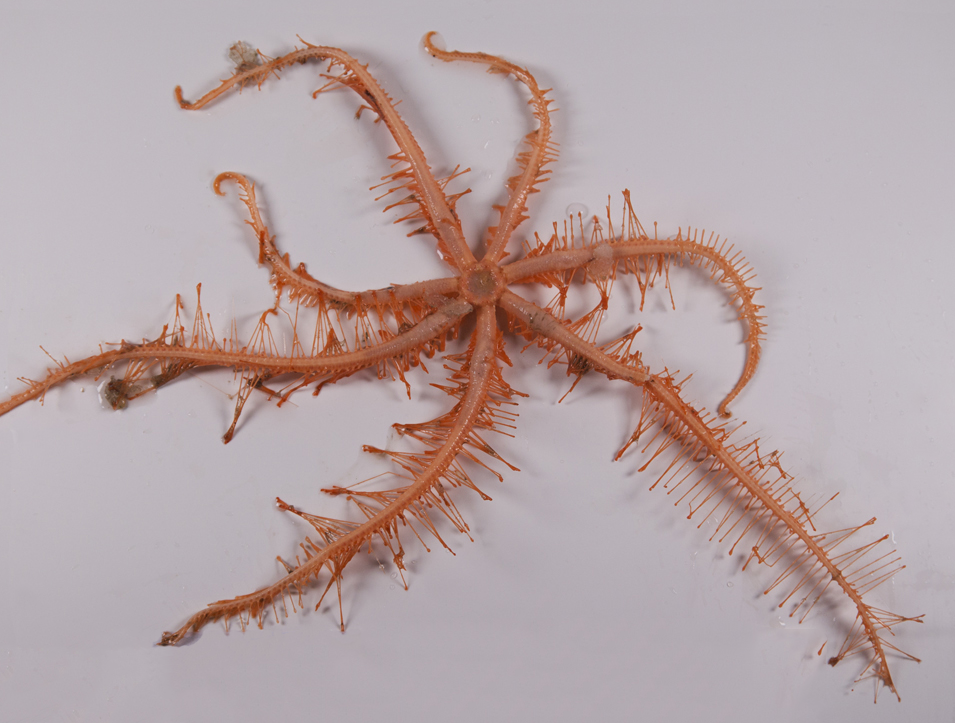
- Astrolirus patricki

Scientific classification
- Kingdom: Animalia
- Phylum: Echinodermata
- Class: Asteroidea
- Order: Brisingida
- Family: Brisingidae
- Genus: Astrolirus; Fisher, 1917

Species
- Astrolirus panamensis Astrolirus patricki

= Astrolirus =

Genus of star fish

Astrolirus is a genus of echinoderms belonging to the family Brisingidae. They are found in benthic habitats in the Pacific Ocean.

There are two known species:

- Astrolirus panamensis (Ludwig, 1905)
- Astrolirus patricki (Zhang, Zhou, Xiao & Wang, 2020)
