= Brisinga =

Scientific classification
- Kingdom: Animalia
- Phylum: Echinodermata
- Class: Asteroidea
- Order: Brisingida
- Family: Brisingidae
- Genus: Brisinga (Asbjørnsen, 1856)

Genus of starfishes

Brisinga is a genus of starfish in the family Brisingidae. The species in this genus are primarily found in deep sea habitats.

== Species ==
- Brisinga Asbjørnsen, 1856
  - Brisinga alberti Fisher, 1907
  - Brisinga analoga (Fisher, 1919)
  - Brisinga andamanica Wood-Mason & Alcock, 1891
  - Brisinga bengalensis Wood-Mason & Alcock, 1891
  - Brisinga chathamica McKnight, 1973
  - Brisinga costata Verrill, 1884
  - Brisinga cricophora Sladen, 1889
  - Brisinga distincta Sladen, 1889
  - Brisinga endecacnemos Asbjørnsen, 1856
  - Brisinga eucoryne Fisher, 1916
  - Brisinga evermanni Fisher, 1906
  - Brisinga gunnii Alcock, 1893
  - Brisinga hirsuta Perrier, 1894
  - Brisinga insularum Wood-Mason & Alcock, 1891
  - Brisinga panopla Fisher, 1906
  - Brisinga parallela Koehler, 1909
  - Brisinga synaptoma (Fisher, 1917)
  - Brisinga tasmani H.E.S. Clark, 1970
  - Brisinga trachydisca Fisher, 1916
  - Brisinga variispina Ludwig, 1905
