= Neoferdina akala =

Scientific classification
- Kingdom: Animalia
- Phylum: Echinodermata
- Class: Asteroidea
- Order: Valvatida
- Family: Goniasteridae
- Subfamily: Ferdininae
- Genus: Neoferdina
- Species: N. akala

Binomial name
- Neoferdina akala Mah, 2026

Species of sea star

Neoferdina akala is a species of sea star in the family Goniasteridae found off New Caledonia.

== Etymology ==
The species epithet akala is derived from the Hawaiian word for "pink".

== Taxonomy and systematics ==
This species invites immediate comparison with Bathyferdina aireyae, with which it shares numerous quadrate-shaped bald spots on each of the superomarginal plates, but N. akala displays bald convex plates on the abactinal surface and lacks the glassine embedded granules present in Bathyferdina. It displays the bald plates that diagnose Neoferdina, and shows several convex plates separating it from Neoferdina insolita, which displays only flat abactinal plates. It is most similar to Neoferdina antigorum, with which it shares distinct bald patches on most superomarginal and inferomarginal plates, but differs in showing a full series of bald patches on both marginal series (especially on interradial plates where they are absent in N. antigorum), having fewer convex bare plates, differing in color, and being much less stellate. Neoferdina longibrachia is also more stellate and lacks the proximal bare patches on the marginal plates. Neoferdina akala is the third species known from New Caledonia and, at a depth of 230–249 m, is the deepest known species in the genus.

== Description ==
The species has a stout, stellate body with triangular, elongate arms and acute, curved interradial arcs. The body surface is covered by a granule-infused dermis extending over the marginal and actinal surfaces. Abactinal plates are convex, abutted, and extend along the arms to the distalmost point where 3 to 4 superomarginal plates are irregularly abutted. The surface has a continuous granule cover save for approximately 6 to 8 plates distally along the arms and 12 to 18 convex plates on the disk, which have distinct, centrally located bald spots. Superomarginal plates number 25 per interradius, and inferomarginal plates number 26 to 28. Both marginal series are covered by a continuous granule layer except for a central bald patch (quadrate on superomarginals, circular on inferomarginals) present on every plate. The actinal surface is covered by a continuous, granule-infused dermis obscuring plate boundaries. There is a single furrow spine per adambulacral plate, arranged in a linear series. No other adambulacral accessories are present. The disk is pink with dark pink to purple convex plates distally on the arms. Superomarginal plates have a dark red quadrate bald patch, and inferomarginals have a circular light pink bald patch.

== Distribution and habitat ==
This species is known from off New Caledonia at depths of 230 to 249 meters.
