= Madreporite =

Opening used to filter water in echinoderms

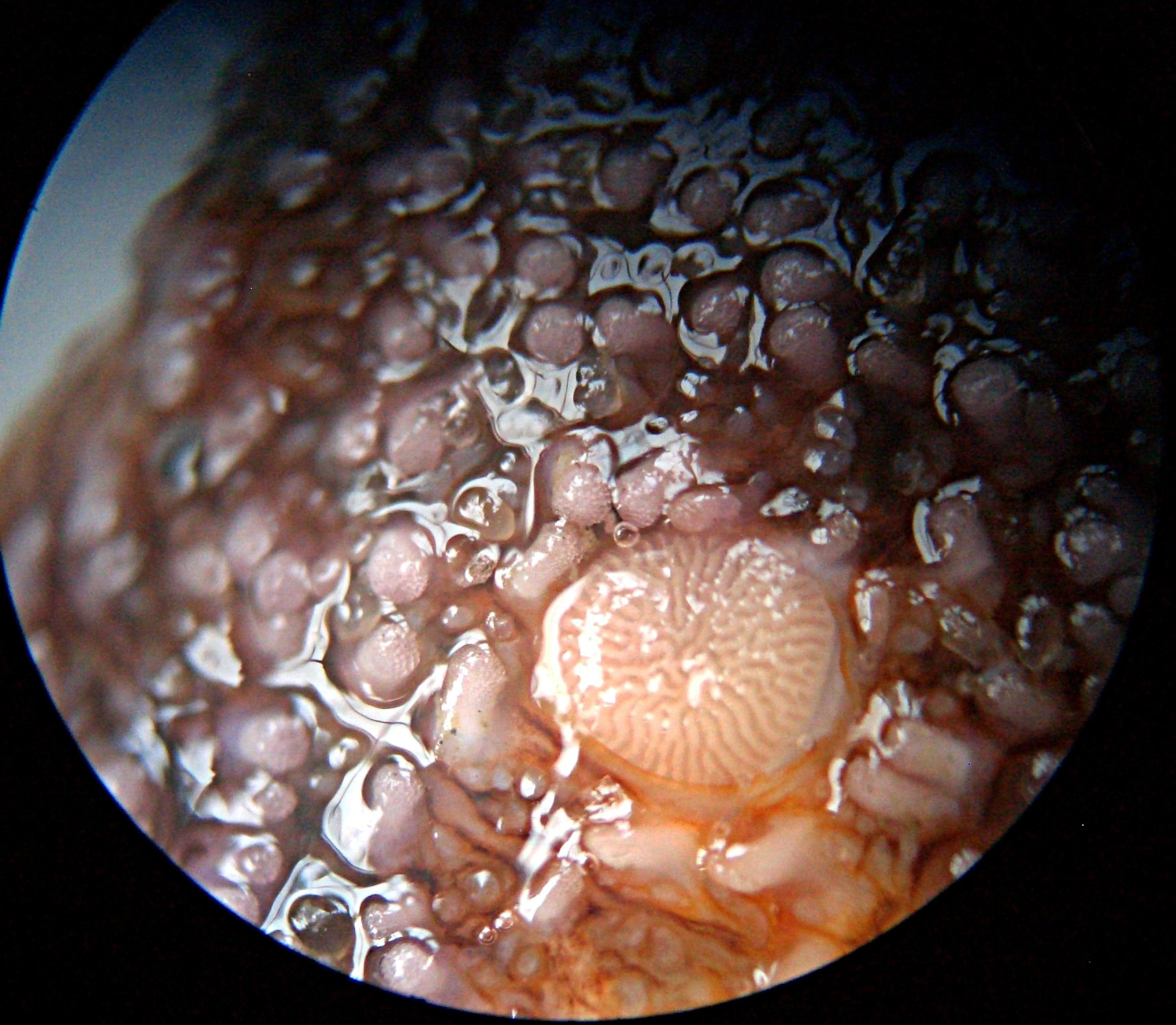
Close up of a madreporite

The madreporite /ˌmædrɪˈpɔːraɪt/ is a light colored calcareous opening used to filter water into the water vascular system of echinoderms. It acts like a pressure-equalizing valve. It is visible as a small red or yellow button-like structure, looking like a small wart, on the aboral surface of the central disk of a sea star or sea urchin or the oral surface of Ophiuroidea. Close up, it is visibly structured, resembling a "madrepore" (stone coral, Scleractinia) colony. From this, it derives its name.

The water vascular system of the sea star consists of a series of seawater-filled ducts that function in locomotion and feeding and respiration. Its main parts are the madreporite, the stone canal, the ring canal, the radial canals, the lateral canals, and the tube feet. The sieve-like madreporite allows entry of seawater into the stone canal, which connects to the ring canal around the mouth. Five or more radial canals extend from the ring canal, one in each arm above the ambulacral groove. From the radial canals extend many lateral canals, each of which leads to a tube foot. Each tube foot is a closed cylinder with muscular walls, having a sucker at the outer end and a bulb-like ampulla at its inner end within the body cavity. The madreporite's function in maintaining fluid has been experimentally tested on Pisaster ochraceus, wherein sea stars with blocked madreporites were unable to readjust their body volume after exposure to hyperosmotic conditions. Experimental blocking of the madreporite of the sea urchin Strongylocentrotus droebachiensis caused the similar result of weight loss in the sea urchins, although the madreporite has significantly less of an impact on fluid regulation in sea urchins than sea stars.

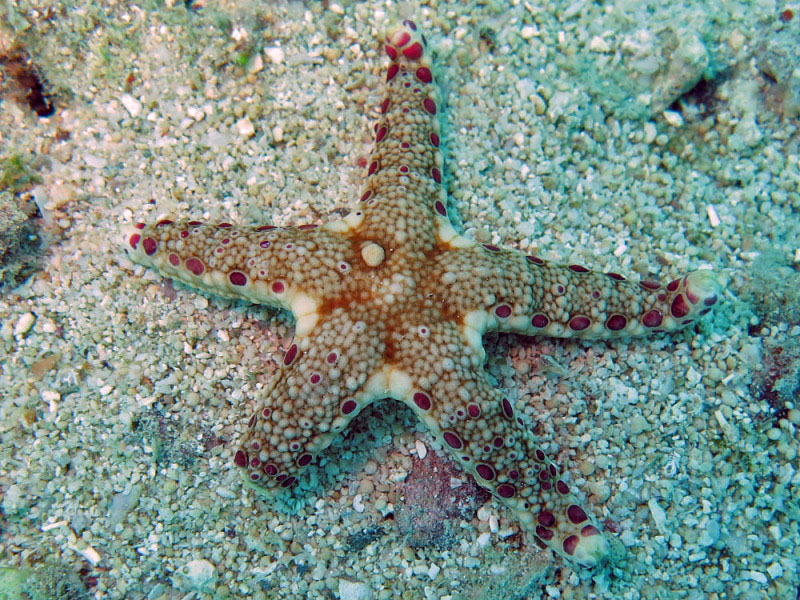
On Neoferdina cumingi (grey plate).

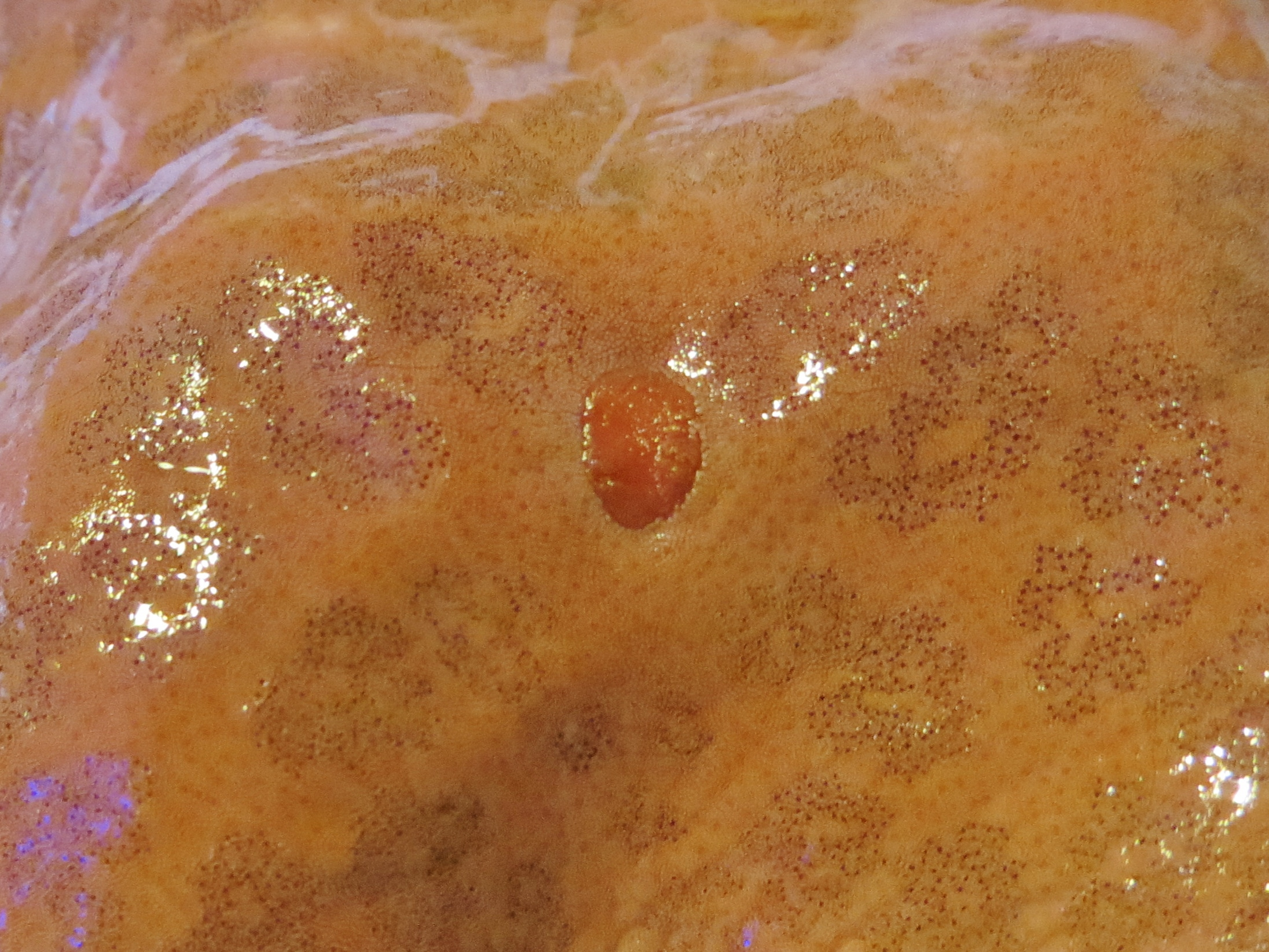
On Choriaster granulatus.

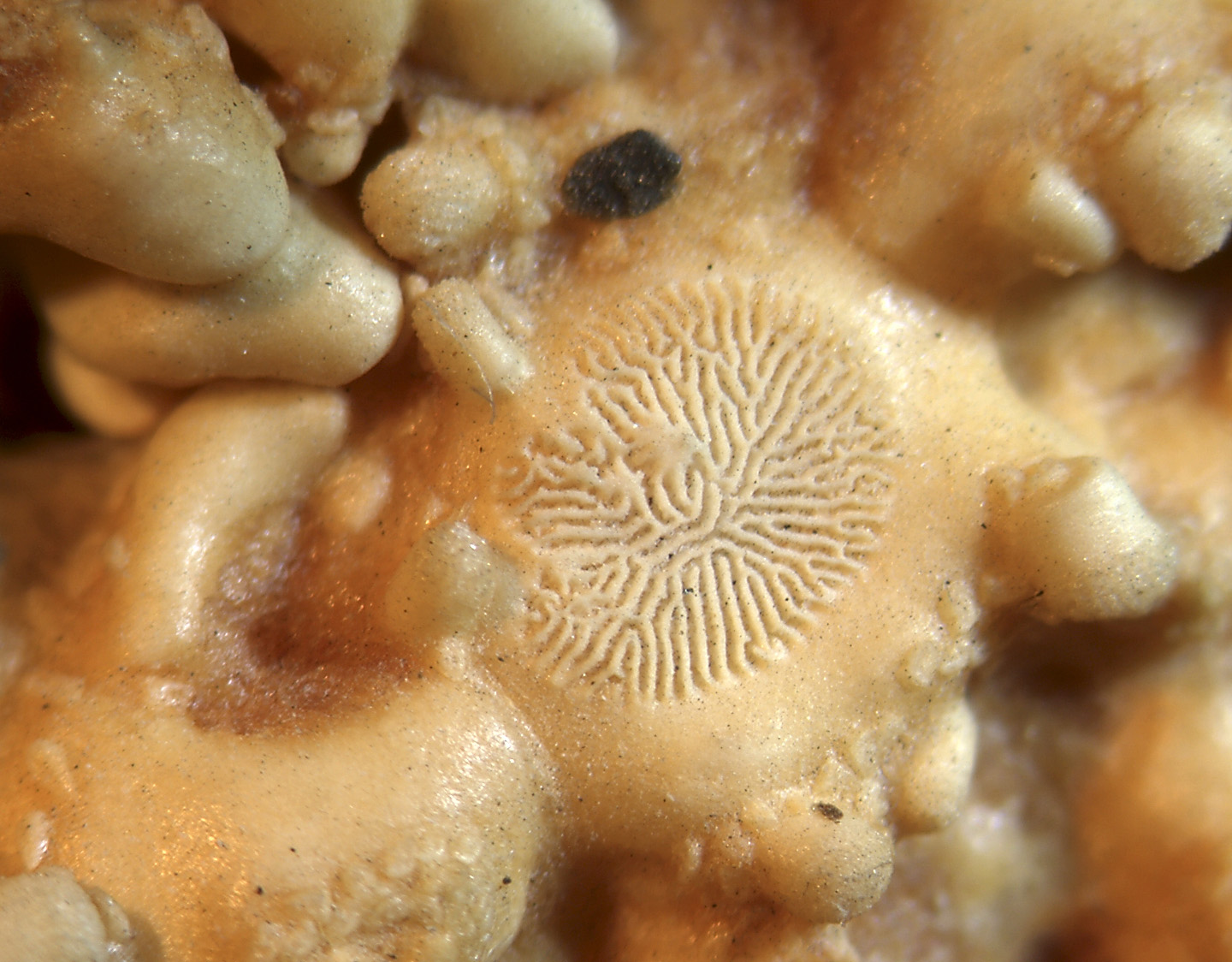
Close-up.

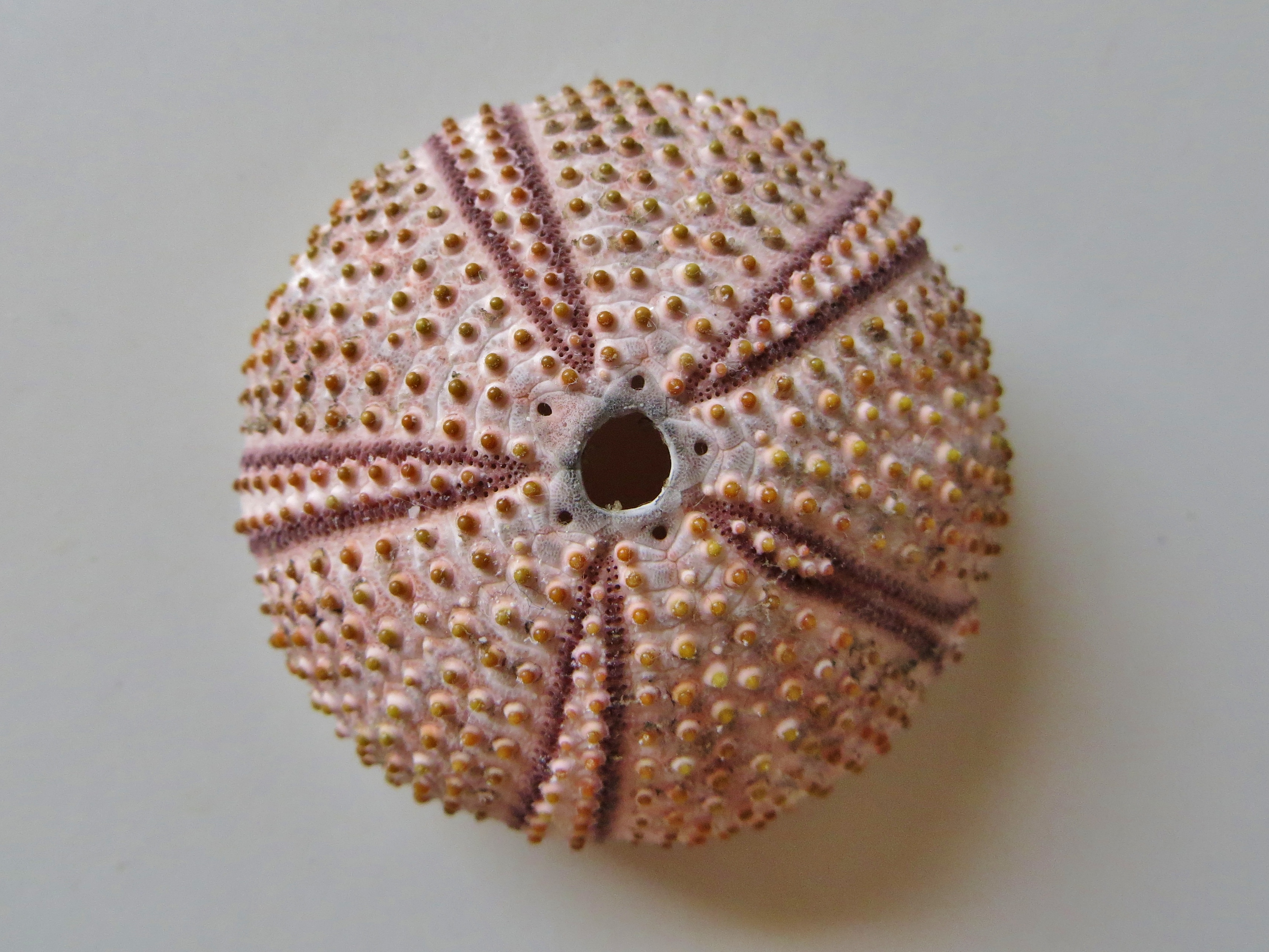
Top left ocular plate on this Arbacia lixula.

Asterias diagram: 1 Pyloric stomach; 2 Intestine; 3 Rectal gland; 4 Stone canal; 5 Madreporite; 6 Pyloric duct; 7 Pyloric cecum; 8 Cardiac stomach; 9 Gonad; 10 Ambulacral plates; 11 Ampullae
