= Maureen Downey =

American zoologist

- Born: May 1, 1921; Washington, D.C., U.S.
- Died: May 14, 2000 (aged 79); San Juan Island, Washington, U.S.
- Education: George Washington University; Duke University; University of Washington
- Known for: Authority on sea stars and echinoderms Discovered Midgardia xandaros (the world's largest starfish)
- Scientific career
- Fields: Invertebrate zoology
- Workplaces: National Museum of Natural History, U.S. Fish and Wildlife Service, Central Intelligence Agency, Duke University Marine Laboratory

Maureen Elizabeth Downey (May 1, 1921 – May 14, 2000) was an American zoologist who worked for three decades at the Smithsonian National Museum of Natural History. Known as "The Starfish Lady," she was an authority on sea stars and other echinoderms, co-founding the International Echinoderm Conference in 1972. Among her discoveries is Midgardia xandaros, the world's largest starfish.

== Early life and education ==
Maureen Downey was born in Washington, D.C., in 1921. She had an early fascination with animal biology, bringing insect specimens to be identified at the National Museum of Natural History.

She studied at George Washington University, then Duke University and the University of Washington's Friday Harbor Laboratories.

== Career ==
Downey was an international authority on echinoderms, particularly sea stars, earning her the nickname "The Starfish Lady." While she occasionally studied other groups, such as brittle stars, her work primarily focused on sea stars. Her work with echinoderms began in the 1940s, when she worked briefly at the Duke University Marine Laboratory in North Carolina.

She began her career in Washington, D.C., serving as a civil servant at the Central Intelligence Agency and later at the United States Fish and Wildlife Service. In 1957, she joined the Smithsonian's National Museum of Natural History as a secretary. Over time, she transitioned to a museum technician role, focusing on echinoderms. Her dedication and expertise led to a promotion to museum specialist, where she conducted research on starfish and improved the accessibility of the museum's echinoderm collection. She also authored two comprehensive catalogs, covering echinoids and ophiuroids found in major collections throughout North America, during her 30-year tenure at the museum.

In 1967, she co-founded the Echinoderm Newsletter, and in 1972 she co-organized the first International Echinoderm Conference at the National Museum of Natural History. Downey discovered several new species of sea stars, notably the deep-water Midgardia xandaros, which was confirmed as the world's biggest starfish. In 1992, she published the book Starfishes of the Atlantic. Co-written with Ailsa McGown Clark, it became a classic of the field.

She retired in 1987 to San Juan Island, where she lived until her death in 2000 at age 79.

== Publications ==
- 1967 - Astronebris tatafilius (Euryalae: Asteronychidae), a new genus and species of Ophiuroid from the Aleutians, with a revised key to the family Asteronychidae. Proceedings of The Biological Society of Washington 80: 41–45. BHL
- 1968 - A note on the Atlantic species of the starfish genus Linckia. Proceedings of the Biological Society of Washington 81: 41–44. BHL
- 1968 - Catalog of recent Echinoid type specimens in the U.S. National Museum Smithsonian Institution and the Museum of Comparative Zoology Harvard University. Bulletin of the United States National Museum 264: 1-99. BHL
- 1969 - Catalog of recent Ophiuroid type specimens in major collections in the United States. Bulletin of the United States National Museum 293: 1–239. BHL
- 1970 - Zorocallida, New Order, and Doraster constellatus, New Genus and Species, with Notes on the Zoroasteridae (Echinodermata; Asteroidea). Smithsonian contributions to Zoology 64: 1–18. SI-repository
- 1970 - Drachmaster bullisi new genus and species of Ophidiasteridae (Echinodermata, Asteroidea), with a key to the Caribbean species of the family. Proceedings of the Biological Society of Washington 83(6): 77–82. BHL
- 1970 - Marsipaster acicula, new species (Asteroidea: Echinodermata), from the Caribbean and Gulf of Mexico. Proceedings of the Biological Society of Washington 83(28): 309–312. BHL
- 1971 - A new species of the genus Solaster (Echinodermata: Asteroidea). Proceedings of the Biological Society of Washington 84(4): 39–42. BHL
- 1971 - Two new species of the genus Tamaria (Echinodermata: Asteroidea) from the Tropical Western Atlantic. Proceedings of the Biological Society of Washington 84(5): 43–50. BHL
- 1971 - Ampheraster alaminos, a new species of the family Asteriidae (Echinodermata: Asteroidea) from the Gulf of Mexico. Proceedings of the Biological Society of Washington 84(6): 51–54. BHL
- 1972 - Midgardia xandaros new genus, new species, a large brisingid starfish from the Gulf of Mexico. Proceedings of the Biological Society of Washington 84(48): 421–426. BHL
- 1973 - Starfishes from the Caribbean and the Gulf of Mexico. Smithsonian contributions to Zoology 126: 1–158. SI-repository
- 1975 - Asteroidea from Malpelo Island with a description of a new species of the genus Tamaria. in: Graham, J.B.. The biological investigation of Malpelo Island, Colombia. Smithsonian contributions to Zoology 176: 86–90. SI-repository
- 1977 - with Enrico Tortonese. On the genera Echinaster Mueller and Troschel, and Othilia Gray, and the validity of Verrillaster Downey. (Echinodermata: Asteroidea). Proceedings of the Biological Society of Washington 90(4): 829–830. BHL
- 1979 - Pythonaster pacificus n.sp. a new starfish of the family Myxasteridae (Echinodermata: Asteroidea). Proceedings of the Biological Society of Washington 92(1): 70–74. BHL
- 1979 - Hymenaster kieri, a new species of starfish of the family Pterasteridae (Echinodermata: Asteroidea). Proceedings of the Biological Society of Washington 92(4): 801–803. BHL
- 1980 - Floriaster maya, new genus and species of the family Goniasteridae. Proceedings of the Biological Society of Washington 93(2): 346–349. BHL
- 1981 - A new goniasterid seastar, Evoplosoma scorpio (Echinodermata: Asteroidea), from the northeastern Atlantic. Proceedings of the Biological Society of Washington 94(2): 561–563. BHL
- 1982 - Evoplosoma virgo, a new goniasterid starfish (Echinodermata: Asteroidea) from the Gulf of Mexico. Proceedings of the Biological Society of Washington 95(4): 772–773. BHL
- 1986 - Revision of the Atlantic Brisingida (Echinodermata: Asteroidea), with description of a new genus and family. Smithsonian contributions to Zoology 435: 1-57. SI-repository
- 1992 - with Ailsa McGown Clark. Starfishes of the Atlantic.

== External linkst ==
- Works by Maureen Downey at the Biodiversity Heritage Library
