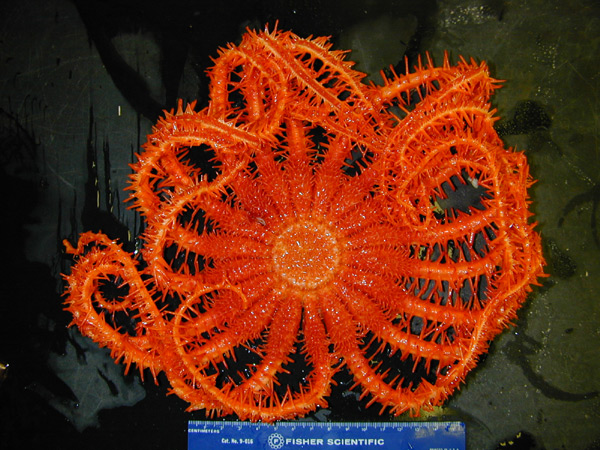
- Brisingid sea star

Scientific classification
- Kingdom: Animalia
- Phylum: Echinodermata
- Class: Asteroidea
- Superorder: Forcipulatacea
- Order: Brisingida; Fisher, 1928

Families
- See text.

= Brisingida =

Order of starfishes

The Brisingids are deep-sea-dwelling starfish in the order Brisingida.

== Description ==
These starfish have between 6 and 16 long, attenuated arms which they use for suspension feeding. Other characteristics include a single series of marginals, a fused ring of disc plates, the lack of actinal plates, a spool-like ambulacral column, reduced abactinal plates, and crossed pedicellariae. They are 40 times the size of disk radius and have 7–20 flexible spiny arms.

== Distribution ==
Brisingida occur in a number of deep-sea locations, particularly in the Caribbean and New Zealand.

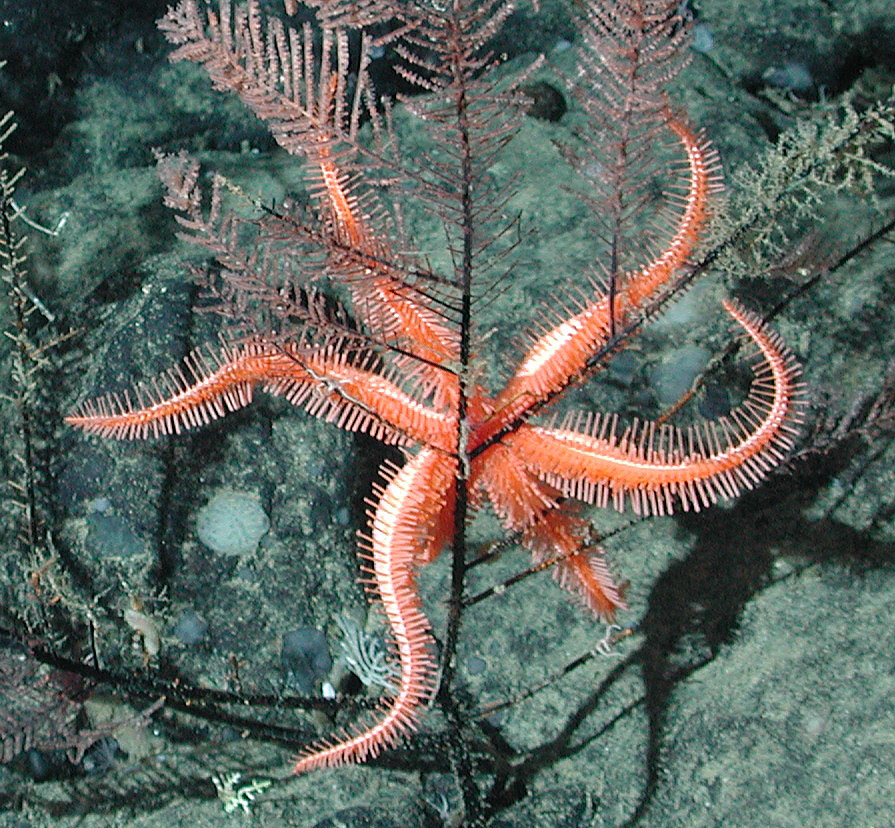
An orange brisingid on black coral at 1,950 m in California, Davidson Seamount

This type of species are found of varying size especially in the eastern Pacific Ocean at a depth of 1,820–2,418 m.

== Taxonomy ==
The Brisingida contain two families, with 18 genera:

- Family Brisingidae, G.O. Sars, 1875
  - Genus Astrolirus, Fisher, 1917 — (two species)
  - Genus Astrostephane, Fisher, 1917 — (two species)
  - Genus Brisinga Asbjørnsen, 1856 (synonym: Craterobrisinga, Fisher, 1916) — (20 species)
  - Genus Brisingaster Loriol, 1883 — (monotypic)
  - Genus Brisingella Fisher, 1917 — (monotypic)
  - Genus Brisingenes Fisher, 1917 — (four species)
  - Genus Hymenodiscus Perrier, 1884 — (16 species)
  - Genus Midgardia Downey, 1972 — (monotypic)
  - Genus Novodinia Dartnall, Pawson, Pope & B.J. Smith, 1969 (synonym: Odinia, Perrier, 1885) — (13 species)
  - Genus Odinella Fisher, 1940 — (monotypic)
  - Genus Stegnobrisinga Fisher, 1916 — (three species)
- Family Freyellidae, Downey, 1986
  - Genus Astrocles Fisher, 1917 — (three species)
  - Genus Belgicella Ludwig, 1903 — (monotypic)
  - Genus Colpaster Sladen, 1889 — (two species)
  - Genus Freyastera Downey, 1986 — (six species)
  - Genus Freyella Perrier, 1885 (synonym: Freyellidea, Fisher, 1917) — (31 species)
  - Genus Freyellaster Fisher 1918 — (five species)
