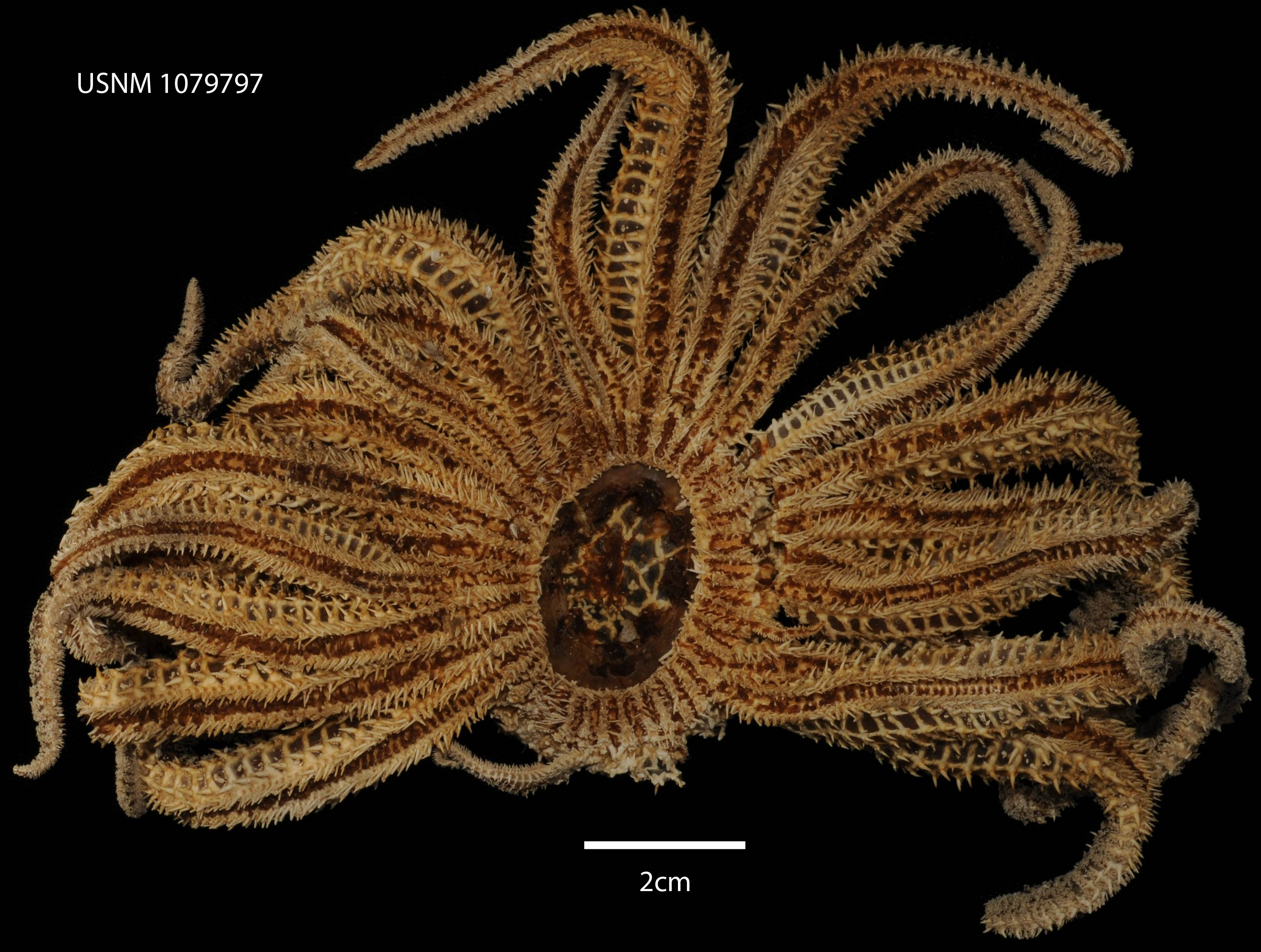
- Preserved specimen

Scientific classification
- Kingdom: Animalia
- Phylum: Echinodermata
- Class: Asteroidea
- Order: Forcipulatida
- Family: Heliasteridae
- Genus: Labidiaster
- Species: L. radiosus

Binomial name
- Labidiaster radiosus Lütken, C. (1871)

Synonyms
- Labidiaster crassus Koehler, 1923

= Labidiaster radiosus =

Species of starfish

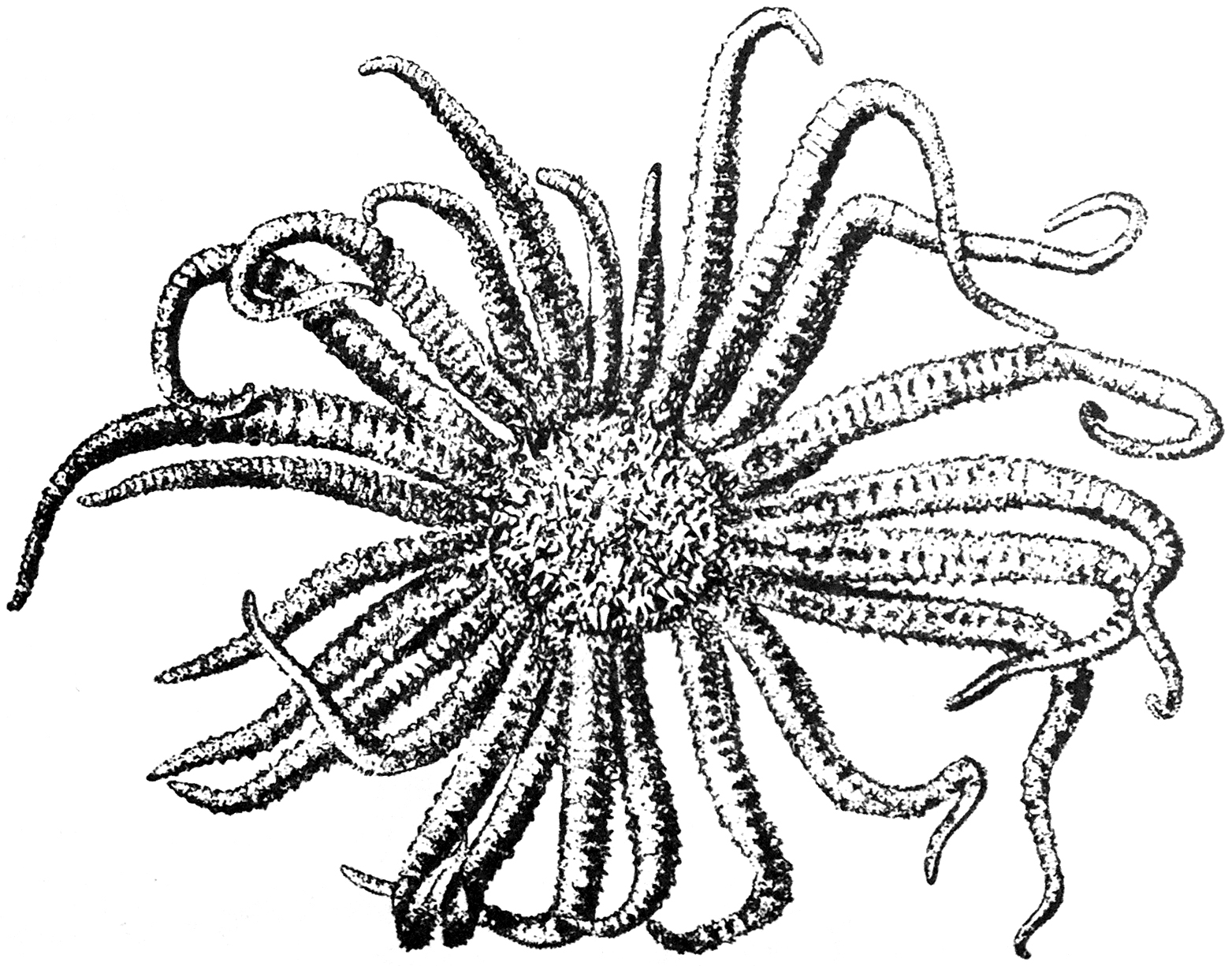
Labidiaster radiosus, Otto's Encyclopedia (1897)

Labidiaster radiosus, the fragile sticky ray star, is a large species of starfish in the family Heliasteridae and was first described by Lütken in 1871. It is found in the waters of southern South America to Sub-Antarctica and the Antarctic Peninsula.

== Description ==
Labidiaster radiosus is a large starfish that can reach up to 40 cm (16 in) across, its color is variable in life, ranging from red-orange to purple and white. It has a round abdomen with 20-40 arms, often has a pattern of concentric circles radiating out on arms. Labidiaster radiosus may be confused with Labidiaster annulatus and the two have even been considered to be the same species. However, they can be distinguished by closely examining the pedicellaria in the central disc.

== Distribution ==
Labidiaster radiosus is found on rocky reefs in the waters of southern South America to Sub-Antarctica and the Antarctic Peninsula. it lives at depths of 5-450m with a sea temperature range of 1.7 °C (35 °F)-11.2 °C (52 °F).

== Reproduction ==
Embryos will hatch into planktonic larvae which later metamorphose into pentamerous juveniles. These develop into young sea stars with short, stubby arms.
