= Ian Hewson =

American oceanographer and academic

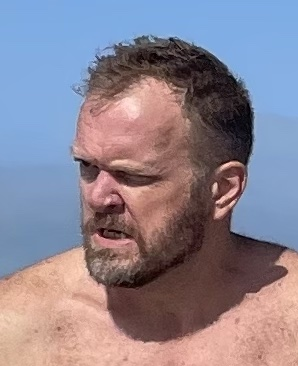
- Born: Singapore
- Education: Canberra Grammar School; University of Queensland; University of Southern California
- Scientific career
- Workplaces: University of California, Santa Cruz; Cornell University
- Thesis: Virus impacts upon marine bacterial and diazotroph assemblage composition (2005)

Ian Hewson (1977/1978) is an Australian American biological oceanographer and marine ecologist who is a professor of microbiology at Cornell University. He leads the Cornell Marine Mass Mortality Laboratory, where he studies the drivers of marine mass mortalities.

== Early life and education ==
Hewson went to high school at Canberra Grammar School. He was an undergraduate student at the University of Queensland, where he studied botany and marine science. His honours research considered benthic microalgae. He moved to the University of Southern California for his doctoral research in oceanography, where he worked on marine environmental biology. His doctoral research explored the impact of viruses on the composition of bacterial communities. During his PhD, he mapped the biogeography of taxa around the ocean. He then moved to the University of California, Santa Cruz to work on nitrogen fixing marine bacteria.

== Research and career ==
In 2009, Hewson joined the Department of Microbiology at Cornell University. He has focused on aquatic virology, and how viruses influence keystone taxa. His research makes use of field surveys, laboratory analysis and computational simulation to understand marine mass mortalities.

Hewson has studied single-stranded DNA viruses and looked to understand their role in disease. He has studied sea star wasting disease (SSWD), a condition that impacted starfish from Alaska to Baja California. He looked to understand how viral infection impacts the microbiome of sea stars, and how sea star-associated densovirus (SSaDV) caused SSWD symptoms. He found that SSadV did not always correlate with SSWD, and that the wasting would be better known as Asteroid Idiopathic Wasting Syndrome. He explained that warmer oceans result in the production of excess organic material, which allows bacteria to thrive. This depletes the levels of oxygen available for starfish, which results in puffiness and discolouration.

In 2022, Hewson started studying why sea urchins in the Caribbean were becoming unwell. He took samples from healthy and unhealthy sea urchins, and showed that the sick sea urchins had traces of the parasite Philaster apodigitiformis.

== Selected publications ==
- Breitbart, Mya; Hewson, Ian; Ben Felts; Joseph M Mahaffy; James Nulton; Peter Salamon; Rohwer, Forest Lamont (2003). "Metagenomic analyses of an uncultured viral community from human feces". Journal of Bacteriology. 185 (20): 6220–6223. doi:10.1128/jb.185.20.6220-6223.2003. PMC 225035. PMID 14526037. Wikidata Q33193633.
- Fuhrman, Jed Alan; Steele, Joshua; Hewson, Ian; Michael S Schwalbach; Mark V Brown; Green, Jessica; Brown, James (2008). "A latitudinal diversity gradient in planktonic marine bacteria". Proceedings of the National Academy of Sciences of the United States of America. 105 (22): 7774–7778. Bibcode:2008PNAS..105.7774F. doi:10.1073/pnas.0803070105. PMC 2409396. PMID 18509059. Wikidata Q30482177.
- Fuhrman, Jed Alan; Hewson, Ian; Michael S Schwalbach; Steele, Joshua; Mark V Brown; Shahid Naeem (2006). "Annually reoccurring bacterial communities are predictable from ocean conditions". Proceedings of the National Academy of Sciences of the United States of America. 103 (35): 13104–13109. Bibcode:2006PNAS..10313104F. doi:10.1073/pnas.0602399103. PMC 1559760. PMID 16938845. Wikidata Q33255661.

== Personal life ==
Hewson is gay and a member of 500 Queer Scientists. He plays ice hockey and competed in the 2017 Madison Gay Hockey Association tournament. He is an avid swimmer and plays water polo.
