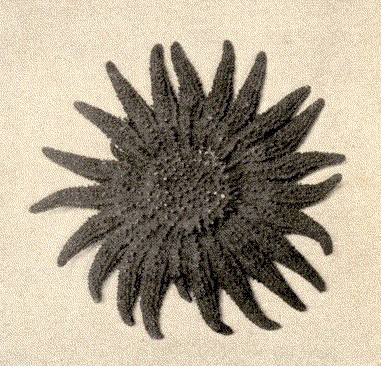

Scientific classification
- Kingdom: Animalia
- Phylum: Echinodermata
- Class: Asteroidea
- Order: Forcipulatida
- Family: Heliasteridae
- Genus: Heliaster
- Species: H. solaris

Binomial name
- Heliaster solaris A.H. Clark, 1920

= Heliaster solaris =

Species of echinoderm

Heliaster solaris commonly known as 24-rayed sunstar is a possibly extinct sea star which was known from the waters near Española Island in the Galápagos Islands. The species was endemic to the Galápagos Island group, where it appears to have been strictly restricted to the waters around Española Island.

== Description ==
The body of Heliaster solaris grew up to 3 inches in diameter, and had 22 to 24 cylindrical and elongated more or less distinctly banded rays which were tapering at the ends. They were one third longer than the diameter of the body. The dorsal rows of the spines were longer and more compressed. The spines, pedicellariae, and the madreporic plate were light yellowish. It hasn’t been seen in the wild since 1983. Heliaster solaris is poorly-understood and rarely documented species of sea star. The 24-rayed sunstar may be synonymous with another species in the Heliaster species complex that lives in the east Pacific.

== Taxonomy ==
This species was first mentioned by John Edward Gray in 1840 in the Annals and Magazine of Natural History as Asterias multiradiata and later as Heliaster multiradiatus, after the holotype specimen was found in San Cristóbal Island in the early 1830s. Due to the fact that Carl Linnaeus used the name Asterias multiradiata (current accepted name: Capillaster multiradiata) already in 1758 Gray's name became an invalid homonym. In 1920 Austin Hobart Clark published the replacement name Heliaster solaris.

== Hunting ==
Heliaster solaris hunted benthic invertebrates, including sea anemones, mollusks, and other echinoderms, through olfactory and tactile cues sensed by their tubefeet.

== Possible extinction ==
In the early 1980s the Galápagos Islands were affected by the El Niño-Southern Oscillation event. The increase of the water temperatures led to the turning off of the plankton production and species like the 24-rayed Sunstar or Heliaster solaris could not be found again despite a 25-year survey. And combined with the effects of an increasingly heavy tourism industry in the islands at the time, appears to have led to the species' decline and possible extinction.
