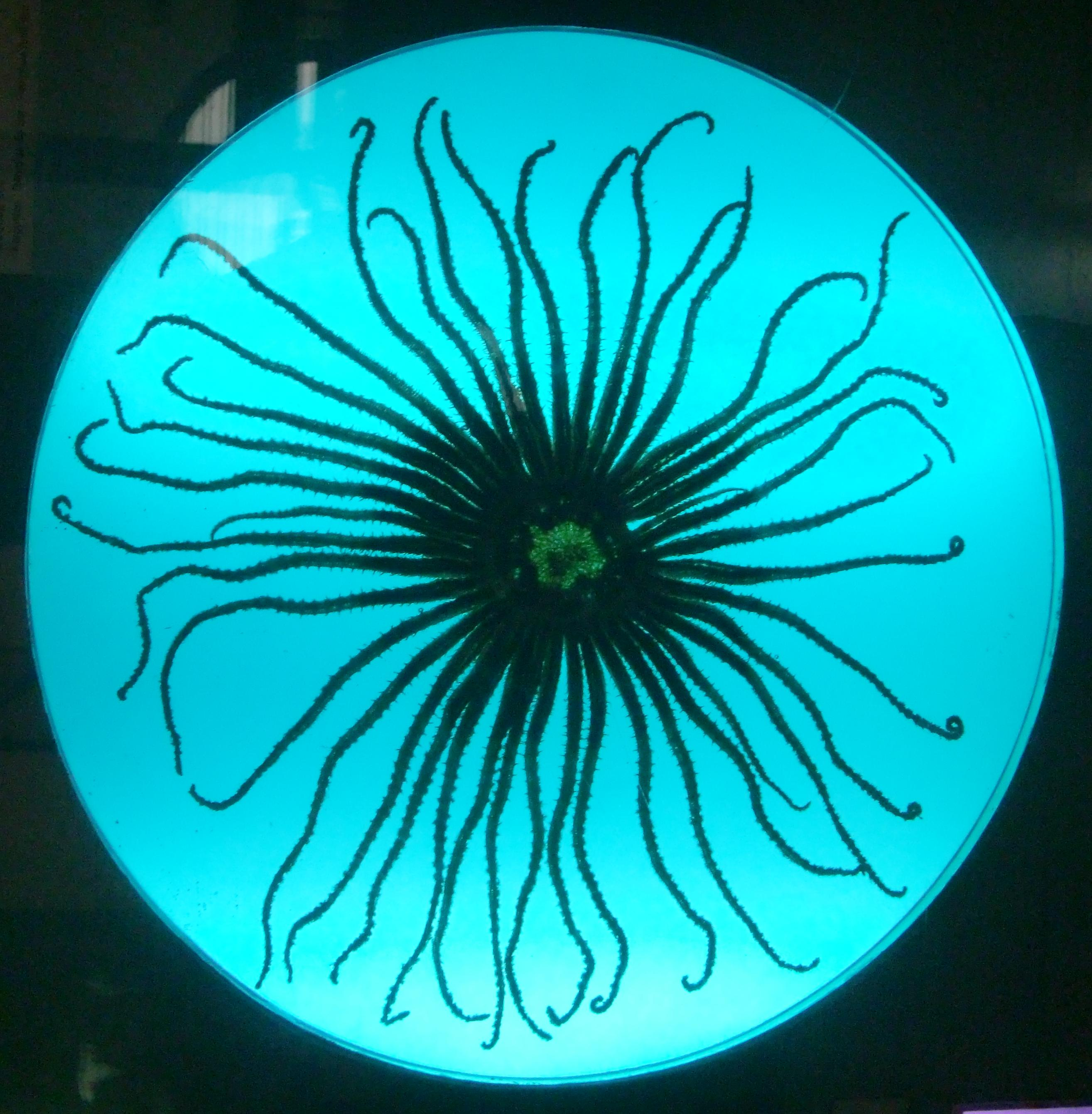
- Museum specimen

Scientific classification
- Kingdom: Animalia
- Phylum: Echinodermata
- Class: Asteroidea
- Order: Forcipulatida
- Family: Heliasteridae
- Genus: Labidiaster
- Species: L. annulatus

Binomial name
- Labidiaster annulatus Sladen, 1889

= Labidiaster annulatus =

Species of starfish

Labidiaster annulatus, the Antarctic sun starfish or wolftrap starfish is a species of starfish in the family Heliasteridae. It is found in the cold waters around Antarctica and has a large number of slender, flexible rays.

== Description ==
Labidiaster annulatus has a wide central disc and 40 to 45 long narrow rays and can reach a diameter of 60 centimetres (24 in). The disc is slightly inflated and is raised above the base of the rays. The madreporite is large and near the edge of the disc. The aboral or upper surface is covered in a meshed network of small slightly overlapping plates. These are covered by a membrane with numerous raised projections called papulae, some small spines and a few large triangular pedicellariae, wrench-like organs that can grasp objects. The rays are crowded together where they join the disc and their aboral surface is similarly clad in overlapping scales in a quadrangular mesh pattern. There are also short spines and many papulae and a number of small pedicellariae. At intervals down each ray there are transverse bands armed with numerous large pedicellariae. The oral or lower surface of the disc has a central mouth surrounded by further scales. The ambulacral grooves are wide and run down the centre of the oral side of each ray. There are widely separated narrow scales on either side of the grooves with two spines on each, one overlapping the groove and the other projecting from the side of the ray. There are rows of tube feet on either side of the groove, each foot having a button-like suction pad at the tip.

== Distribution and habitat ==
Labidiaster annulatus is found around the Antarctic Peninsula, South Georgia and the South Sandwich Islands. The depth range is from the intertidal zone down to 554 metres (1,818 ft) but this starfish most commonly occurs between 30 and 400 metres (98 and 1,312 ft). It lives on the seabed and is found on sand, mud and gravel and among rocks.

== Feeding behaviour ==
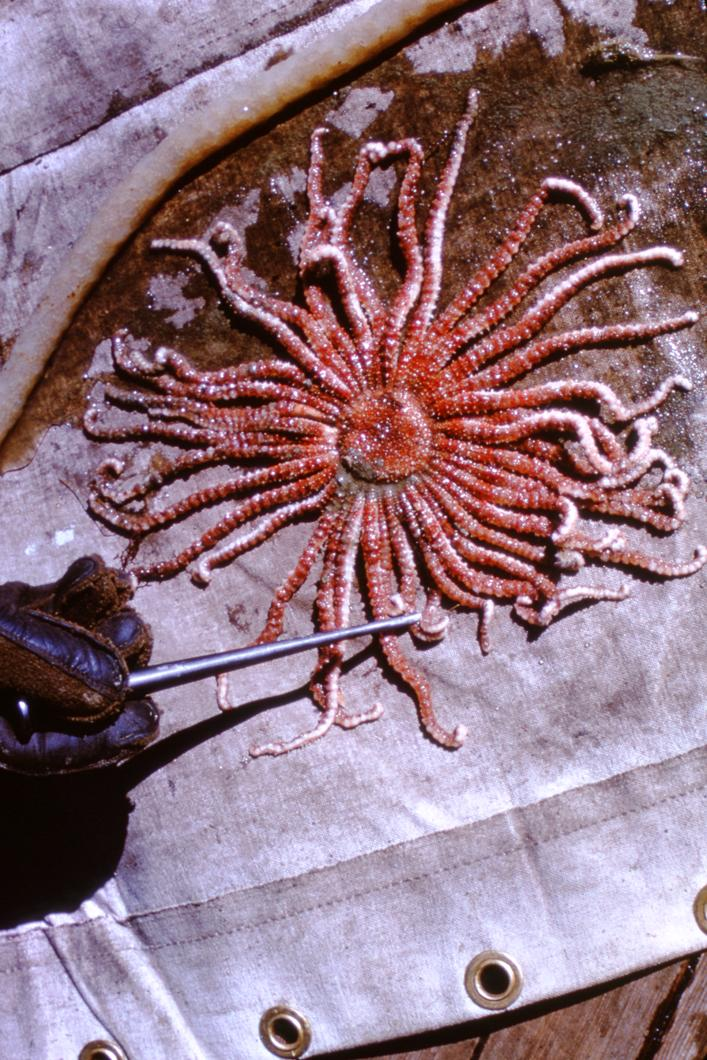
Labidiaster annulatus from the Antarctic Peninsula

Labidiaster annulatus is an opportunistic predator and scavenger. It moves about on the seabed using various combinations of rays. It often climbs to an elevated position on top of a rock or a large sponge. Here it holds on with some of its rays while it extends others like fishing rods. The rays are long and flexible and writhe about in search of prey. Invertebrates or even small fish that come in contact with the extended rays are grasped by the pedicellariae which snap shut. Other rays then curl around the struggling prey. It is manipulated to the underside of the rays where it is passed along by the tube feet to the mouth. This is extensible and can ingest large items. The prey continues to struggle while it is being transported and may escape. Analysis of stomach contents showed that krill and amphipods were the most frequent diet items. Sediment was also often present and may have contained microflora such as of foraminiferans. A portion of a fish measuring 6 centimetres (2.4 in) was found in one individual but it was unclear whether it had been caught alive or had been scavenged. Other dietary items were varied and included smaller starfish of this species and brittle stars such as Ophionotus victoriae.

== Reproduction ==
Little is known of the reproduction of Labidiaster annulatus, but the larvae pass through at least one bipinnaria and one brachiolaria stage as has been demonstrated by DNA analysis. The larvae are planktonic and spend many months drifting with the currents before settling on the seabed and undergoing metamorphosis into juveniles.
