= Zoroaster (echinoderm) =

Scientific classification
- Kingdom: Animalia
- Phylum: Echinodermata
- Class: Asteroidea
- Order: Forcipulatida
- Family: Zoroasteridae
- Genus: Zoroaster; Wyville Thomson, 1873

Type species
- Zoroaster fulgens Wyville Thomson, 1873

Genus of sea stars

Zoroaster is a genus of sea stars belonging to the family Zoroasteridae.

== Description ==
The species of this genus are found in the Atlantic Ocean, Pacific Ocean, etc.

== Species ==
These species belong to the genus Zoroaster:

- Zoroaster actinocles Fisher, 1919
- Zoroaster adami Koehler, 1909
- Zoroaster alfredi Alcock, 1893
- Zoroaster alternicanthus McKnight, 2006
- Zoroaster angulatus Alcock, 1893
- Zoroaster barathri Alcock, 1893
- Zoroaster carinatus Alcock, 1893
- Zoroaster fulgens Wyville Thomson, 1873
- Zoroaster hirsutus Ludwig, 1905
- Zoroaster macracantha H.L. Clark, 1916
- Zoroaster magnificus Ludwig, 1905
- Zoroaster microporus Fisher, 1916
- Zoroaster ophiactis Fisher, 1916
- Zoroaster ophiurus Fisher, 1905
- Zoroaster orientalis Hayashi, 1943
- Zoroaster planus Alcock, 1893
- Zoroaster singletoni McKnight, 2006
- Zoroaster spinulosus Fisher, 1906
- Zoroaster tenuis Sladen, 1889
- Zoroaster variacanthus McKnight, 2006
