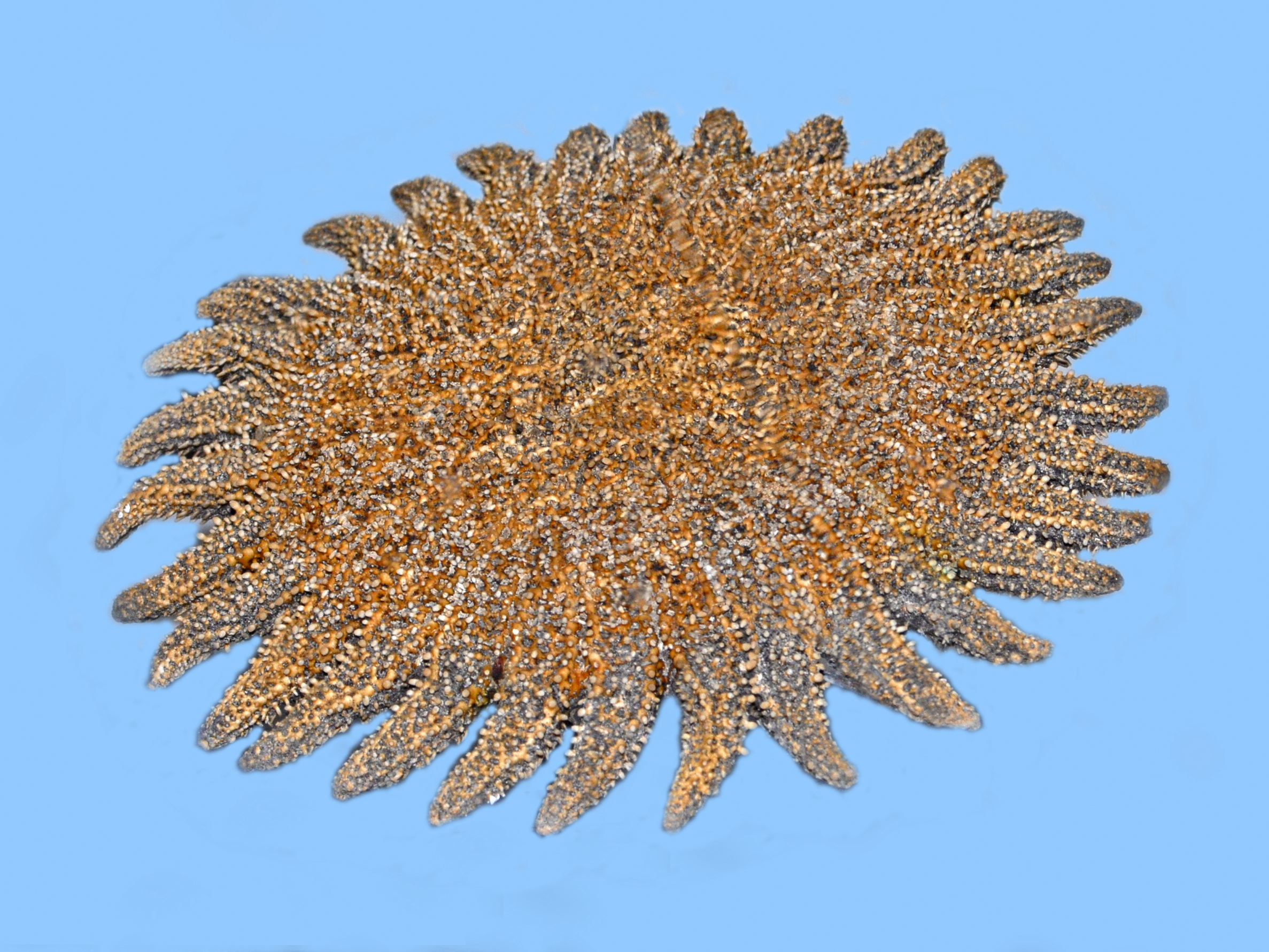
- Heliaster microbrachius

Scientific classification
- Kingdom: Animalia
- Phylum: Echinodermata
- Class: Asteroidea
- Order: Forcipulatida
- Family: Heliasteridae
- Genus: Heliaster; Gray, 1840

= Heliaster =

Heliaster Temporal range: 3–0 Ma Pliocene to present

Genus of starfishes

Heliaster is a genus of Asteroidea (sea stars) in the family Heliasteridae.

== Species ==
Image	Scientific name	Distribution
	Heliaster canopus Perrier, 1875	South Pacific Ocean
	Heliaster cumingi (Gray, 1840)	Gulf of California
	Heliaster helianthus (Lamarck, 1816)	southeastern Pacific Ocean
	Heliaster kubiniji Xantus, 1860	eastern Pacific Ocean
	Heliaster microbrachius Xantus, 1860	east Pacific
	Heliaster polybrachius H.L. Clark, 1907	Gulf of California
	Heliaster solaris A.H. Clark, 1920	Española Island in the Galápagos Islands.

== Fossil record ==
Whole specimens of Heliaster microbrachius have been found preserved in calcite-cemented quartz in Southwest Florida that dates to the Pliocene, 3.5 to 2.5 million years ago (Castilla et al. 2013). Today H. microbrachius is found only in the Pacific Ocean: on the coast of Panama, and Acapulco in Mexico. This suggests that greater connection between the two oceans gave the species a more extensive range in the past (Castilla et al. 2013).
