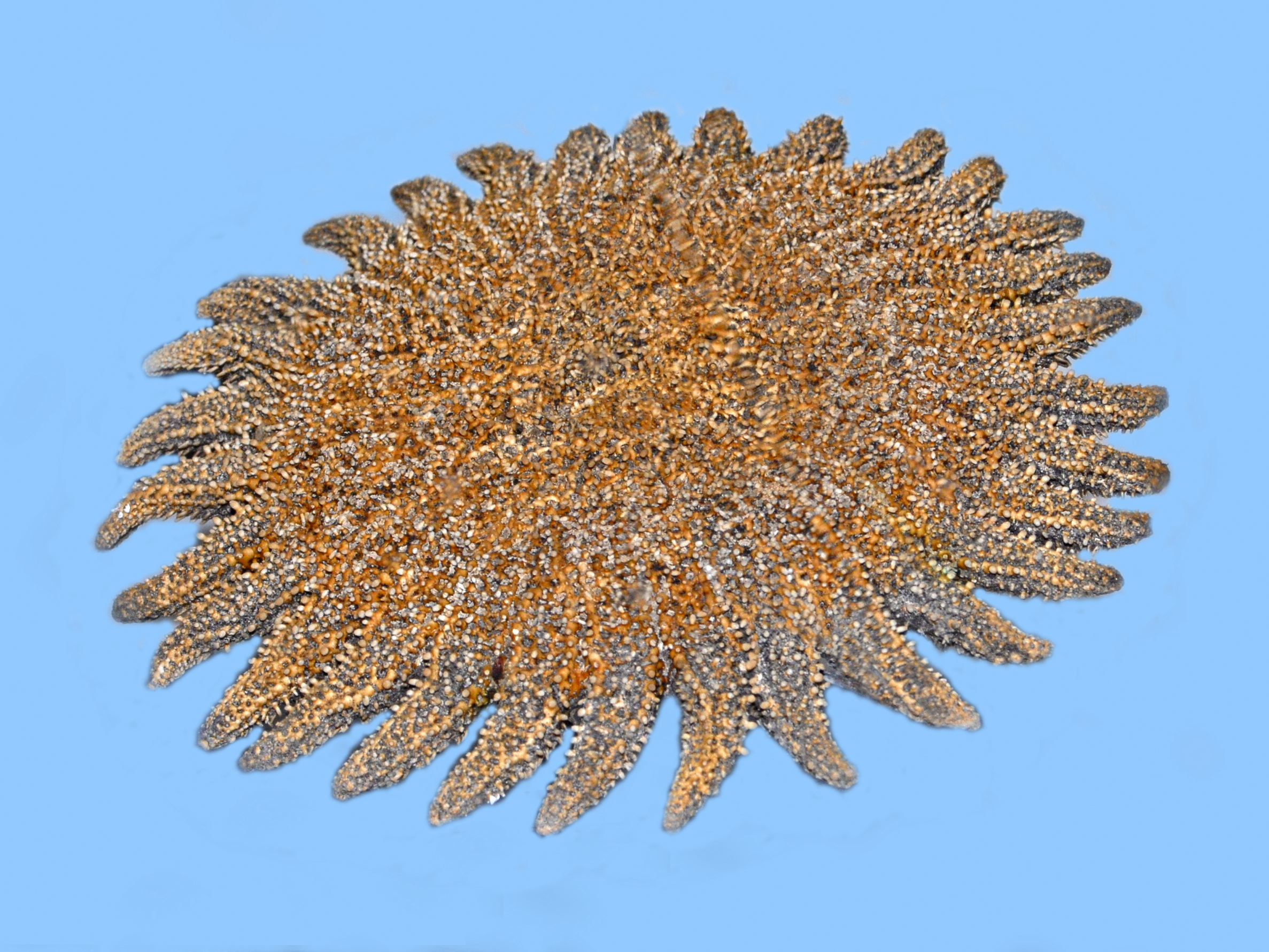

Scientific classification
- Kingdom: Animalia
- Phylum: Echinodermata
- Class: Asteroidea
- Order: Forcipulatida
- Family: Heliasteridae
- Genus: Heliaster
- Species: H. microbrachius

Binomial name
- Heliaster microbrachius Xantus, 1860

Synonyms
- Heliaster morrisoni A.H. Clark, 1949

= Heliaster microbrachius =

Species of starfish

Heliaster microbrachius is a species of Asteroidea (sea stars) in the family Heliasteridae.

== Description ==
Heliaster microbrachius can reach a diameter of 60–125 millimetres (2.4–4.9 in). The body consists of a disc with several rays. At the bottom of the body there is a mouth opening. These sea stars have a very large disc, somewhat elevated, with more or less flattened rays. Abactinal spines are very numerous, small, more or less cylindrical. Color of abactinal surface may be purplish or grayish-black, with deep yellow or whitish spines. The actinal surface is whitish, yellowish, or brownish, with pedicels much darker than spines. These sea stars can regenerate lost or damaged parts of their body. These multi-armed marine organisms are known for their autonomy, which refers to the process of losing limbs in response to harmful conditions, and their ability to regenerate such limbs. However, as a consequence of this autonomy and regeneration of body parts, the marine animals’ feeding rates decrease. Because their energy used for catching prey is allocated into their regeneration of arms, autonomy reduces the growth and reproduction of the Heliaster species.

== Distribution ==
This species is present in the east Pacific, along the west coast of South and Central America and Mexico.
