= Myxoderma =

Myxoderma may refer to:

- Myxoderma (echinoderm), a genus of sea stars in the family Zoroasteridae
- Myxoderma, a genus of fungi in the family Amanitaceae; synonym of Zhuliangomyces
- Myxoderma, a genus of bacteria; synonym of Nostochopsis
