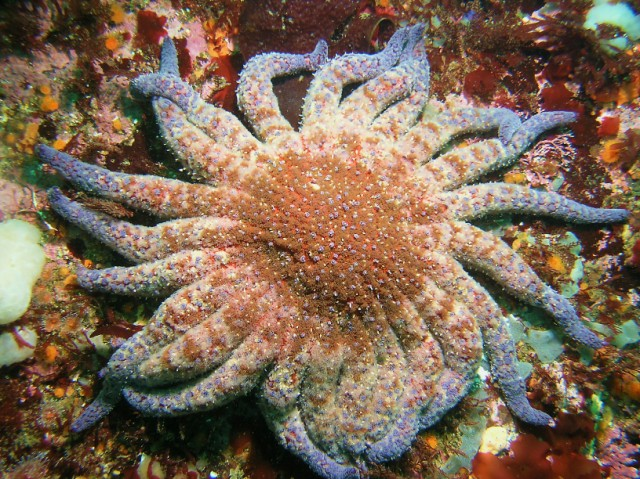

Scientific classification
- Kingdom: Animalia
- Phylum: Echinodermata
- Class: Asteroidea
- Order: Forcipulatida
- Family: Pycnopodiidae; Fisher, 1928

= Pycnopodiidae =

Family of starfishes

Pycnopodiidae is a family of echinoderms belonging to the order Forcipulatida.

Genera:

- Lysastrosoma Fisher, 1922
- Pycnopodia Stimpson, 1862
