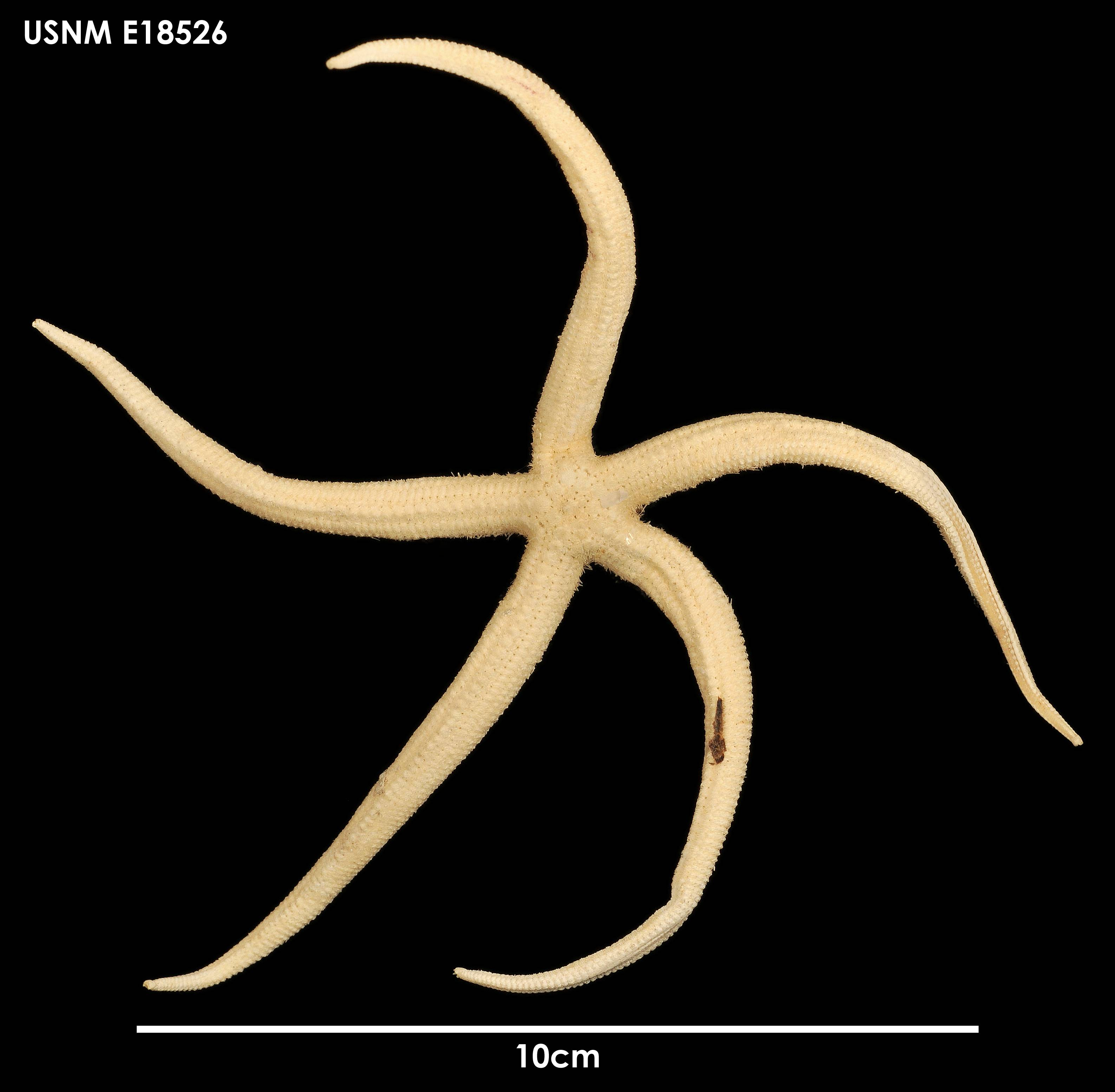

Scientific classification
- Kingdom: Animalia
- Phylum: Echinodermata
- Class: Asteroidea
- Order: Forcipulatida
- Family: Zoroasteridae
- Genus: Zoroaster
- Species: Z. fulgens

Binomial name
- Zoroaster fulgens Thomson, 1873

Synonyms
- List: Prognaster grimaldii Perrier, 1891; Prognaster longicauda Perrier, 1894; Zoroaster ackleyi Perrier, 1881; Zoroaster bispinosus Koehler, 1909; Zoroaster diomedeae Verrill, 1884; Zoroaster longicauda Perrier, 1885; Zoroaster trispinosus Koehler, 1896

= Zoroaster fulgens =

Species of starfish

Zoroaster fulgens is a species of starfish described in 1873 by Charles Wyville Thomson. It is found in the Atlantic Ocean.

Zoroaster fulgens is a marine “starfish” echinoderm belonging to the Asteroidea class, Forcipulatida order, Zoroasteridae family, and Zoroaster genus. Due to taxonomic disorganization Zoroaster fulgens is referred to by many other names including Z. longicauda, Z. ackleyi, Z. bispinosus, Z. diomedeae, Prognaster grimaldii, and Prognaster longicauda.

They were found and first described by Wyville Thomson in his book “The Depths of the Sea…” as he dredged the Atlantic in 1873 (Fig. 1).

== Physiology ==
Since Zoroaster fulgens is a starfish, it belongs in the phylum Echinodermata meaning they are deuterostomes. Another characteristic they share with their fellow Echinodermata is their internal mesodermal skeleton, which is made up of ossicles (Fig. 2), calcified structures that help with articulation (p. 922). Z. fulgens specifically have imbricate heavily armored skeletons (p. 177).

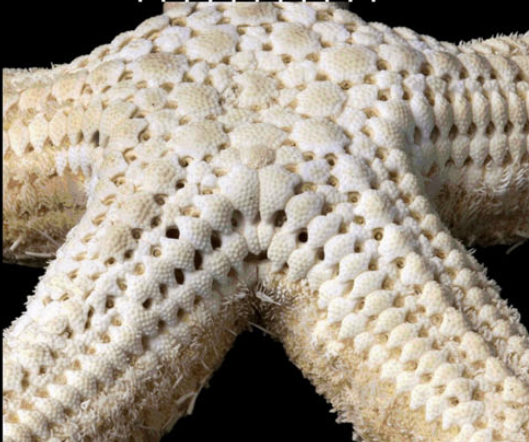
Figure. 2 Close up image of Zoroaster fulgens disc

In their research article, Fau and Villier (2018), describe many of the characteristics pertaining to Z. fulgens that make it unique. The Z. fulgens have five radial arms, a small disc, and a deeply sunken mouth. Closer to their mouth they have four rows of tube feet, but this can reduce to two rows distally. According to Fau and Villier (2018), the disc has ossicles arranged in a circle pattern. They have a central plate inside the circle of five radial and five interradial plates with a sharp edged madreporite inside a cavity formed by the interradial plates. The terminal plates are robust with straight proximal edges and convex distal edges. The wall of the arms is made up of different overlapping ossicles called the carinals, abactinals, marginals (only one row), actinals (several rows), adambulacral, and ambulacrals. These ossicles can have spines and facets to help with fitting against each other and protection. They have reduced superambulacrals. The oral spines have duck billed pedicellariae (grasping organs) and straight forcipulate pedicellariae. Their odontophore has fused doda and poda, they have large iioa, and their teeth are formed by galleried stereom.

== Sensory ==
While there is no research into the specific sensory features of the Z. fulgens, starfish are known to have a dispersed nervous system with a nerve ring around their mouth and radial nerves throughout the rest of their body/arms (p. 1082). They are all believed to process chemoreception and mechanoreception through their tube feet sensors which is also how they move along the sea floor (p. 1082). Some starfish have eyes on the ends of their arms meaning they can use photoreception, but as Z. fulgens lives in abyssal zones they might not possess such features or at least features similar to what has been described.

== Reproduction ==
It is believed that Z. fulgens are gonochoristic broadcast spawners with possible reproduction seasonality. They produce large lecithotrophic eggs that settle on the benthos to become tiny starfish juveniles. They have gonads at the base of each arm on the sides of their ambulacrum⎯radial band. Z. fulgens can also regenerate its arms if they are lost by repairing ossicles similarly to how they grew during development (p. 660).

== Development ==
Z. fulgens is a direct developer which means they have juvenile stages that looks like the adult starfish. However, these juveniles will have features that shift majorly during ontogeny which often leads to taxonomic disruptions inside Asteroidea (p. 644). The arms grow more in length than the disc in size during ontogeny resulting in the long arms and small disc that characterizes the Z. fulgens (p. 646). Some ossicles can fluctuate in number as the starfish grows while others are fixed, but either way the ossicles enlarge during development (p. 645).

== Ecology ==
=== Habitat ===
Z. fulgens inhabit the Atlantic, Pacific, and Indian ocean at bathyal to abyssal levels (200 to 6000 meters) which makes them deep-sea starfish (p. 177). They have been found in large densities at single stations which may be an indication of a more important ecological function that is presently unknown for this megafauna (p. 177).

=== Locomotion ===
The Z. fulgens like most starfish use their ventrally located disc-ending tube feet to move around the sea floor. These tube feet secrete chemicals that help it adhere to the substrate (p. 26). Their water vascular system helps move these feet by drawing in and expelling water throughout the body via the madreporite and canals (p. 197).

=== Feeding ===
The feeding mechanism of the Zoroaster genus as a whole is unknown. Using fatty acid biomarkers and stomach content analysis, Howell et al. (2003), discovered that Zoroaster fulgens biomarkers most resembled suspension feeder species meaning they mainly rely on a diet of photosynthetic microplankton. While their preferred prey is unknown their stomach content also included trace amounts of benthic echinoderms, crustaceans, and foraminiferans. The biomarkers indicated a reliance specifically on phytodetrital carbon which could make Z. fulgens predators of copepods which feed on phytodetrital food sources (p. 202). A further study on Z. fulgens labeled them as infaunal predators because the stomach analysis revealed Mollusca remains which makes them more of a general predator with a broader diet (p. 34). While they were lumped with the suspension feeders in two analyses performed by Howell et al. (2003), they also had significant differences in three biomarkers from the other suspension feeder species. Plus, their arm morphology doesn’t support suspension feeding as well as the other species. Other theories on how they feed include using pedicellaria, but Z. fulgens has straight pedicellaria not crossed as some species who use this method, and their mucus coating which could collect food from the water column (p. 203). Another idea is that Z. fulgens are scavengers as they’ve been observed at bathyal food falls (p. 181). The method of digestion for Zoroaster fulgens is extracorporeal (p. 194). Meaning they excrete their stomach over their prey to digest it before it enters the mouth and digestive system inside the starfish (p. 86).

=== Speciation ===
Upon genetic research into Zoroaster fulgens morphology, three distinct morphotypes are found with differing depth ranges in the Atlantic ocean.

The robust-armed: 925-1750m

The slender-armed: 1,300-2,200m

The long-armed: below 3,300m

The data analysis done by Howell et al. (2004), suggests that these three morphotypes are reproductively isolated. The slender and long arm being more closely related to one another and possibly in the process of speciation, and the robust-armed is already a distinctly different species. The speciation is theorized to be due to physical barriers such as depth and continental slope as well as historical events including past climate changes. Moreover, the diet differences between Northeast and Northwest Atlantic Z. fulgens may be further evidence of Z. fulgens harboring cryptic species (p. 34).

== Evolution ==
The Zoroasteridae has been supported as monophyletic over numerous analyses of different researchers (p. 652). Inside this family, the Z. fulgens is not only the earliest/most basal Forcipulatida but is also the most basal in the Zoroaster genus (p. 184). The reason for this basal placement is their similar morphology to the Paleozoic asteroida and their single marginal plates which link them to Jurassic asteroids (p. 199; p. 656).

=== Fossils ===
In Seymour Island, Antarctica a Z. fulgens Eocene fossil was discovered, however, upon closer examination this fossil has revealed characteristics not completely identical to the extant Z. fulgens. This could be due to the extinct Z. fulgens living in shallow-water environments opposed to deep water environments of the species today which means the Z. fulgens could’ve migrated and adapted during the climate change of the Oligocene-Miocene or that the two are distinctly different species (p. 315). The extant Z. fulgens developed more elongated terminal plates with less prominent notches, two primary spines, and three secondary spines by each carinate adambulacral (p. 310). The extinct fossil shares similarities with the robust morphotype signaling that it could be a distinct species (p. 312).

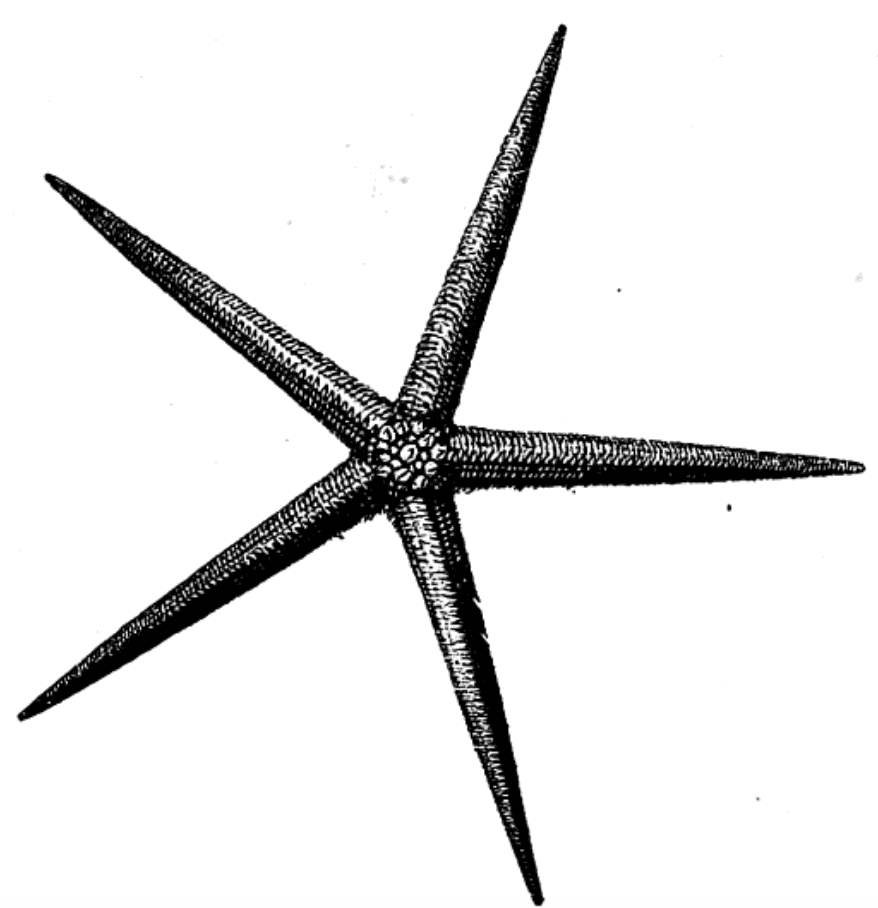
Figure 1. Drawing of Zoroaster fulgens by C. W. Thomson
