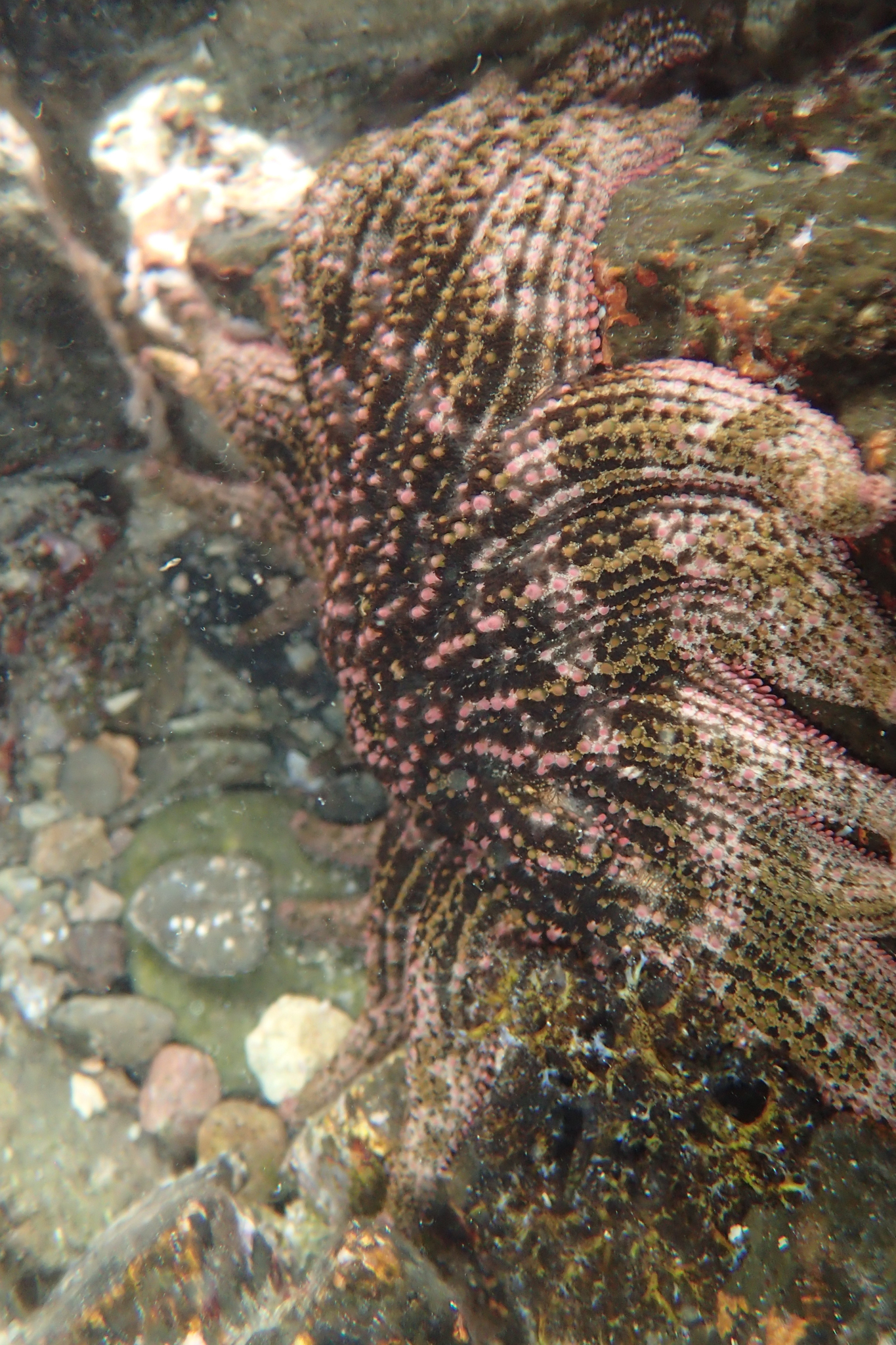

Scientific classification
- Kingdom: Animalia
- Phylum: Echinodermata
- Class: Asteroidea
- Order: Forcipulatida
- Family: Heliasteridae
- Genus: Heliaster
- Species: H. kubiniji

Binomial name
- Heliaster kubiniji Xantus, 1860

= Heliaster kubiniji =

Species of starfish

Heliaster kubiniji is a species of starfish in the order Forcipulatida. It is commonly known as the gulf sun star, the common sun star or estrella de mar de golfo and it occurs in the intertidal zone of the Pacific coast of California, Mexico and Nicaragua.

== Description ==
Juvenile gulf sun stars that have recently undergone metamorphosis have five arms, but more arms grow as the animals get bigger and adults have nineteen to twenty five arms. Large individuals are a mauve colour with black and green blotching and banding while juveniles are a darker colour. It typically has a diameter of about 15 cm (6 in).

== Distribution ==
The gulf sun star is native to the eastern Pacific Ocean and its range extends from Cape Mendocino in California to Nicaragua.

== Biology ==
The gulf sea star is a predator and feeds on anything edible it can find including barnacles, bivalve molluscs, gastropod molluscs, sea anemones, chitons, sea cucumbers and crabs. Sea stars in this genus have planktonic feeding larvae that develop for many weeks before recruitment.

In 1978, starfish wasting disease devastated the population of this sea star in the Gulf of California. Previous to that it was very common on rocks and under boulders in the lower and middle intertidal zone, with a density of up to one individual per square metre. The population decline was associated with higher than normal water temperatures and the changes brought about by an El Niño event. The sea star almost became extinct in the gulf and had still not recovered in many parts by the year 2000. Because this sea star is a top-level predator, its virtual disappearance was expected to have profound effects on the ecosystem. However, the predatory rock snail Morula ferruginosa increased in abundance and kept the barnacles on which the sea star had previously fed under control, and the ecosystem in balance.
