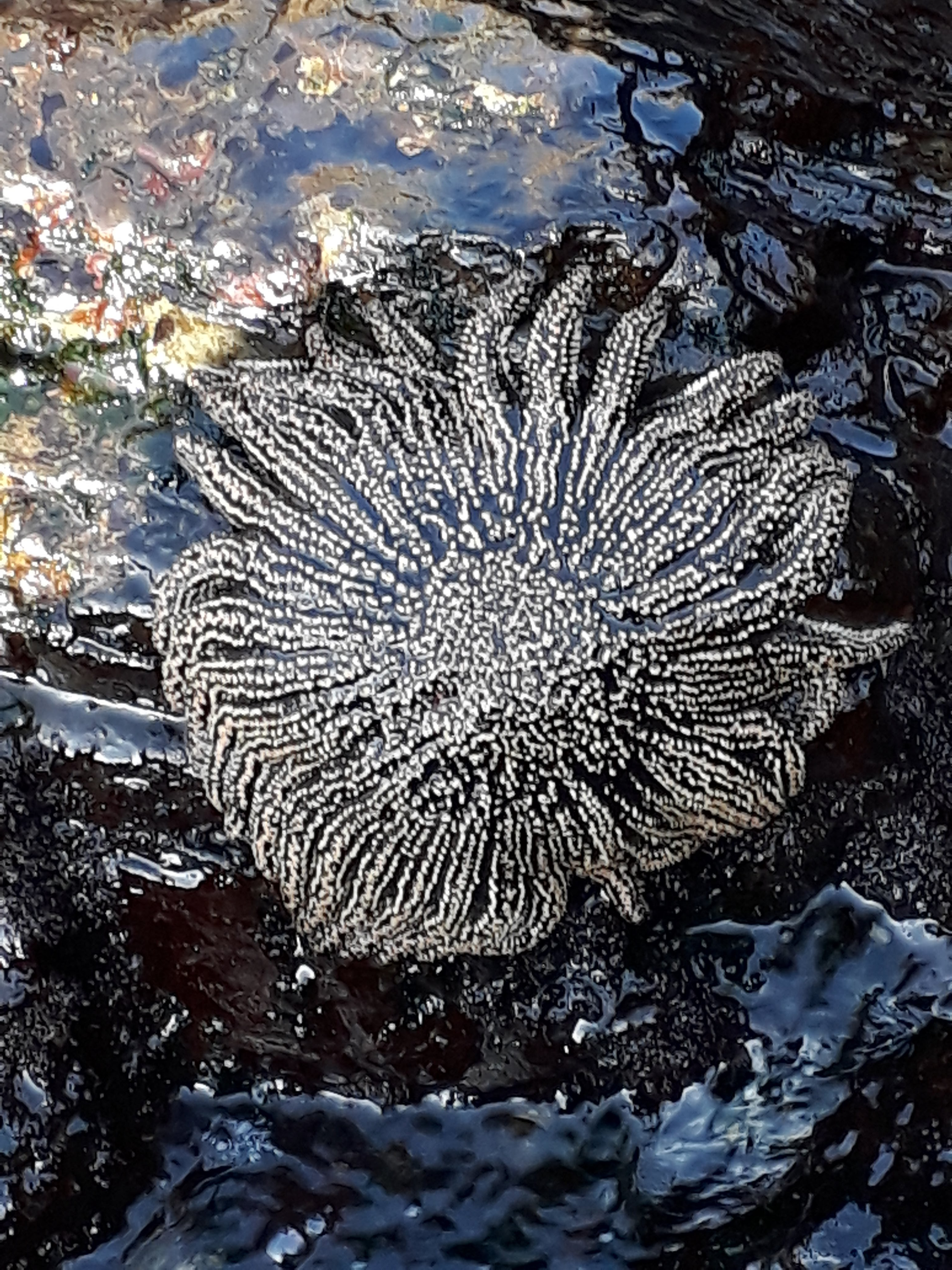

Scientific classification
- Domain: Eukaryota
- Kingdom: Animalia
- Phylum: Echinodermata
- Class: Asteroidea
- Order: Forcipulatida
- Family: Heliasteridae
- Genus: Heliaster
- Species: H. helianthus

Binomial name
- Heliaster helianthus (Lamarck, 1816)

Synonyms
- Asteracanthion helianthus (Lamarck, 1816); Asterias helianthus Lamarck, 1816; Stellonia helianthus (Lamarck, 1816)

= Heliaster helianthus =

Species of starfish

Heliaster helianthus, the sun star, is a species of Asteroidea (starfish) in the family Heliasteridae. It is found in shallow water rocky habitats and in the kelp forests off the Pacific coast of Ecuador, Peru and Chile.

== Description ==
Heliaster helianthus is a multi-armed starfish, the number of arms usually being in the range 28 to 39, and the diameter typically being between 16 and 20 cm (6 and 8 in). The aboral (upper) surface is brown with reddish tubercles while the oral (under) surface is white or yellowish-white.

The disc is broad and the ossicles (plate-like components in the skin) in the proximal parts of the arms (closest to the disc) are connected to those of the neighbouring arms by connective tissue, forming inter-arm septa. This means that only a small part of each arm is free, the rest appearing to form part of the disc.

== Distribution and habitat ==
This species is present in the southeastern Pacific Ocean, along the west coast of South America. Its range includes Ecuador, Peru and Chile, and it is the only species in its genus present in Chile where it is easily observed on rocks in shallow water.

== Ecology ==
Heliaster helianthus is preyed on by the starfish Meyenaster gelatinosus. In general, small individuals are eaten whole and large individuals are immune from attack, but medium-sized individuals lose arms by autotomy. Having trapped its prey, M. gelatinosus everts its stomach over several arms of its victim, which become autotomised in response to the predation. When this happens, the arms do not detach at the point where they become free, but higher up at their bases; at the same time, a split occurs along the connective tissue linking the arms to adjoining ones, indicating that a layer of mutable collagen is present there.
