= Asterias solaris =

Asterias solaris is a synonym of two sea star species:

- Asterias solaris Schreber, 1793 is Acanthaster solaris (Schreber, 1793).
- Asterias solaris Carpenter, 1856 is Heliaster cumingi (Gray, 1840).
