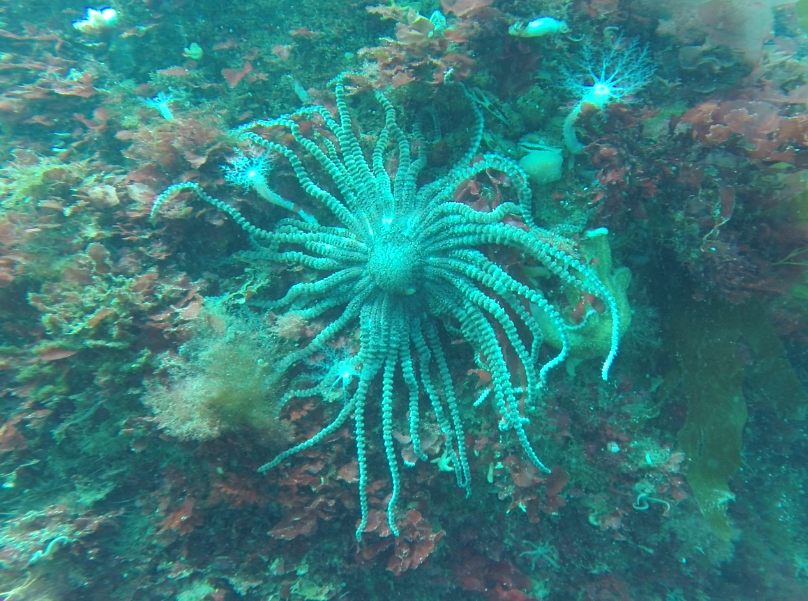

Scientific classification
- Kingdom: Animalia
- Phylum: Echinodermata
- Class: Asteroidea
- Order: Forcipulatida
- Family: Heliasteridae
- Genus: Labidiaster; Lütken, 1871

= Labidiaster =

Genus of echinoderms

Labidiaster is a genus of echinoderms belonging to the family Heliasteridae. The species of this genus are found in the coasts of Antarctica and southernmost South America. The life cycle of all Labidiaster animals starts with an embryo that will hatch into planktonic larvae, and later transform into pentamerous juvenile sea stars.

Two species are recognized:

- L. annulatus Sladen, 1889
- L. radiosus Lovén, 1871
