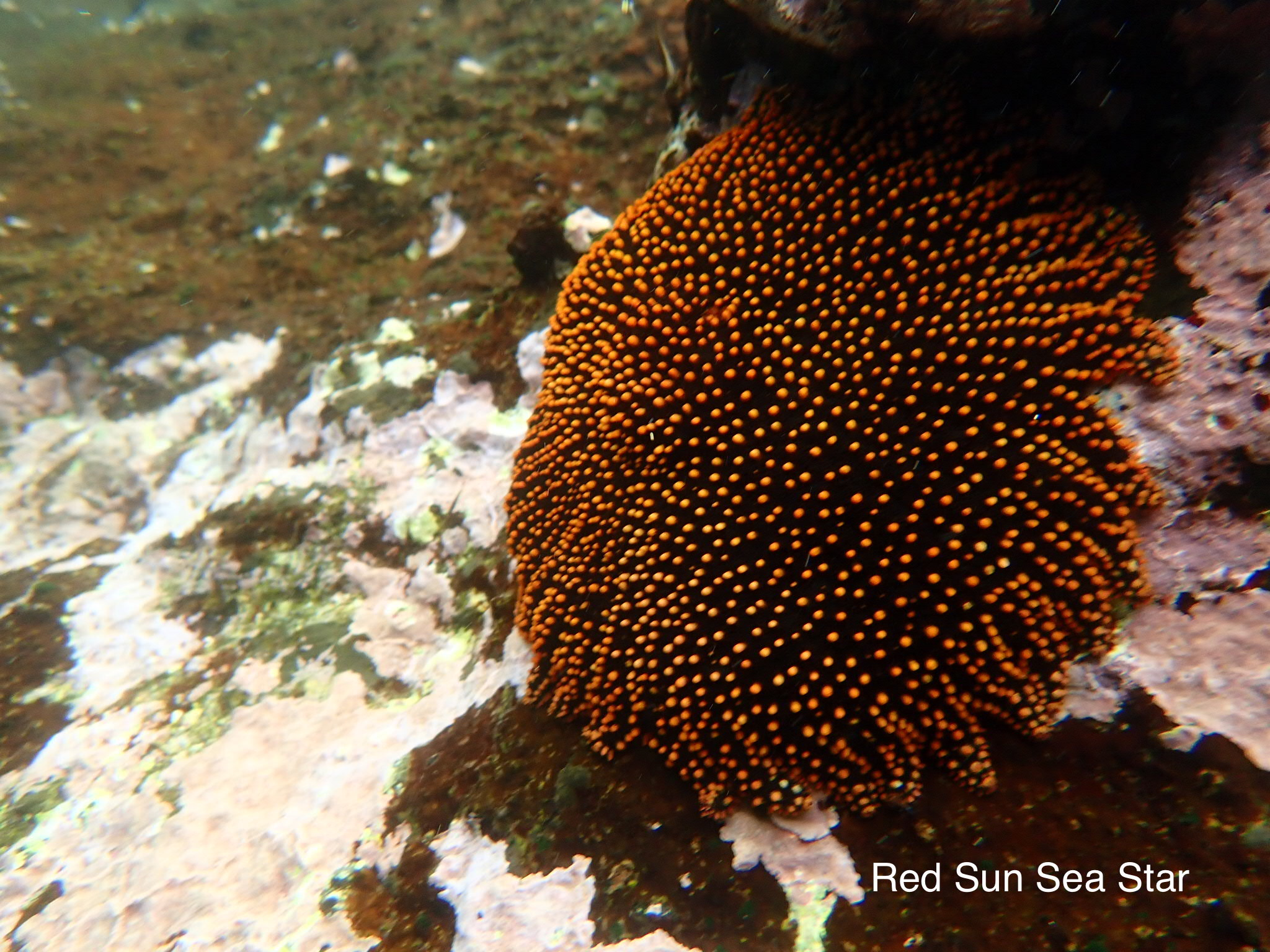

Scientific classification
- Kingdom: Animalia
- Phylum: Echinodermata
- Class: Asteroidea
- Order: Forcipulatida
- Family: Heliasteridae
- Genus: Heliaster
- Species: H. cumingi

Binomial name
- Heliaster cumingi (Gray, 1840)

Synonyms
- Asterias cumingii Gray, 1840; Asterias solaris Carpenter, 1856

= Heliaster cumingi =

Species of starfish

Heliaster cumingi is a species of starfish in the family Heliasteridae. The species can be found in the Gulf of California as well as off the coast of Ecuador and the Galápagos Islands.
