= Vibrio pectenicida =

Scientific classification
- Domain: Bacteria
- Kingdom: Pseudomonadati
- Phylum: Pseudomonadota
- Class: Gammaproteobacteria
- Order: Vibrionales
- Family: Vibrionaceae
- Genus: Vibrio
- Species: V. pectenicida

Binomial name
- Vibrio pectenicida Lambert et al. 1998

Species of bacterium

Vibrio pectenicida, sometimes abbreviated V. pec, is a species of bacterium, of which strain A365 is associated with disease in scallop (Pecten maximus) larvae. Strain A365 is the type strain (= CIP 105190^{T}) and does not use glucose or fructose as carbon sources, but uses rhamnose and betaine.

Vibrio pectenicida strain FHCF-3 has been identified as a causative agent of a sea star wasting disease decimating sunflower sea stars (Pycnopodia helianthoides) since 2013. The draft genome is 4,368,354 bp and has 3,903 coding sequences, three of which encode putative aerolysin-like toxins that can disrupt cellular membranes and are associated with virulence. The bacterium responds to enrichment with a variety of organic matter sources on asteroid surfaces, and was found in healthy sea cucumbers and sea stars, along with plankton in Australia, Hong Kong, and Okinawa.
