= Sea star wasting disease =

Disease of starfish

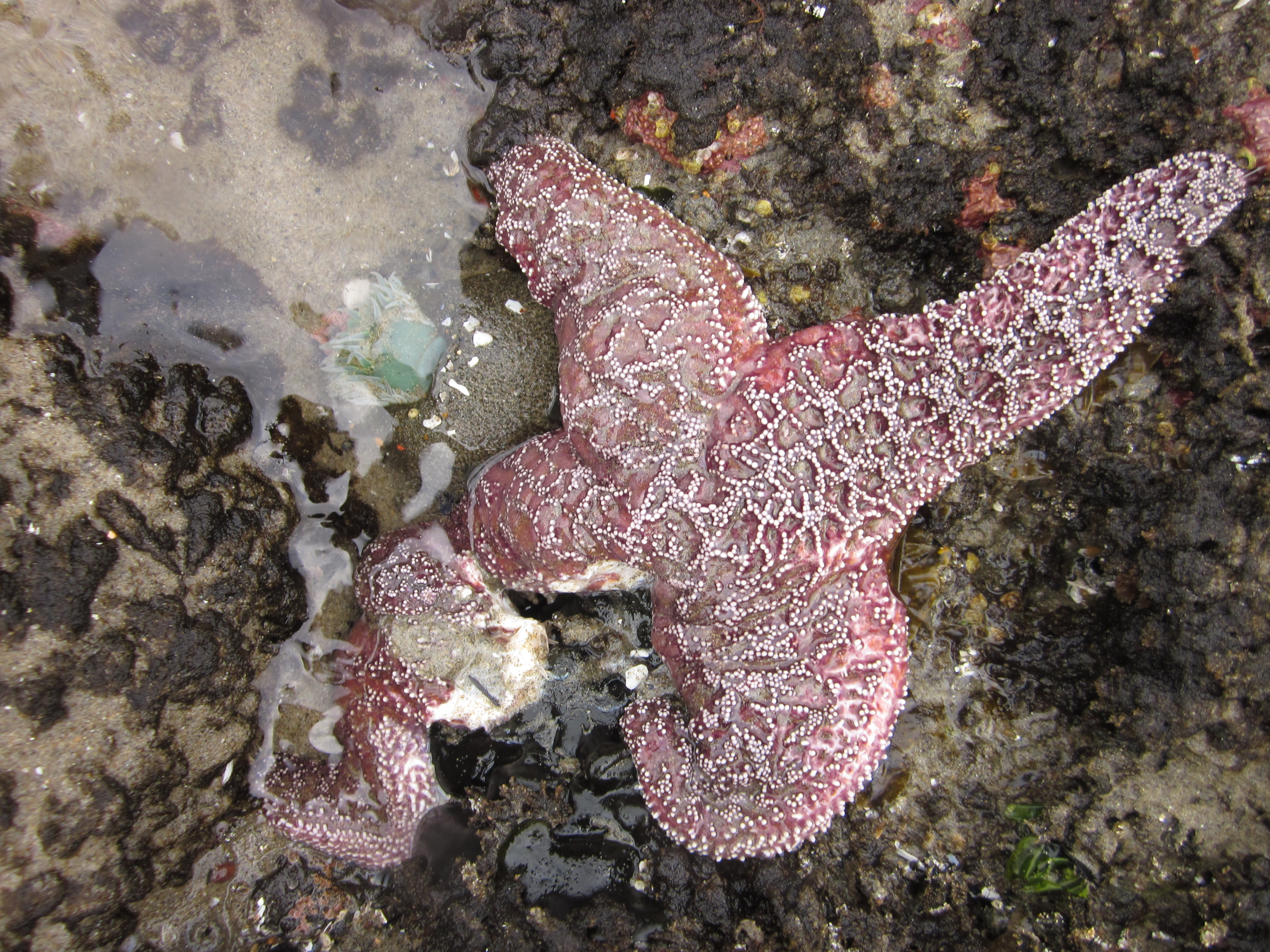
The leg of this Pisaster ochraceus sea star in Oregon is disintegrating as a result of sea star wasting disease

Sea star wasting disease (SSWD) or starfish wasting syndrome is a disease of starfish and several other echinoderms that appears sporadically, causing mass mortality of those affected. The disease has affected over 20 species of sea stars, many of which are found on the western coast of North America. The disease seems to be associated with increased water temperatures in some locales, but not others. It starts with the emergence of lesions, followed by body fragmentation and death. As of 2025, more than 5 billion sea stars have been lost from the 2013 plague, resulting in a population decline of over 90% in some species. The decimated numbers of sea stars on the Pacific Northwest coast has led to major ecosystem imbalance, with rising sea urchin populations due to the lack of sea star predation, which uncontrollably feed on the local kelp forests. In 2014, it was suggested that the disease is associated with a single-stranded DNA virus now known as the sea star-associated densovirus (SSaDV), but this hypothesis was refuted by research in 2018 and 2020. In 2025, a study published in the journal Nature Ecology and Evolution showed that the bacterium Vibrio pectenicida strain FHCF-3 caused a SSWD-like condition in Pycnopodia helianthoides.

== Symptoms ==
Typically the first symptom of sea star wasting disease is refusal to accept food followed by listlessness for weeks and then white lesions that appear on the surface of the starfish and spread rapidly, followed by decay of tissue surrounding the lesions. Next the animal becomes limp as the water vascular system fails and it is no longer able to maintain its internal hydrostatic balance. The sea star loses its grip on the substrate. The body structure begins to break down, signs of stretching appear between the arms which may twist and fall off, and the animal dies. The arms may continue to crawl around for a while after being shed. Progression of these events can be rapid, leading to death within a few days.

A deflated appearance can precede other morphological signs of the disease. All of these symptoms are also associated with ordinary attributes of unhealthy stars and can arise when an individual is stranded too high in the intertidal zone (for example) and simply desiccates. "True" wasting disease will be present in individuals that are found in suitable habitat, often in the midst of other individuals that might also be affected.

The final result is a disintegrated, white, mushy blob, which no longer seems to be a sea star.

== 1972 plague ==
The 1972 plague was the first notable case of sea star wasting disease. Scientists noticed a rapidly declining population of common starfish (Asterias rubens) occurring off the east coast of the United States. The symptoms were that the starfish became limp and lost limbs until finally melting into a white mucus-like paste.

== 1978 plague ==
In 1978 large numbers of Heliaster kubiniji succumbed to a wasting disease in the Gulf of California. At the time, it was suspected that high water temperatures were a causal factor. This sea star became locally extinct in some parts of the gulf, and some populations had not recovered by the year 2000. Because this sea star was a top-level predator, its disappearance had profound effects on the ecosystem. In the Channel Islands off the coast of California, ten species of sea star were recorded as being affected as well as three species of sea urchins, two brittle stars and a sea cucumber, all of which experienced large population declines.

== 2013–current plagues ==
In July 2013, populations of sea stars declined rapidly on the east coast of the US between New Jersey and Maine. There had been a great increase in sea star numbers three years earlier, though in 2013 they were dying off. No cause for the mysterious deaths was apparent. On the Pacific coast, a meltdown of sea stars was first found in ochre stars and sunflower stars in Howe Sound, British Columbia. In late August, the disease had also been found stretching from Alaska to the border of Mexico, affecting more than 20 species of sea stars on the west coast of North America.

At the beginning of September 2013, a mass die-off of sea stars was reported off the coast of British Columbia. The sea bed was littered with disintegrating sunflower stars (Pycnopodia helianthoides), their detached arms and discs. Another species also suffering mortalities was the morning sun star (Solaster dawsoni), but no cause for the deaths was apparent. If they were caused by infection or toxins, the two species might have affected each other because the diet of each includes sea stars.

In early to mid-2013, reports of sea stars experiencing wasting symptoms came from Vancouver, B.C., and from southern and central California. Observations of symptoms spread throughout California, Washington and southern Canada throughout 2013, but sea star wasting disease did not begin affecting sea stars in the intertidal zone in Oregon until spring 2014. The relatively high resolution of understanding of the pattern of disease spread came from marine scientists working along the coast, but also from citizen scientists visiting the coast and uploading their observations, of where they saw sea stars both with and without disease symptoms, to an online sea star wasting observation log database.

Because scientists had been studying sea star populations before the outbreak of sea star wasting disease, there is a good understanding of how the disease affected population sizes and dynamics. A study of the ochre sea star (Pisaster ochraceus) populations from San Diego, California, to southern British Columbia, along with at two locations near Sitka, Alaska, found that population declines were proportionately greater for sea stars in the southern part of the coast than the north; population numbers are usually higher at more northerly locations, so the number of sea stars that died from wasting disease was often higher at more northern sites.

In October 2013, in a marine laboratory seawater tank in California holding various species of sea stars, other species started displaying similar symptoms. The ochre star (Pisaster ochraceus) was the first affected. Most of these developed symptoms, lost arms and died over the course of a week or so. Later the rainbow star (Orthasterias koehleri) developed the disease and died, but the bat star (Patiria miniata) and leather star (Dermasterias imbricata), which were living in the same tank and had been scavenging on the corpses, showed no ill effects. At Natural Bridges State Marine Reserve in California, the ochre star is normally a common resident on the mussel beds, but by November 2013 it was reported to have completely disappeared.

As of 2021, the sea star wasting disease, following its initial outbreak in 2013, is regarded as a record-breaking marine epizootic.

There have been signs of some recovery of ochre sea star populations (Pisaster ochraceus), with higher numbers of juvenile sea stars in the intertidal than had been previously common, especially for northern sites along the Pacific coast. However, the biomass and the function of ochre sea stars in their communities, such as being important predators of mussels, has remained lower than pre-disease levels.

== Locations ==
Currently, most cases are located on the west coast of North America, affecting sea stars from Baja California to the gulf of Alaska. Sea star wasting events have also been reported worldwide.

== Causes ==
As of August 2025, the bacterium Vibrio pectenicida strain FHCF-3 has been experimentally shown to cause a sea star wasting disease-like condition in Pycnopodia helianthoides. Another genetically distinct isolate of this species, Vibrio pectenicida strain A365, is associated with disease in larval scallops. Researchers identified and isolated V. pectenicida strain FHCF-3 from the coelomic fluid of dying sea stars. They then induced a sea star wasting disease-like condition in healthy, lab-raised Pycnopodia helianthoides by injecting healthy specimens with the bacterial isolate and re-isolating the bacterium from specimens that lost arms and died, fulfilling Koch's postulates. Vibrio pectenicida strain FHCF-3 putatively encodes aerolysin-like toxins that are postulated to play a role in SSWD. Researchers previously did not identify this pathogen as tissue samples they studied did not contain the coelomic fluids that surrounded the organs of sea stars. It is unclear whether the sea star wasting disease-like condition observed in Pycnopodia helianthoides can be extended to other species, nor whether this was the same agent involved in the 2013–2015 mass mortality.

Other conditions that could possibly affect sea star wasting disease include high sea temperatures, oxygen depletion, and low salinity due to freshwater runoff. Research has shown that elevated water temperatures are correlated with an increase in both incidence and severity of the syndrome. The disease also appears to be more prevalent in sheltered, calmer waters than in open seas, where there is significantly more wave movement. One result of global warming is higher sea temperatures, which has resulted in waves of unusually warm water along the west coast of the United States, which is where all of the sea stars are dying off. These may impact both starfish and echinoderm populations in general. However, temperature was not related to the initial outbreak of sea star wasting disease at many places along the coast. Unlike with many other wildlife diseases, there was no link between the density of sea stars at a location before disease outbreak and the severity of population decline. Thus, this outbreak has defied prediction using what is typically understood about disease spread.

Research in 2014 purported that the cause of the disease is transmissible from one starfish to another and that the disease-causing agent is a microorganism in the virus-size range. The most likely candidate causal agent was found to be the sea star-associated densovirus (SSaDV), which was found to be in greater abundance in diseased starfish than in healthy ones, but with no conclusive mechanism proven. Subsequent work in 2018 and 2020 showed that SSaDV was not associated with sea star wasting disease. Work in 2021 provided evidence that sea star wasting disease may be linked to microorganisms that inhabit the diffusive boundary layer around sea star tissues; elevated water temperatures and increased supply or organic matter which is released from phytoplankton may cause these bacteria to deplete oxygen in waters around sea stars and thus affect the ability of sea stars to respire.

== Treatment ==
In 2014, Point Defiance Zoo & Aquarium lost more than half of its 369 sea stars, and by September 2015 they numbered fewer than 100. The aquarium treated its affected sea stars with antibiotics in 2014, which proved effective. The Oregon Coast Aquarium treated their affected sea stars with Seachem Reef Dip, followed by probiotics. Although a mechanism is still unknown, evidence suggests that a single mutation in the elongation factor 1-alpha locus in Pisaster ochraceus may be associated with reduced mortality.

== Species affected ==
Most affected (high mortality rates):

- Solaster dawsoni (morning sun star),
- Pisaster brevispinus (giant pink star),
- Pisaster ochraceus (ochre/purple star),
- Pycnopodia helianthoides (sunflower star),
- Evasterias troschelii (mottled star),

Affected (some mortality):

- Dermasterias imbricata (leather star),
- Solaster stimpsoni (striped sun star),
- Orthasterias koehleri (rainbow star),
- Henricia spp. (blood star),
- Leptasterias spp (six-armed star),
- Patiria (Asterina) miniata (bat star),
- Asterias rubens (common starfish), and
- Pisaster giganteus (giant star)

== See also ==
- Effects of global warming on oceans
