= Quadrangle =

Quadrangle or The Quadrangle may refer to:

== Architecture ==
- Quadrangle (architecture), a courtyard surrounded by a building or several buildings, often at a college

Various specific quadrangles, often called "the quad" or "the quadrangle":

=== North America ===
- Quadrangle (Springfield, Massachusetts), a cluster of museums and cultural institutions
- Quadrangle Dormitories (University of Pennsylvania)
- Francis Quadrangle, University of Missouri
- Memorial Quadrangle, Yale University
- Radcliffe Quadrangle (Harvard)
- Schenley Quadrangle, University of Pittsburgh
- University of Alabama Quad, University of Alabama

=== Europe ===
- Mob Quad, Merton College, Oxford
- Radcliffe Quadrangle, University College, Oxford
- Tom Quad (Great Quadrangle), Christ Church, Oxford
- Main Quad at the Main Building of University College London

=== Oceania ===
- University of Sydney Quadrangle, a sandstone building at the University of Sydney (Camperdown)

== Other ==
- Quadrangle (geography), a United States Geological Survey topographical map
- Quadrangle (horse), American thoroughbred, winner of the 1964 Belmont Stakes
- Quadrangle Books, an imprint of Times Books
- Quadrangle Group investment fund in New York City
- BDP Quadrangle, Toronto, Canada
- Complete quadrangle (projective geometry), a configuration with four points and six lines
- Love quadrangle, variant form of a love triangle, in which three people vie for the affections of a fourth
- The Quadrangle (Antarctica), a glacial cirque on Alexander Island
- The Quadrangle (Manhattan College), the student newspaper of Manhattan College
- Quadrilateral (geometry), a four sided polygon

== See also ==
- Quad (disambiguation)
- Siheyuan, a Chinese architectural style also known as "Chinese quadrangle"
