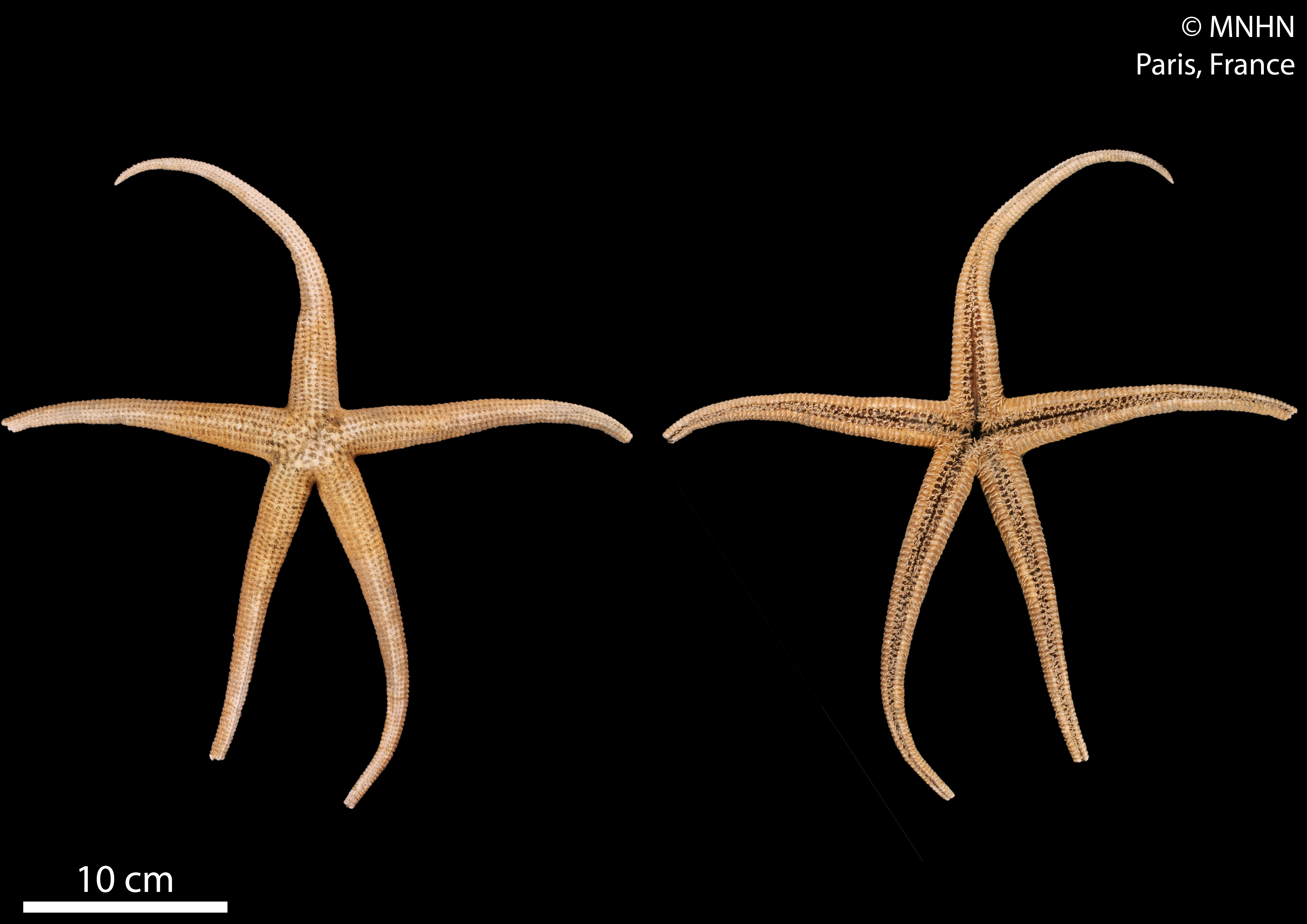
- Myxoderma acutibrachia

Scientific classification
- Kingdom: Animalia
- Phylum: Echinodermata
- Class: Asteroidea
- Order: Forcipulatida
- Family: Zoroasteridae
- Genus: Myxoderma; Fisher, 1905

= Myxoderma (echinoderm) =

Genus of sea stars

Myxoderma is a genus of sea stars belonging to the family Zoroasteridae.

The species of this genus are found on the coasts of Pacific Ocean.

Species:

- Myxoderma acutibrachia Aziz & Jangoux, 1984
- Myxoderma longispinum (Ludwig, 1905)
