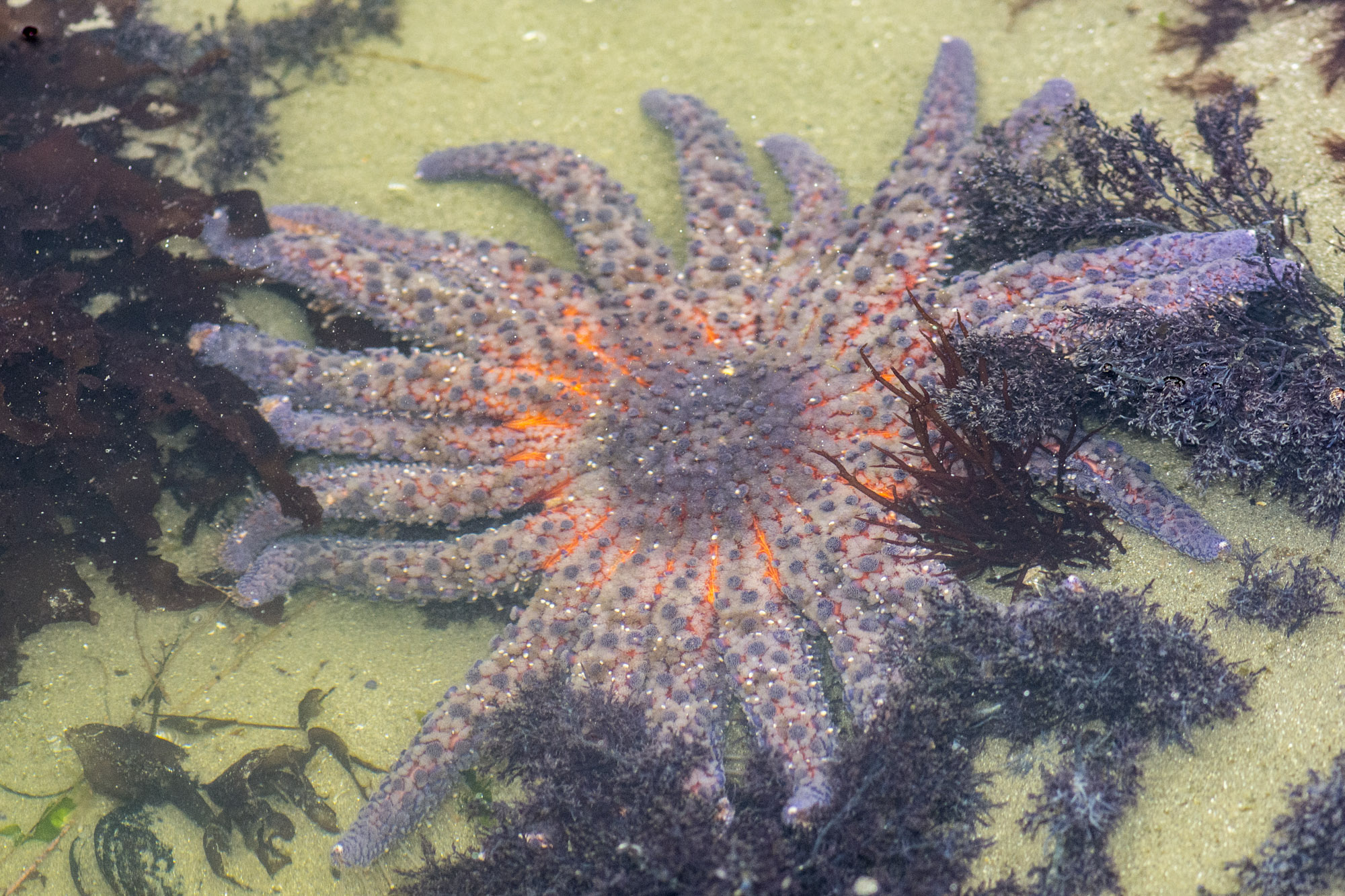

Conservation status
- Critically Endangered (IUCN 3.1)

Scientific classification
- Kingdom: Animalia
- Phylum: Echinodermata
- Class: Asteroidea
- Order: Forcipulatida
- Family: Asteriidae
- Genus: Pycnopodia; Stimpson, 1862
- Species: P. helianthoides

Binomial name
- Pycnopodia helianthoides (Brandt, 1835)

= Sunflower sea star =

Species of echinoderm

Pycnopodia helianthoides, commonly known as the sunflower sea star, is a large sea star found in the northeastern Pacific Ocean. The only species of its genus, it is among the largest sea stars in the world, with a maximum arm span of 1 m (3.3 ft). Adult sunflower sea stars usually have 16 to 24 limbs. They vary in color. Sunflower sea stars are predatory and carnivorous, feeding mostly on sea urchins, clams, sea snails, and other small invertebrates. Although the species was widely distributed throughout the northeast Pacific, its population rapidly declined from 2013. The sunflower sea star is classified as Critically Endangered on the IUCN Red List.

== Description ==
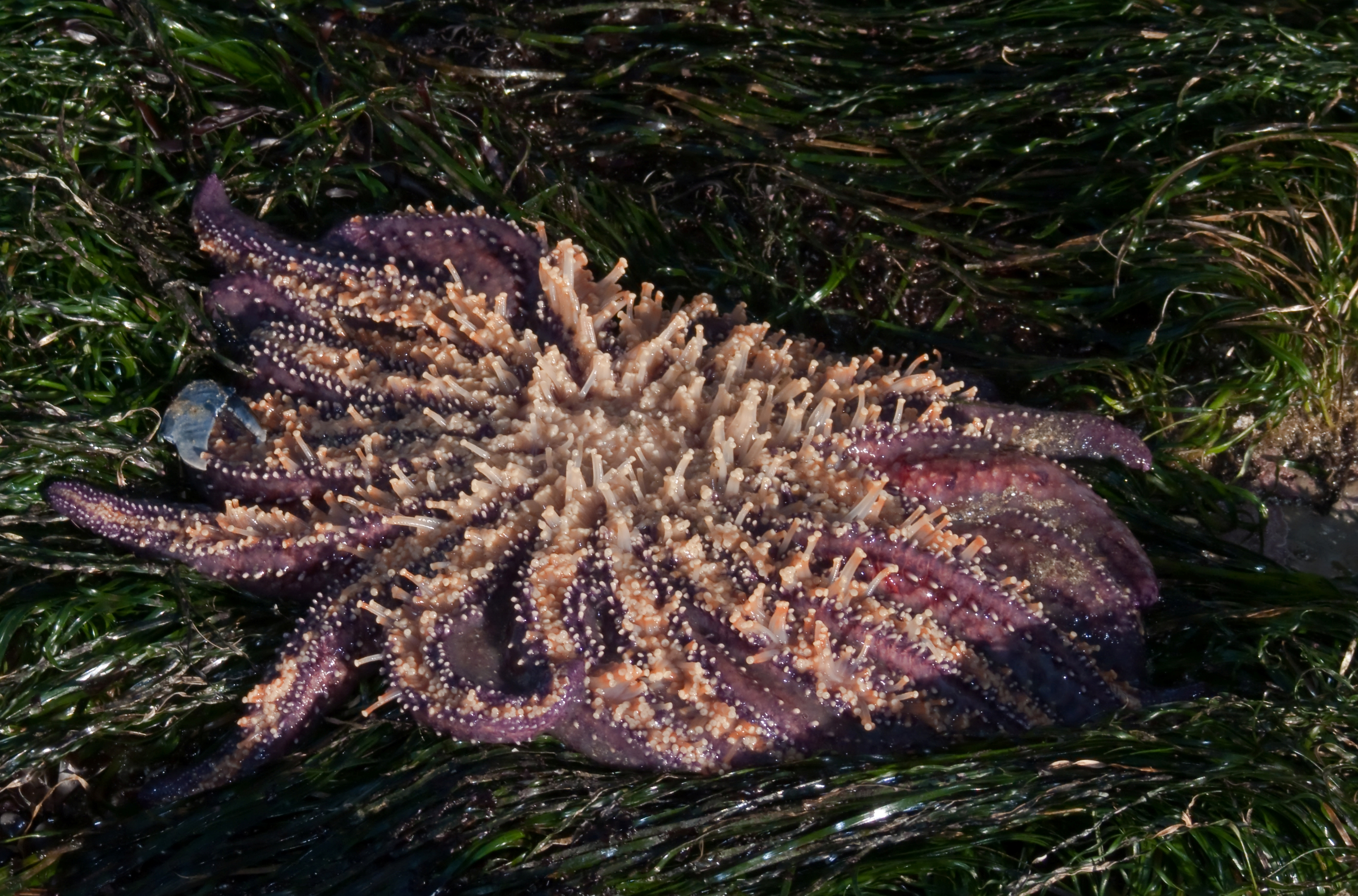
Underside of a sunflower sea star

Sunflower sea stars can reach an arm span of 1 m (3.3 ft). They are the heaviest known sea star, weighing about 5 kg. They are the second-biggest sea star in the world, second only to the little known deep water Midgardia xandaros, whose arm span is 134 cm (53 in) and whose body is 2.6 cm (roughly 1 inch) wide. Growth begins rapidly, but slows as the animal ages. Researchers estimate a growth rate of 8 cm (3.1 in)/year in the first several years of life, and a rate of 2.5 cm (0.98 in)/year later.

Their color ranges from bright orange, yellow-red to brown, and sometimes purple, with soft, velvet-textured bodies and 5–24 arms with powerful suckers. Most sea star species have a mesh-like skeleton that protects their internal organs.

== Distribution and habitat ==
Sunflower sea stars were once common in the northeast Pacific from Alaska to southern California, and were dominant in Puget Sound, British Columbia, northern California, and southern Alaska. Between 2013 and 2015, the population declined rapidly due to sea star wasting disease and warmer water temperatures caused by global climate change. The species disappeared from its habitats in the waters off the coast of California and Oregon, and saw its population reduced by 99.2% in the waters near Washington. Ecologists using shallow-water observations and deep offshore trawl surveys found that, in their study period (2004–2017), mean biomass of sunflower sea stars declined 80–100%. In 2020, the species was declared critically endangered by the International Union for Conservation of Nature. Sea star wasting disease is now known to be caused by the bacterial pathogen Vibrio pectenicida, which also infects scallops.

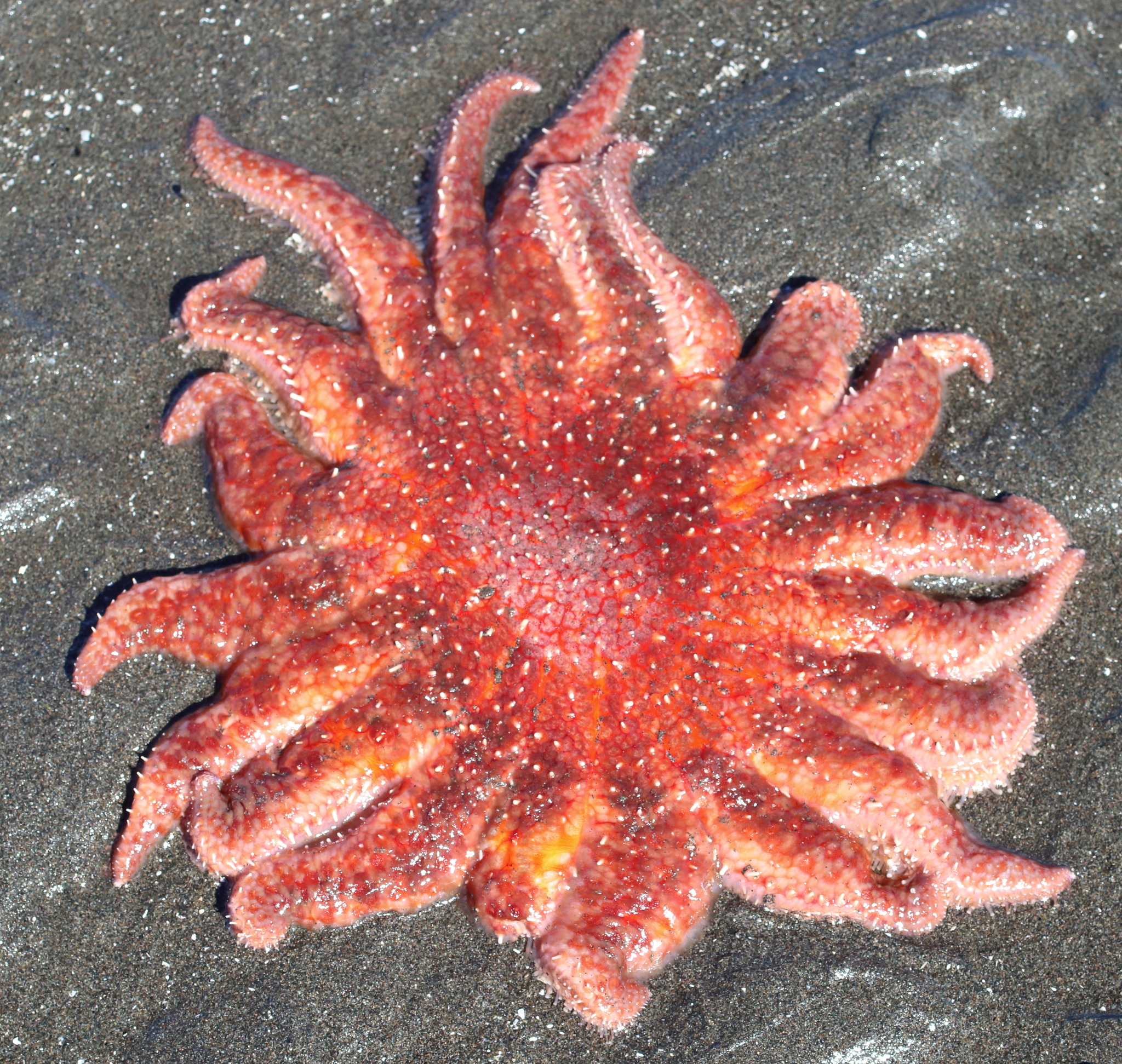
MacDonald Spit, Alaska, 2022

Sunflower sea stars generally inhabit low subtidal and intertidal areas up to 435m deep that are rich in seaweed, kelp, sand, mud, shells, gravel, or rocky bottoms. They do not venture into high- and mid-tide areas because their body structure is heavy, and requires water to support it.

== Diet and behavior ==
Sunflower sea stars are efficient hunters, moving at a speed of 1 m/min (3.3 ft/min) using 15,000 tube feet that lie on their undersides. They are commonly found around urchin barrens, as the sea urchin is a favorite food. They also eat mussels, clams, snails, abalone, other gastropods, crustaceans (crabs and barnacles), fish, sea cucumbers, sand dollars and other sea stars, as well as occasionally algae and sponges. In Monterey Bay, California, they may feed on dead or dying squid. Sea star appetites and food can depend on environmental factors in their habitats, such as climate, amount of prey in the area, and latitude. Although the sunflower sea star can extend its mouth for larger prey, the stomach can extend outside the mouth to digest prey, such as abalone.

Easily stressed by predators such as large fish and other sea stars, they can shed arms to escape, which regrow within a few weeks. They are preyed upon by the king crab.

== Reproduction ==
Sunflower sea stars can reproduce sexually through broadcast spawning. They have separate sexes. Sunflower sea stars breed from May through June. In preparing to spawn, they arch up using about a dozen arms to hoist their fleshy central mass above the seafloor and release gametes into the water for external fertilization. The larvae float and feed near the surface for two to ten weeks. After the planktonic larval period, the larvae settle to the bottom and mature into juveniles. Juvenile sunflower sea stars begin life with five arms, and grow the rest as they mature. The lifespan of most sunflower sea stars is three to five years.

== Conservation efforts ==
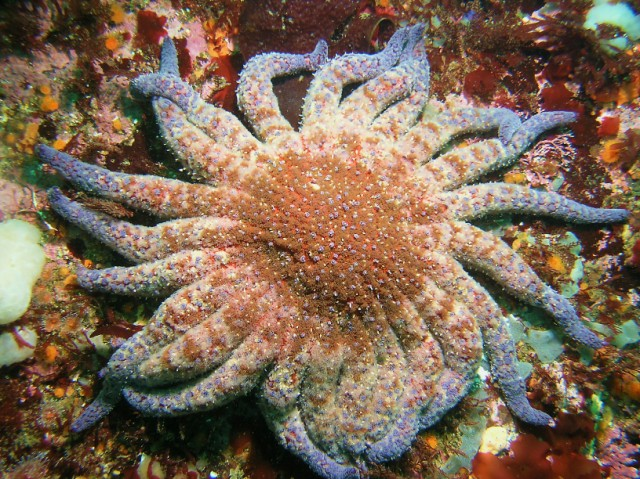
Top of sunflower sea star

Since 2013, sunflower sea star populations have been in a rapid decline due to disease and changes in climate. In 2020, the IUCN first assessed that the sunflower sea star was critically endangered. The Nature Conservancy and its partner institutions, along with the University of Washington are working to initiate captive breeding. Captive breeding efforts include seasonal production, larval development, and growth and feeding experiments. On August 18, 2021, the Center for Biological Diversity created a petition asking that the sunflower sea star be protected under the Endangered Species Act. In March 2023, the National Marine Fisheries Service proposed listing the sunflower sea star as threatened under the act.

Sea star wasting disease spreads throughout the whole body. The limbs become affected and eventually fall off, ultimately causing death from degradation. Sea star wasting disease was thought to be caused by a Sea Star-associated Densovirus (SSaDV), The disease creates behavioral changes and lesions. but in 2025 the bacterium Vibrio pectenicida strain FHCF-3 was identified as a causative agent of the disease.

This disease is known to be more prevalent and harmful in warmer water. The warming waters in California, Washington, and Oregon have coincided with the increased risk of sea star wasting disease.

Sunflower sea stars are one of sea urchins' main predators. Sea stars control their population and help maintain the health of kelp forests. Due to the decrease in sea star population, sea urchin populations are increasing and posing a threat to biodiversity, particularly in kelp forests.
