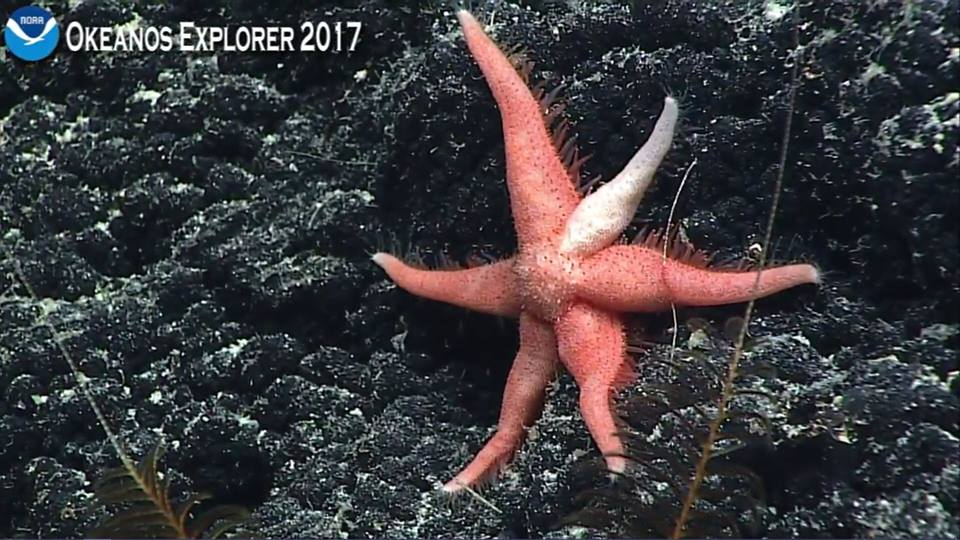

Scientific classification
- Kingdom: Animalia
- Phylum: Echinodermata
- Class: Asteroidea
- Superorder: Forcipulatacea
- Family: Paulasteriidae; Mah et al., 2015
- Genus: Paulasterias; Mah et al., 2015

Species
- Paulasterias mcclaini Mah et al., 2015; Paulasterias tyleri Mah et al., 2015

= Paulasterias =

Family of sea stars

Paulasterias is a genus of sea stars within the monotypic family Paulasteriidae.
