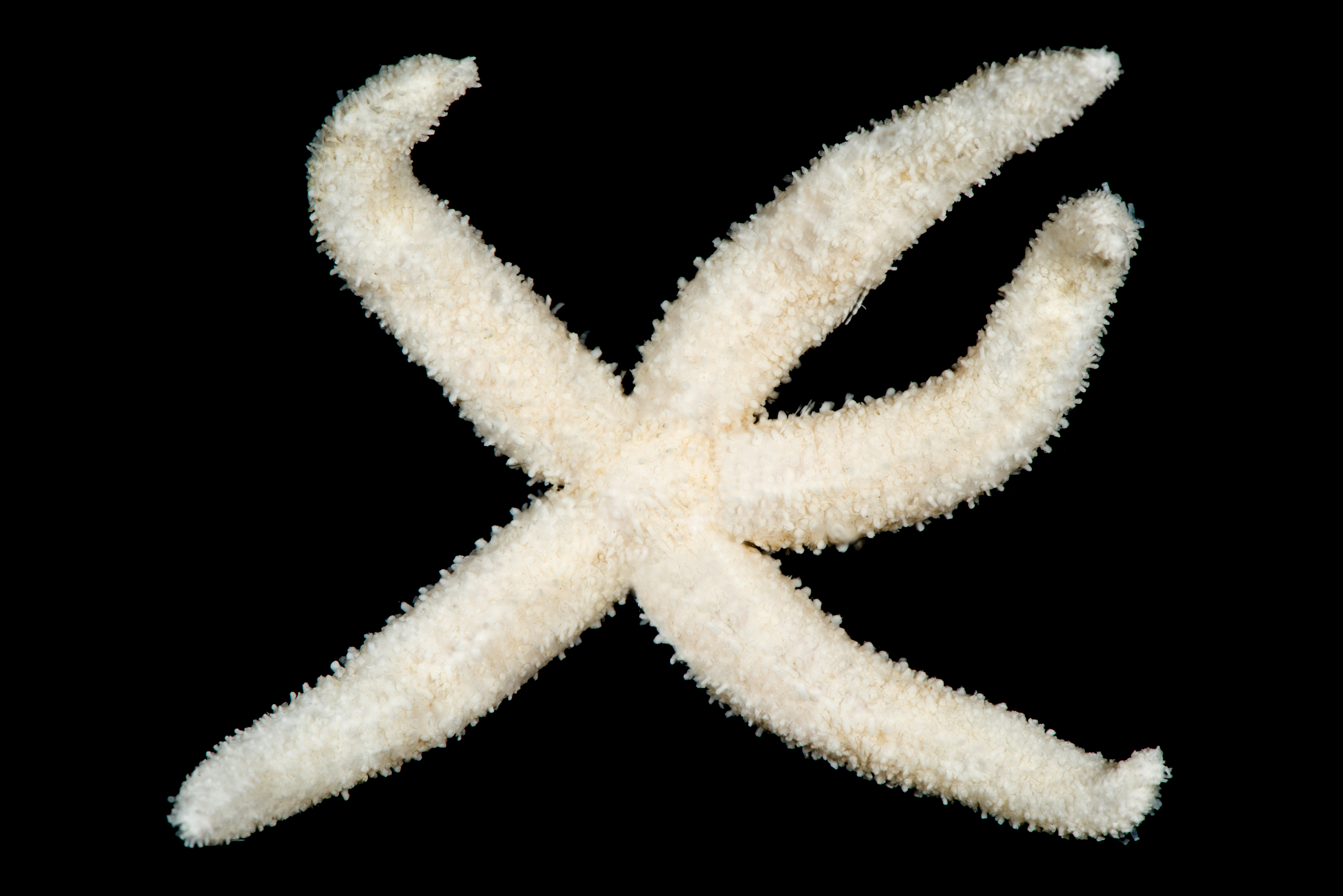
- Pedicellaster typicus M. Sars, 1861

Scientific classification
- Kingdom: Animalia
- Phylum: Echinodermata
- Class: Asteroidea
- Order: Forcipulatida
- Family: Pedicellasteridae; Perrier, 1884

= Pedicellasteridae =

Family of starfishes

Pedicellasteridae is a family of echinoderms belonging to the order Forcipulatida.

Genera:

- Afraster Blake, Breton & Gofas, 1996
- Ampheraster Fisher, 1923
- Anteliaster Fisher, 1923
- Hydrasterias Sladen, 1889
- Pedicellaster M.Sars, 1861
- Peranaster Fisher, 1923
- Tarsaster Sladen, 1889
