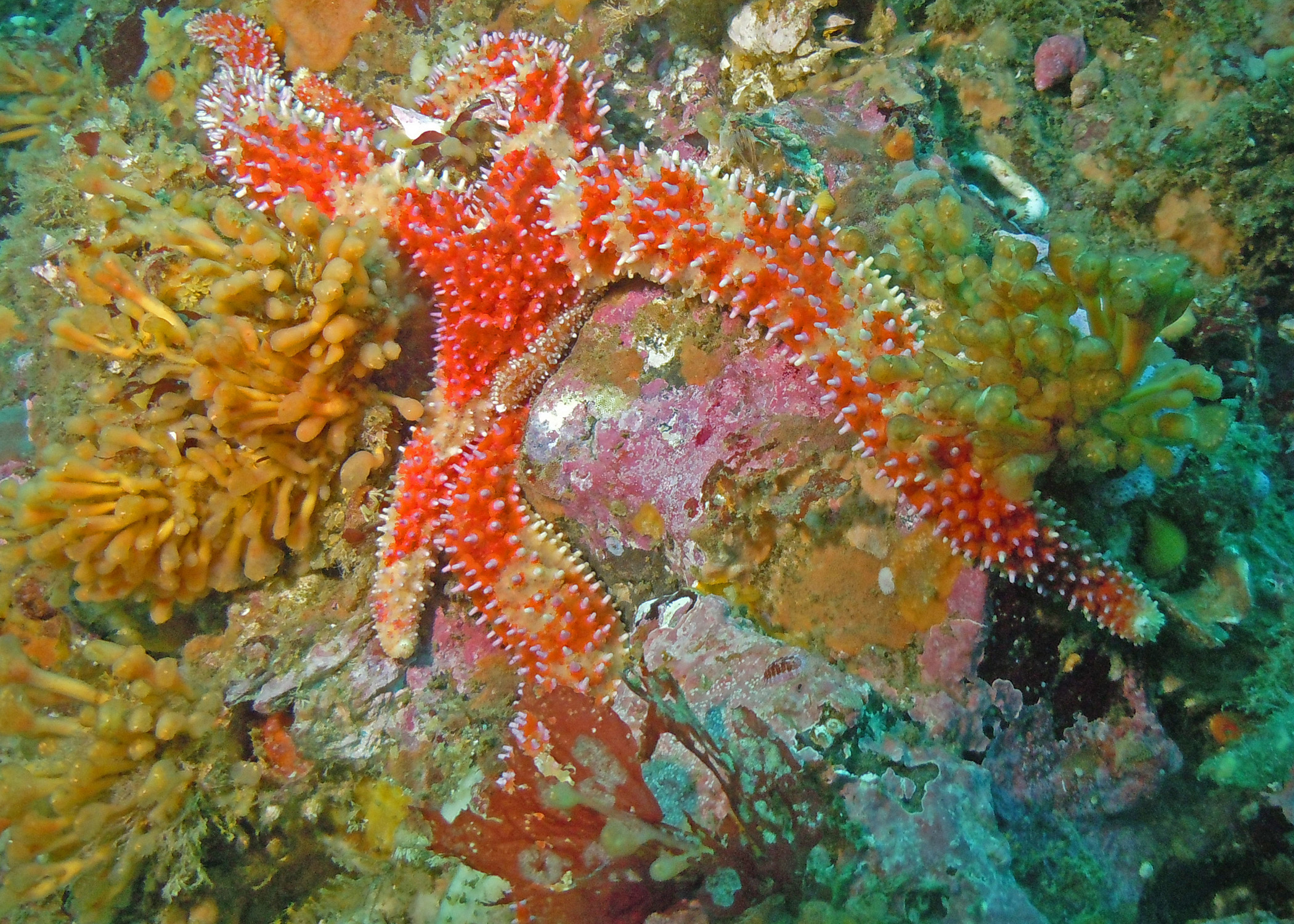

Scientific classification
- Kingdom: Animalia
- Phylum: Echinodermata
- Class: Asteroidea
- Order: Forcipulatida
- Family: Asteriidae
- Genus: Orthasterias; Verrill, 1867
- Species: O. koehleri

Binomial name
- Orthasterias koehleri (deLoriol, 1897)

Synonyms
- Asterias koehleri de Loriol, 1897; Orthasterias biordinata Verrill, 1914; Orthasterias columbiana Verrill, 1914; Orthasterias leptostyla Fisher, 1928; Orthasterias montereyensis Fisher, 1928

= Orthasterias =

Genus of starfishes

Orthasterias is a genus of sea stars in the family Asteriidae. Orthasterias koehleri, the rainbow star or red-banded sea star, is the only species in the genus. It is found in the North Pacific Ocean.

== Description ==
The rainbow star is a large starfish, growing to a diameter of about 50 centimetres (20 in) with an arm length of 21 centimetres (8.3 in). It usually has five slender tapering arms and the aboral (upper) surface is pink or red with irregular patches or bands of darker red, orange or grey. The surface is covered with sharp white or mauve spines, each surrounded by a ring of pedicellariae, tiny pincer-like organs.

== Distribution and habitat ==
The rainbow star is found in northern parts of the Pacific Ocean with its range extending from California to Alaska at depths down to about 250 metres (820 ft). It also occurs in mid-ocean on knolls and seamounts. It is an uncommon species and is usually found on soft bottoms of mud or sand, or on kelp or rock surfaces.

== Biology ==
The rainbow star is a predator and feeds on a range of invertebrates including gastropod molluscs, limpets, bivalves, brachiopods, chitons, barnacles and tunicates. In Alaska, it especially favours the ribbed clam Humilaria kennerleyi. It can dig up clams buried in the substrate and force the valves apart with the suction provided by its tube feet. It then everts part of its stomach, thrusting a fold inside the bivalve and excreting digestive enzymes onto the tissues. When these have liquefied sufficiently, the stomach engulfs them and is returned to its normal position inside the starfish.

The rainbow star is sometimes attacked by a voracious predator, the morning sun star (Solaster dawsoni). It attempts to defend itself by winding its arms round the attacker and nipping it with its thousands of pedicellariae.
