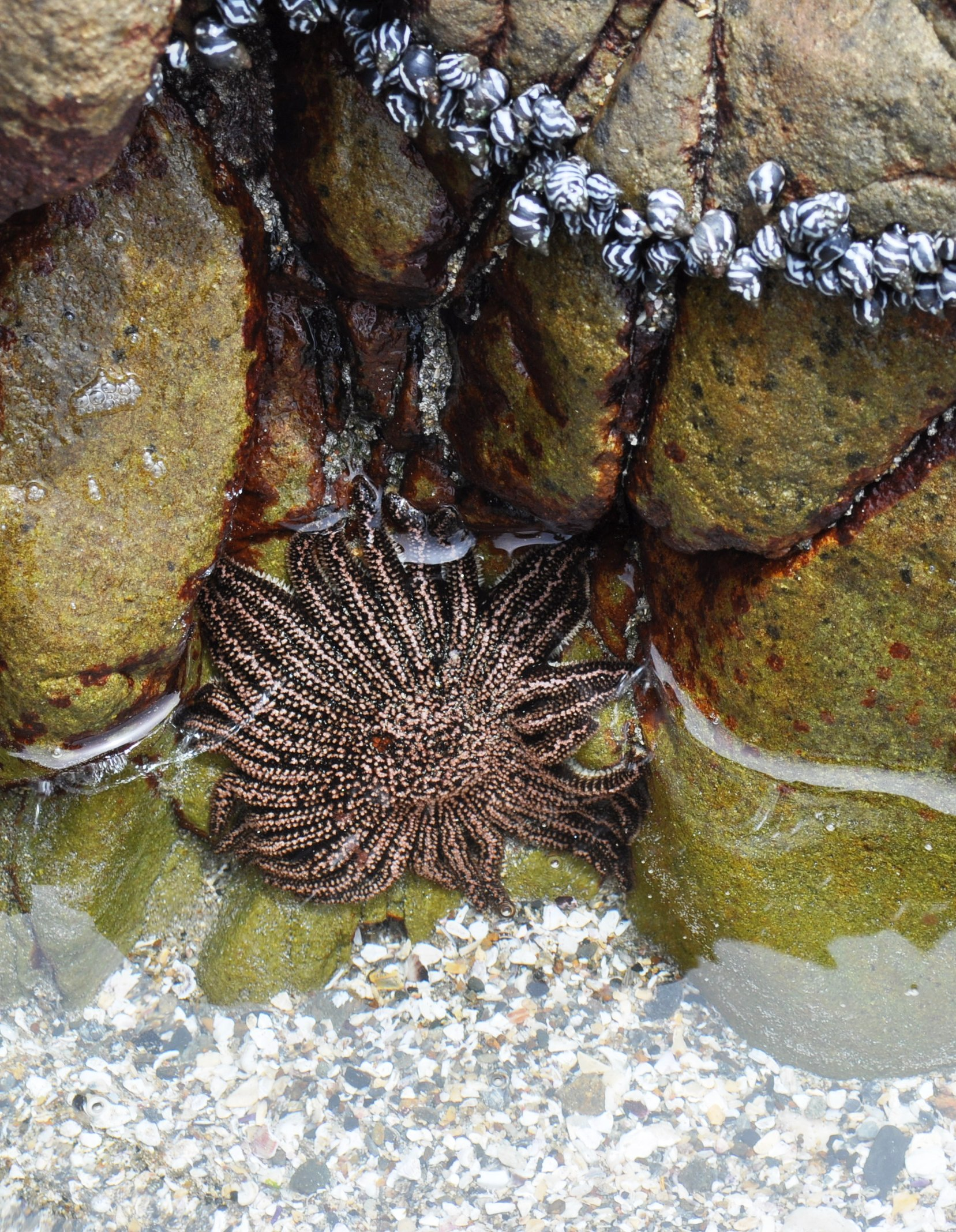
- Heliaster helianthus in Chile

Scientific classification
- Kingdom: Animalia
- Phylum: Echinodermata
- Class: Asteroidea
- Order: Forcipulatida
- Family: Heliasteridae; Viguier, 1878

Diversity
- 2 genera, 9 species

= Heliasteridae =

Family of starfishes

The Heliasteridae are a family of Asteroidea (sea stars) in the order Forcipulatida. It includes two genera: Heliaster from the East Pacific (California to Chile, including offshore islands), and Labidiaster from southernmost South America, Antarctica and subantarctic oceans.

== Genera ==
The World Register of Marine Species includes two genera and nine species within the family Heliasteridae:

Image	Genus	Species
	Heliaster Gray, 1840	Heliaster canopus Perrier, 1875; Heliaster cumingi (Gray, 1840); Heliaster helianthus (Lamarck, 1816); Heliaster kubiniji Xantus, 1860; Heliaster microbrachius Xantus, 1860; Heliaster polybrachius H.L. Clark, 1907; Heliaster solaris A.H. Clark, 1920
	Labidiaster Lütken, 1872	Labidiaster annulatus Sladen, 1889; Labidiaster radiosus Lütken, 1871
