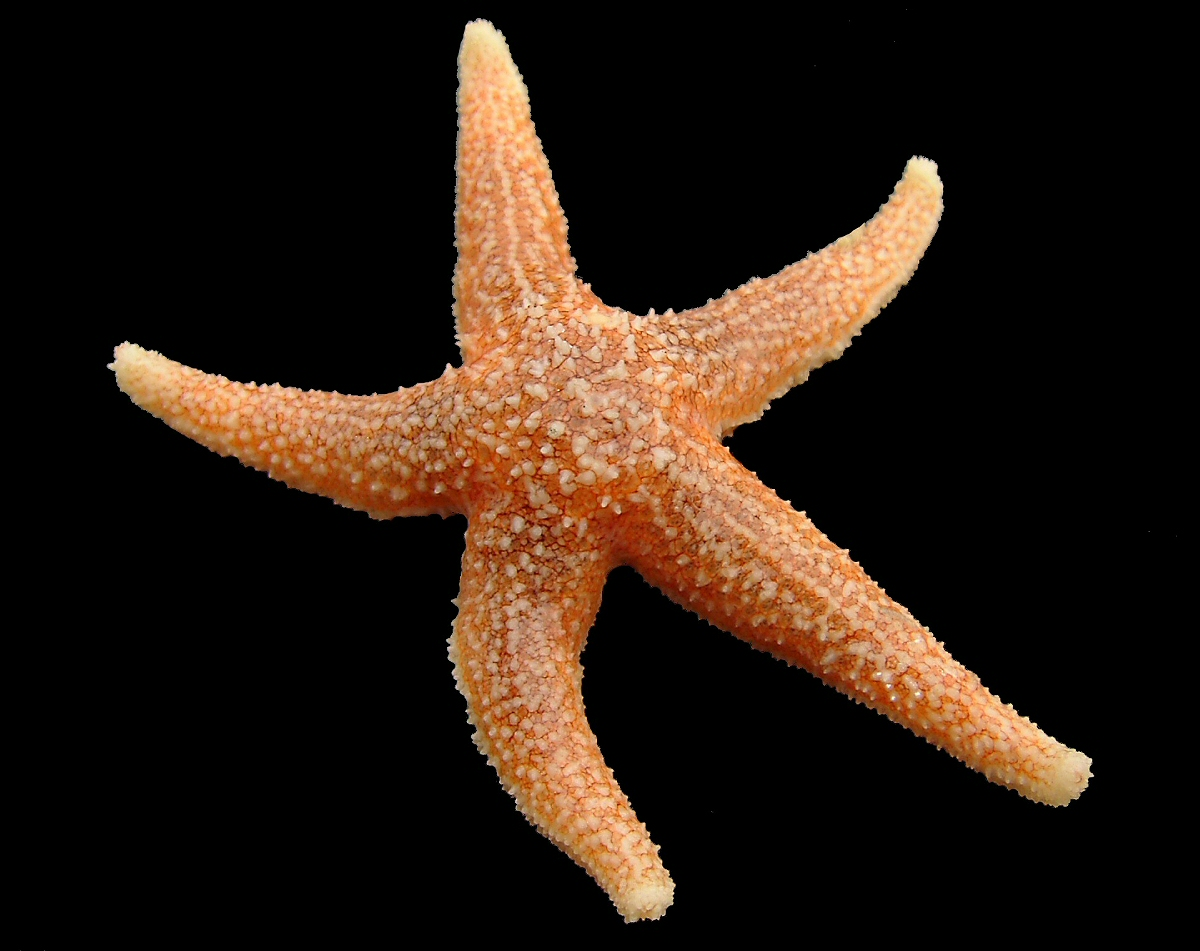
- Asterias rubens

Scientific classification
- Kingdom: Animalia
- Phylum: Echinodermata
- Class: Asteroidea
- Superorder: Forcipulatacea; Blake, 1987

Orders
- See text

= Forcipulatacea =

Superorder of sea stars

The Forcipulatacea are a superorder of sea stars.

== Subdivision ==
- Order Forcipulatida
- Order Brisingida
- Incertae sedis:
  - Family Paulasteriidae
