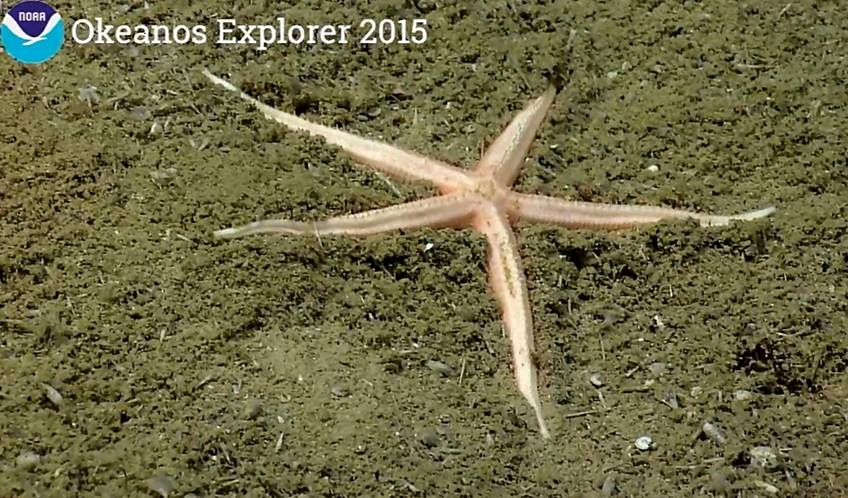
- Zoroaster fulgens

Scientific classification
- Kingdom: Animalia
- Phylum: Echinodermata
- Class: Asteroidea
- Order: Forcipulatida
- Family: Zoroasteridae; Sladen, 1889

Diversity
- 7 living genera, 35 species, See text.

= Zoroasteridae =

Family of starfishes

The Zoroasteridae are one of three families of Asteroidea (sea stars) in the order Forcipulatida. It contains seven living genera and one extinct genus.

== Genera ==
The living genera described are:

- Bythiolophus Fisher, 1916 (monotypic)
  - B. acanthinus Fisher, 1916
- Cnemidaster Sladen, 1889 (six species)
- Doraster Downey, 1970 (monotypic)
  - D. constellatus Downey, 1970
- Myxoderma Fisher, 1905 (five species)
- Pholidaster Sladen, 1889 (monotypic)
  - P. squamatus Sladen, 1889
- Sagenaster Mah, 2007 (monotypic)
  - S. evermanni (Fisher, 1905)
- Zoroaster Thomson, 1873 (20 species)

The extinct genus known is:

- Terminaster Hess, 1974†

== Distribution ==
Species in this family are widespread, distributed mainly in Pacific, Atlantic, and Indian Oceans. A few are found in the Arctic and Antarctic Oceans.
