= Quad =

Quad as a word or prefix usually means 4. It may refer to:

== Government ==
- Quadrilateral Security Dialogue, a strategic security dialogue between Australia, India, Japan, and the United States
- Quadrilateral group, an informal group that includes the trade spokesmen of the United States, Japan, Canada, and the European Union
- I2U2 Group, a strategic partnership between the United States, India, Israel, and United Arab Emirates; also known as the "Middle East Quad"
- Quad Cities, a group of five cities straddling the boundary between the U.S. states of Iowa and Illinois
- The "Quad", the senior members of the Cameron–Clegg coalition government in the United Kingdom from 2010 to 2015

== Art and entertainment ==
- Matthias Quad (1557–1613), engraver and cartographer working in Germany
- Quad (film), 2020
- Quad (music), a musical project by Gary Ramon
- Quad (play), by Samuel Beckett
- The Quad (TV series), 2017
- Quad (arts centre), in Derby, United Kingdom
- Quad Cinema, art house in New York City, New York
- Quad (studio), a Japanese animation studio

== Business ==
- Quad (company), an American marketing solutions company
- Quad Electroacoustics, a British manufacturer of audio equipment

== Medicine and anatomy ==
- Quadriplegic, a person paralyzed in all four limbs
- Quadriceps, a large leg muscle group
- Quadruplets, four children from a multiple birth

== Sports ==
- Quad (figure skating), a figure skating jump with four revolutions
- Quad scull, a boat configuration of four rowers
- Quad skates, roller skates with two wheels on each of two axles
- Quad, one of the divisions in wheelchair tennis
- Quadruple-double, a statistical accomplishment in basketball
- Quadrennium, the 4-year training cycle between Olympic games

== Transportation ==
- Quad bike or all-terrain vehicle, a light off-road vehicle
- Quad, a tandem bicycle with four seats
- Quadracycle, a four-wheeled human-powered land vehicle
- Jeffery Quad, a four-wheel drive truck
- Quadcopter, a four-rotor helicopter
- Quad, a chairlift in skiing which carries four persons
- Quad, or railroad speeder, a motorized vehicle used for maintenance on railroads
- Quad (rocket), an autonomous rocket by Armadillo Aerospace

== Technology ==
- QUAD (cipher), a stream cipher
- QUaD, a microwave telescope at the South Pole
- Quad antenna, a directional antenna
- Quadraphonic sound, four-channel sound
- Quadruplex videotape, video tape format
- Quad flat package, a type of package for surface mounted integrated circuits
- Star quad cable, four insulated conductors twisted together

== Other uses ==
- Quad (unit), unit of energy, short for quadrillion, 10^{15} BTU
- Quad (geography), a United States Geological Survey topographical map
- Quad (typography), a spacer used in letterpress type
- Quad poster, a common UK size of film poster
- Quadrangle (architecture), a space or courtyard bordered by buildings
- Quadrat, in ecology, a small study area or a frame used to define it
- Quadrilateral, in geometry
- Quadrupel, a Belgian beer
- Quadruple combination, the four books that comprise the canon of the LDS church
- The Quad Casino (now The Linq), on the Las Vegas Strip
- Four-of-a-kind in poker
- Sako Quad, a Finnish bolt-action rifle
- Morris C8, a WWII era artillery tractor

== See also ==
- Quadrangle (disambiguation)
