= Paulasterias mcclaini =

Scientific classification
- Kingdom: Animalia
- Phylum: Echinodermata
- Class: Asteroidea
- Family: Paulasteriidae
- Genus: Paulasterias
- Species: P. mcclaini

Binomial name
- Paulasterias mcclaini Mah et al., 2015

Species of starfish

Paulasterias mcclaini is a species of starfish in the family Paulasteriidae. It is found in deep water at hydrothermal vents.

== Taxonomy ==
This species was collected by the marine biologist Craig McClain and first described by echinoderm specialist Christopher Mah in 2015, being named Paulasterias mcclaini in honour of its finder. Along with its sister species Paulasterias tyleri, also found at hydrothermal vents, it differed markedly from other known starfish species, so the new family Paulasteriidae in the superorder Forcipulatacea was created to accommodate the two species. They are the first starfish species known from hydrothermal vents.

== Description ==
Paulasterias mcclaini is a six-armed starfish with slender tapering arms. Larger specimens have a thick fleshy skin on the aboral (upper) surface, with spongy tissue underneath, which conceals the dermal plates. It is a pink starfish, covered with short spines.

== Distribution and habitat ==
This starfish was found as part of the assemblage of animals forming a community on the seabed at a deep sea hydrothermal vent in the Northeast Pacific off the coast of Washington and Oregon. It is found on rock, lava flows, mud and even clay.

== Ecology ==
Starfish are unable to cope with the hot, sulphurous, toxic environment of the hydrothermal vent itself but they are present in the cooler, cleaner water nearby. Hoff crabs live adjacent to the hydrothermal vent chimneys, with gastropod molluscs and then goose barnacles occupying zones further out. Beyond this is an assemblage dominated by sea anemones, and it is on these and on the goose barnacles that the starfish probably feed.
