= Sea star-associated densovirus =

Virus classification
- (unranked): Virus
- Realm: Floreoviria
- Kingdom: Shotokuvirae
- Phylum: Cossaviricota
- Class: Quintoviricetes
- Order: Piccovirales
- Family: Parvoviridae
- Genus: Aquambidensovirus
- Species: Asteroid aquambidensovirus 1

Species of virus

Sea star-associated densovirus (SSaDV) belongs to the Parvoviridae family. Like the other members of its family, it is a single-stranded DNA virus. SSaDV has been suggested to be an etiological agent of sea star wasting disease, but conclusive evidence has not yet been obtained. Further work in 2018 and 2020 re-examined the association between SSaDV and sea star wasting and found no evidence in both the original work and subsequent surveys of sea stars. More recently, densoviruses associated with echinoderms were recognized as forming persistent infections in their hosts and become endogenized within sea star genomic DNA. Densoviruses including SSaDV become more pronounced during sea star wasting progression, but no single strain is associated with sea star wasting disease.

== Epidemiology ==
SSaDV occurs in sea stars from southern Alaska to Baja California. It tends to occur during large outbreaks of starfish-afflicting diseases with high mortality rates, as it has in 1972, 1978, 2013, and 2014. See Sea star wasting disease. The virus was observed in wasting Pycnopodia helianthoides, and detected in small quantities in healthy sea stars and aquarium sediments. The highest viral load was found in the body wall of the central disk. A similar virus infecting sea stars on the Atlantic Coast of North America is found in only healthy specimens. As of 2021, SSaDV is no longer believed to be associated with sea star wasting disease but may rather be one of many viruses that replicate as a consequence of disease process.

== Structure ==
The genomic characteristics of SSaDV are similar to the other members of the genus Ambidensovirus. It is predicted to be a non-enveloped icosahedral particle at ~25 nm, although the virus has never been imaged.

== See also ==
- Sea star wasting disease
