= The Quadrangle (Antarctica) =

Coordinates: 71°35′S 68°36′W

The Quadrangle is an ice-covered area (essentially a glacial cirque) enclosed on three sides by rock ridges, but open to the south, lying between Mount Umbriel and Venus Glacier in eastern Alexander Island, Antarctica. The Quadrangle was first mapped by the Directorate of Overseas Surveys from satellite imagery supplied by the U.S. National Aeronautics and Space Administration (NASA) in cooperation with the U.S. Geological Survey. The feature was so named by the United Kingdom Antarctic Place-Names Committee in description of its shape.
