= Paulasterias tyleri =

Scientific classification
- Kingdom: Animalia
- Phylum: Echinodermata
- Class: Asteroidea
- Family: Paulasteriidae
- Genus: Paulasterias
- Species: P. tyleri

Binomial name
- Paulasterias tyleri Mah et al., 2015

Species of starfish

Paulasterias tyleri is a species of starfish in the family Paulasteriidae. It is found in deep water at hydrothermal vents in the Antarctic. It is the type species of the newly erected genus Paulasterias, the only other member of the genus being Paulasterias mcclaini.

== History ==
Paulasterias tyleri was discovered during a deep sea research cruise organized by the National Oceanography Centre. It was the first starfish to be found living as part of a hydrothermal vent community and was not closely related to any known starfish species so that it was placed in a new family. Its nearest living relative lives in the Ross Sea on the other side of the Antarctic continent some two thousand miles away.

== Description ==
Paulasterias tyleri is a seven-armed starfish and is whitish or pale pink. It has a thick fleshy skin on the aboral (upper) surface, with spongy tissue underneath it. The skin is rough, being clad with short spines.

== Distribution ==
Paulasterias tyleri is found at thermal vents in the East Scotia Ridge to the east of the southern tip of South America where the depth is about 2,500 m (8,200 ft).

== Ecology ==
Starfish are unable to cope with the hot, sulphurous, toxic environment of the hydrothermal vent itself but they are present in the cooler, cleaner water nearby. Hoff crabs live adjacent to the hydrothermal vent chimneys, with gastropod molluscs and then goose barnacles occupying zones further out. Beyond this is an assemblage dominated by sea anemones, and it is on these and on the goose barnacles that the starfish probably feed. Other members of the community surrounding the vents include limpets in the genus Eclipidrilus and sea spiders in the genus Sericosura. However absent from these vents are the giant tube worms (Riftia pachyptila) which dominate other hydrothermal vents.
