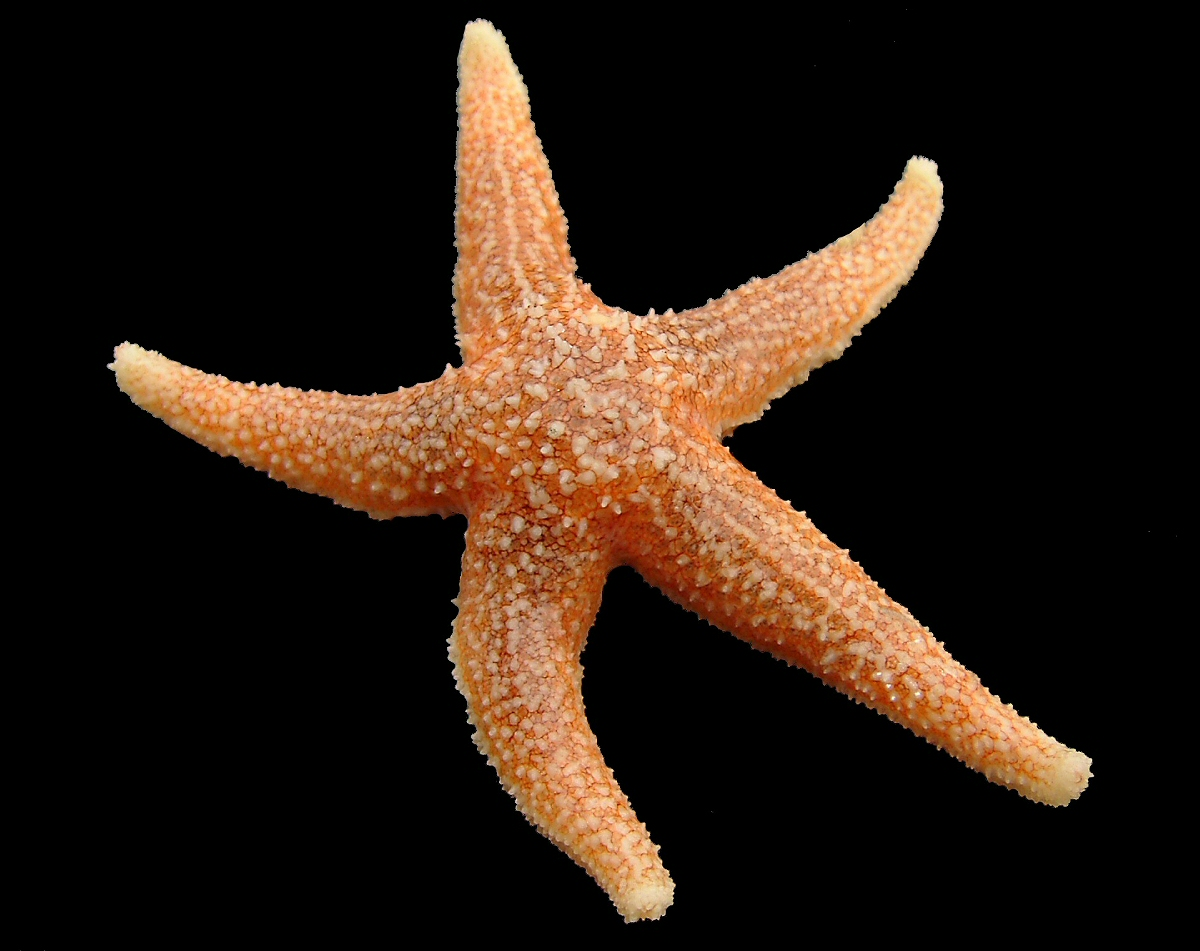
- Asterias rubens

Scientific classification
- Domain: Eukaryota
- Kingdom: Animalia
- Phylum: Echinodermata
- Class: Asteroidea
- Superorder: Forcipulatacea
- Order: Forcipulatida

Families
- See Text

= Forcipulatida =

Order of sea stars

The Forcipulatida are an order of sea stars, containing three families and 49 genera.

== Description ==
Forcipulatids share with the brisingid sea stars distinctive pedicellariae, consisting of a short stalk with three skeletal ossicles. Unlike that group, however, the forcipulatids tend to have more robust bodies. The order includes some well-known species, such as the common starfish, Asterias rubens. This order can be commonly found from North Carolina in the United States all the way to Santos in Brazil.

== Phylogeny ==
The order is divided into three families:

- Family Asteriidae — 39 genera
- Family Heliasteridae — two genera
- Family Zoroasteridae — eight genera

World Register of Marine Species gives another taxonomy, with 7 families and 64 genera:

- Family Asteriidae Gray, 1840
- Family Heliasteridae Viguier, 1878
- Family Pedicellasteridae Perrier, 1884
- Family Pycnopodiidae Fisher, 1928
- Family Stichasteridae Perrier, 1885
- Family Zoroasteridae Sladen, 1889

A 2020 study involving phylogenetic analysis and scanning electron microscopy of the skeleton and ossicles of taxa from the superorder Forcipulatacea recovered Asteriidae, Stichasteridae, Zoroasteridae, and Brisingida as monophyletic.

The extinct family Terminasteridae has also been placed in this order.

== See also ==
- Paulasterias mcclaini
- Paulasterias tyleri
