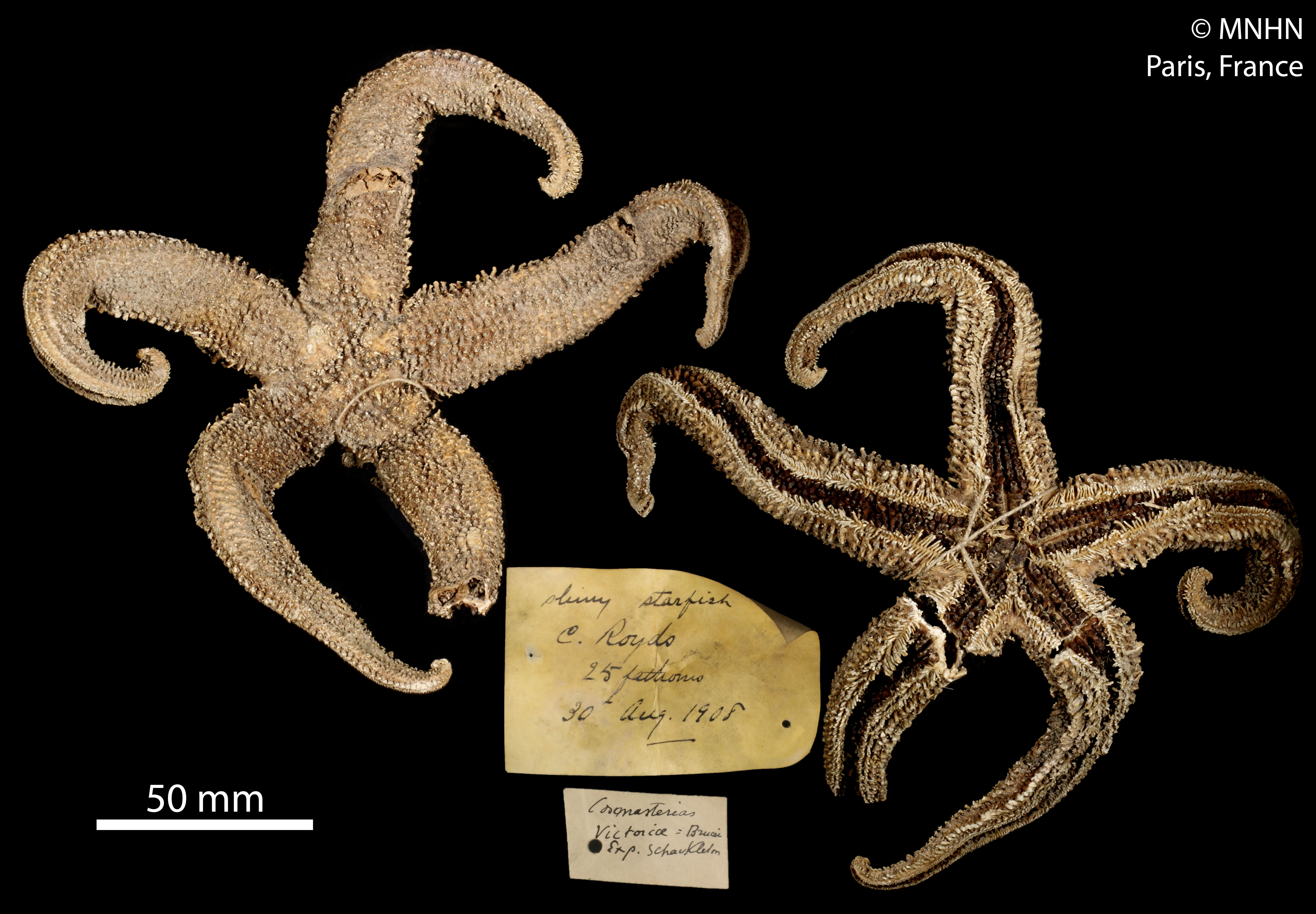

Scientific classification
- Kingdom: Animalia
- Phylum: Echinodermata
- Class: Asteroidea
- Order: Forcipulatida
- Family: Asteriidae
- Genus: Diplasterias
- Species: D. brucei

Binomial name
- Diplasterias brucei (Koehler, 1908)

Synonyms
- Coscinasterias brucei (Koehler, 1908); Coscinasterias victoriae Koehler, 1911; Diplasterias fochi Fisher, 1930; Podasterias brucei (Koehler, 1908); Podasterias fochi Koehler, 1920

= Diplasterias brucei =

Species of starfish

Diplasterias brucei is a species of starfish in the family Asteriidae. It is found in the Pacific Ocean and Southern Ocean. It is a predator and scavenger and is unusual among starfish in that it broods its young.

== Description ==
Diplasterias brucei usually has five arms, but in the vicinity of South Georgia, a six-armed form is common. This starfish varies in colour from a pale bluish-green to a yellowish or orange hue. The maximum size is about 25 cm (10 in) across.

== Distribution ==
Diplasterias brucei is found in the Pacific Ocean and Southern Ocean. In Antarctica, the species is found on the seabed in the Antarctic Peninsula and in East Antarctica, at depths down to about 725 m (2,400 ft).

== Ecology ==
Diplasterias brucei is one of the more conspicuous animals in the zone deeper than 33 m (110 ft) which is the lower limit for anchor ice formation. This zone is characterised by a layer of sponge spicules and dead mollusc shells a metre or more thick, swathed in living sponges. This matrix is a biodiverse environment rich in sea anemones, polychaete worms, hydroids, bryozoans and molluscs. The bivalve mollusc Limatula hodgsoni is particularly common and there are also great quantities of tiny gastropod molluscs in the genera Onoba and Margarella.

The starfishes Acodontaster conspicuus, Acodontaster hodgsoni, Odontaster meridionalis and Perknaster fuscus feed on the sponges, while Odontaster validus mostly scavenges, and D. brucei and the gastropod Trophonella longstaffi both feed on the bivalve L. hodgsoni. D. brucei primarily feeds on molluscs, but does not seem to eat sponges as do many other starfish. It is sometimes preyed on by the sea anemone Urticinopsis antarctica. Developing embryos of this species are brooded by the female until they have developed into juvenile starfish.

The starfish O. validus is an omnivorous predator and scavenger in Antarctic waters, a keystone species feeding on almost anything organic with which it comes in contact, including other species of starfish. However, O validus avoids the brooded embryos of D. brucei, which contain secondary metabolites which act as a deterrent. This is of importance in a species that takes a long time to develop in the cold waters which it inhabits.
