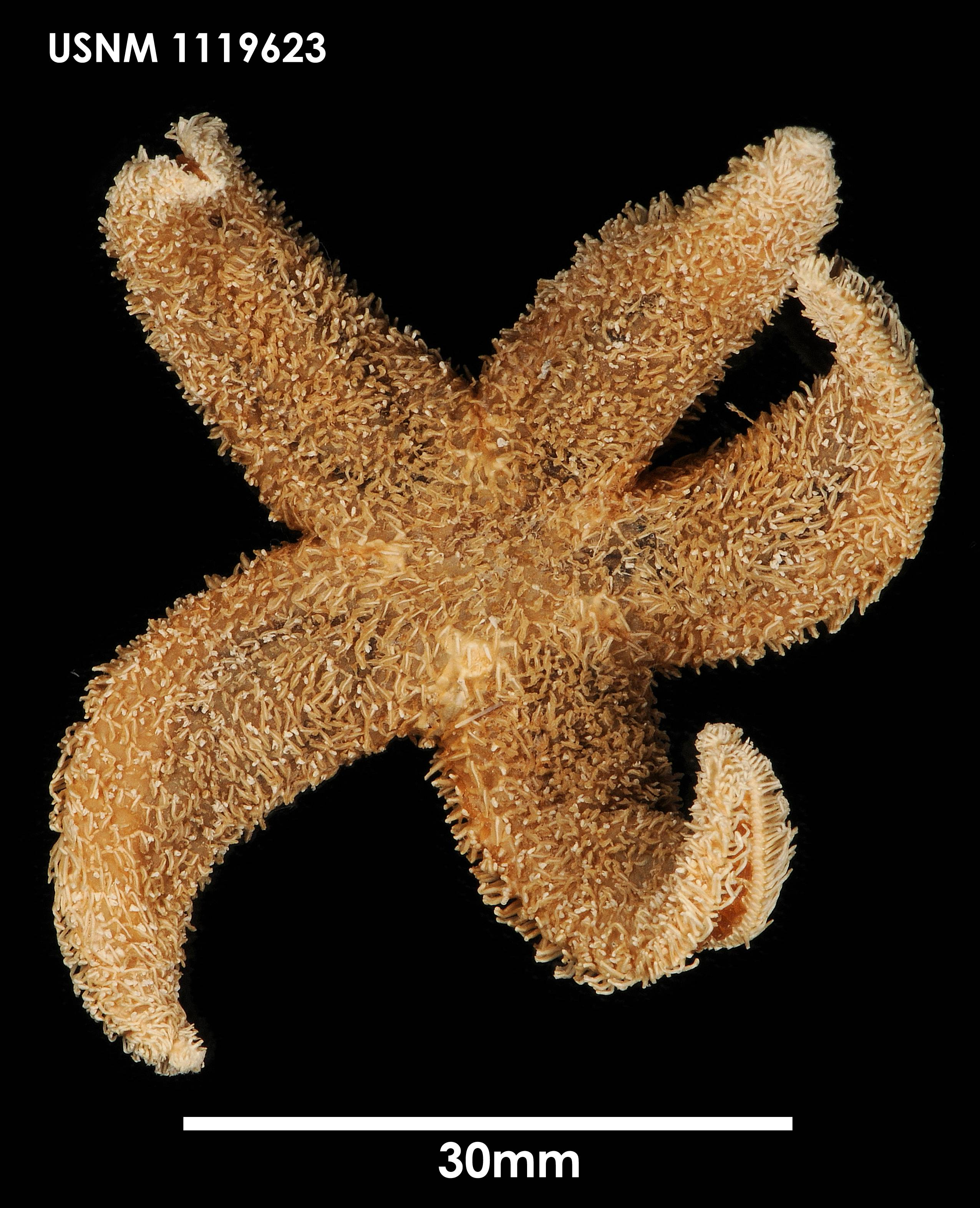
- Adelasterias papillosa

Scientific classification
- Kingdom: Animalia
- Phylum: Echinodermata
- Class: Asteroidea
- Order: Forcipulatida
- Family: Asteriidae
- Genus: Adelasterias; Verrill, 1914

= Adelasterias =

Genus of starfish

Adelasterias is a genus of starfish in the family Asteriidae, first described by Verrill in 1914. It has a single species, Adelasterias papillosa (Koehler, 1906).

== Species ==
The genus contains a single species, Adelasterias papillosa, named by René Koehler in 1906 for its many papillae, or protuberances. Koehler originally assigned it to Diplasterias.
