= Coronaster eclipes =

Scientific classification
- Kingdom: Animalia
- Phylum: Echinodermata
- Class: Asteroidea
- Order: Forcipulatida
- Family: Asteriidae
- Genus: Coronaster
- Species: C. eclipes

Binomial name
- Coronaster eclipes Fisher, 1925

Species of starfish

Coronaster eclipes is a species of starfish in the genus Coronaster described by Walter Kenrick Fisher in 1925.

== Distribution ==
Coronaster eclipes is found in Hawaii.
