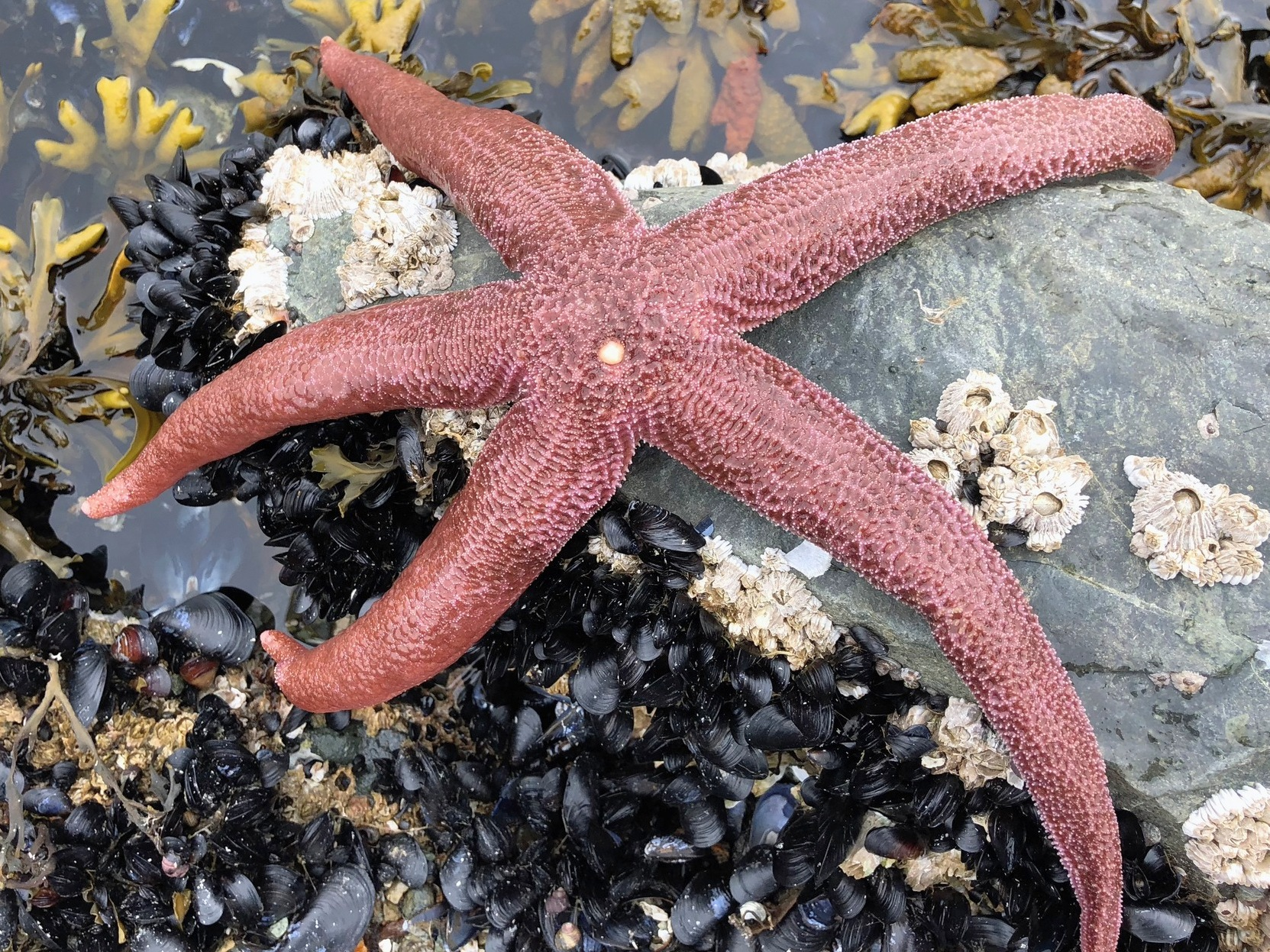
- Evasterias echinosoma located in the Aleutians, Alaska, United States

Scientific classification
- Kingdom: Animalia
- Phylum: Echinodermata
- Class: Asteroidea
- Order: Forcipulatida
- Family: Asteriidae
- Genus: Evasterias
- Species: E. echinosoma

Binomial name
- Evasterias echinosoma Fisher, 1926

= Evasterias echinosoma =

Species of starfish

Evasterias echinosoma is a species of starfish in the family Asteriidae. It is native to Alaska and Russia.
