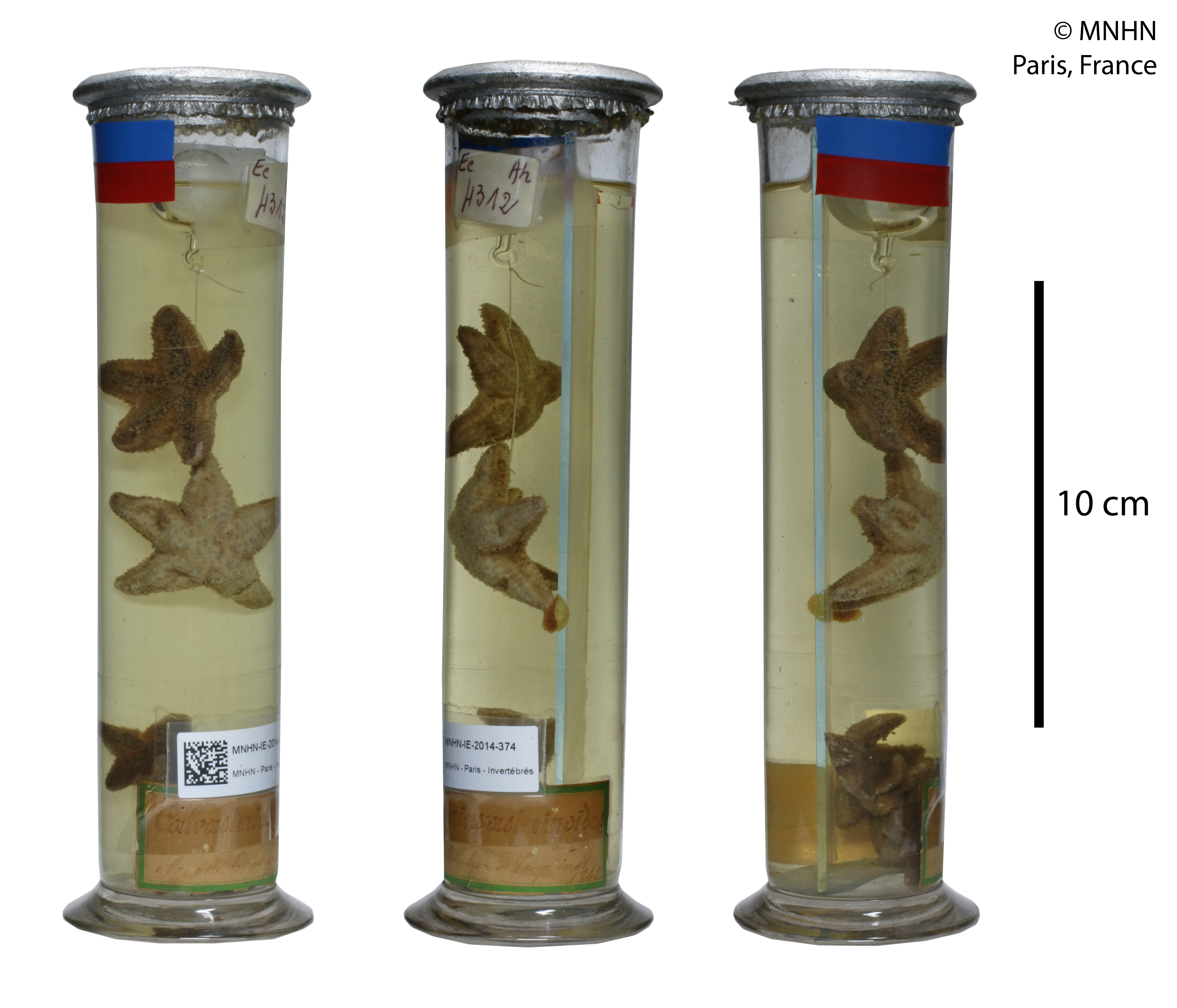

Scientific classification
- Kingdom: Animalia
- Phylum: Echinodermata
- Class: Asteroidea
- Order: Forcipulatida
- Family: Asteriidae
- Genus: Anasterias
- Species: A. asterinoides

Binomial name
- Anasterias asterinoides Perrier, 1875

= Anasterias asterinoides =

Species of starfish

Anasterias asterinoides is a species of starfish in the genus Anasterias that was discovered by Edmond Perrier in 1875. It is found in marine waters off the coast of Argentina.
