= Anasterias antipodium =

Scientific classification
- Kingdom: Animalia
- Phylum: Echinodermata
- Class: Asteroidea
- Order: Forcipulatida
- Family: Asteriidae
- Genus: Anasterias
- Species: A. antipodium

Binomial name
- Anasterias antipodium (Bell, 1882)

Synonyms
- Calvasterias antipodum (Bell, 1882)

Species of starfish

Anasterias antipodium is a species of starfish in the genus Anasterias. It was described by F.J. Bell in 1882.

A. antipodium was discovered in New Zealand. However, related species are found in intertidal zones and waters up to 190 meters deep, where they live on rocks, boulders, and in kelp forests.
