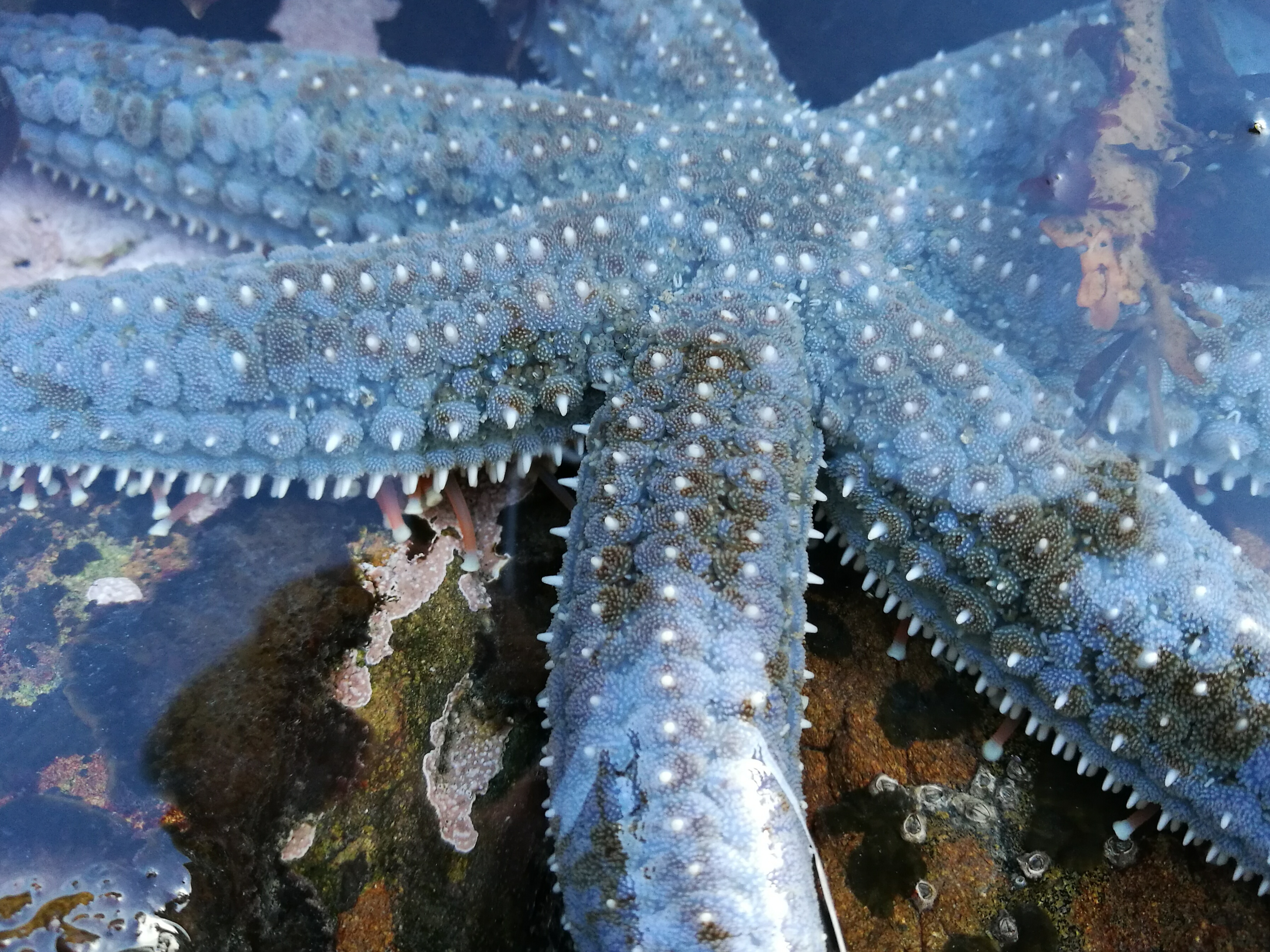
- Astrostole scabra

Scientific classification
- Kingdom: Animalia
- Phylum: Echinodermata
- Class: Asteroidea
- Order: Forcipulatida
- Family: Asteriidae
- Genus: Astrostole
- Species: A. scabra

Binomial name
- Astrostole scabra Hutton, 1872

= Astrostole scabra =

Species of starfish

Astrostole scabra, commonly called the seven-armed starfish, is a sea star in the family Asteriidae, native to New Zealand, eastern Australia and southern Australia. A frequent inhabitant of the intertidal zone also seen attached to wharf piles, it is among the larger sea-stars found in New Zealand. Adults often prey on mussels, forcing the shells open by applying pressure for long periods with the tube feet.

== Description ==
With a diameter of up to 350mm in subtidal forms, the colouration of A. scabra varies from orange through dark red to brown, or light blue to grey. The dorsal surface is covered in speckled plates, from the center of which protrude one or two short, stubby white spines which are specialised ossicles. These spines are blunt on top, becoming sharper and sometimes longer on the sides of the arms. Spines can appear blue in juveniles.

The madreporite is not obvious. Tube feet are a combination of off-white and bright orange.

Intertidal individuals are generally smaller with thicker dermal plates, allowing them greater protection when being tossed about by waves. Despite this they are still found to be more damaged than subtidal individuals.

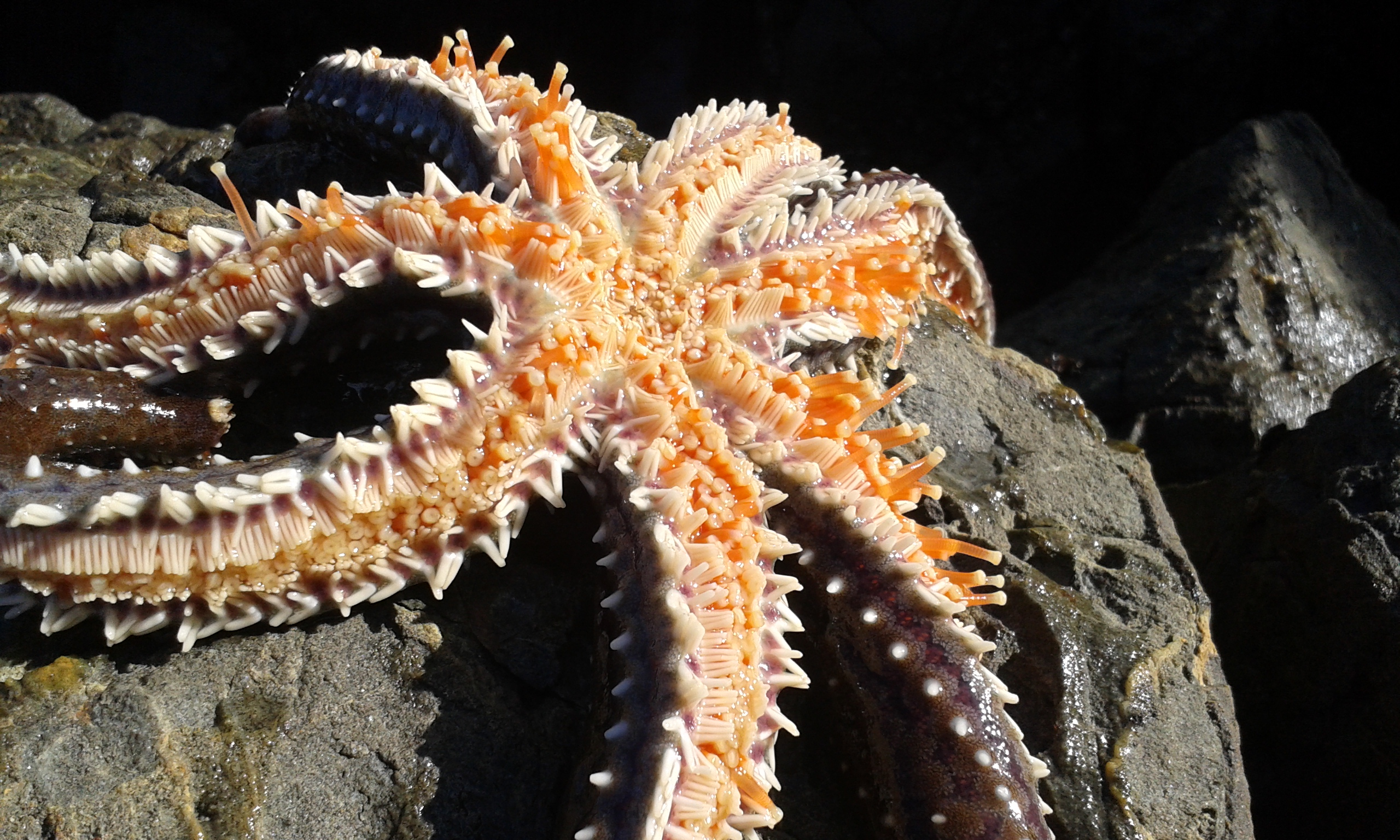
A scabra showing ventral surface and tube feet

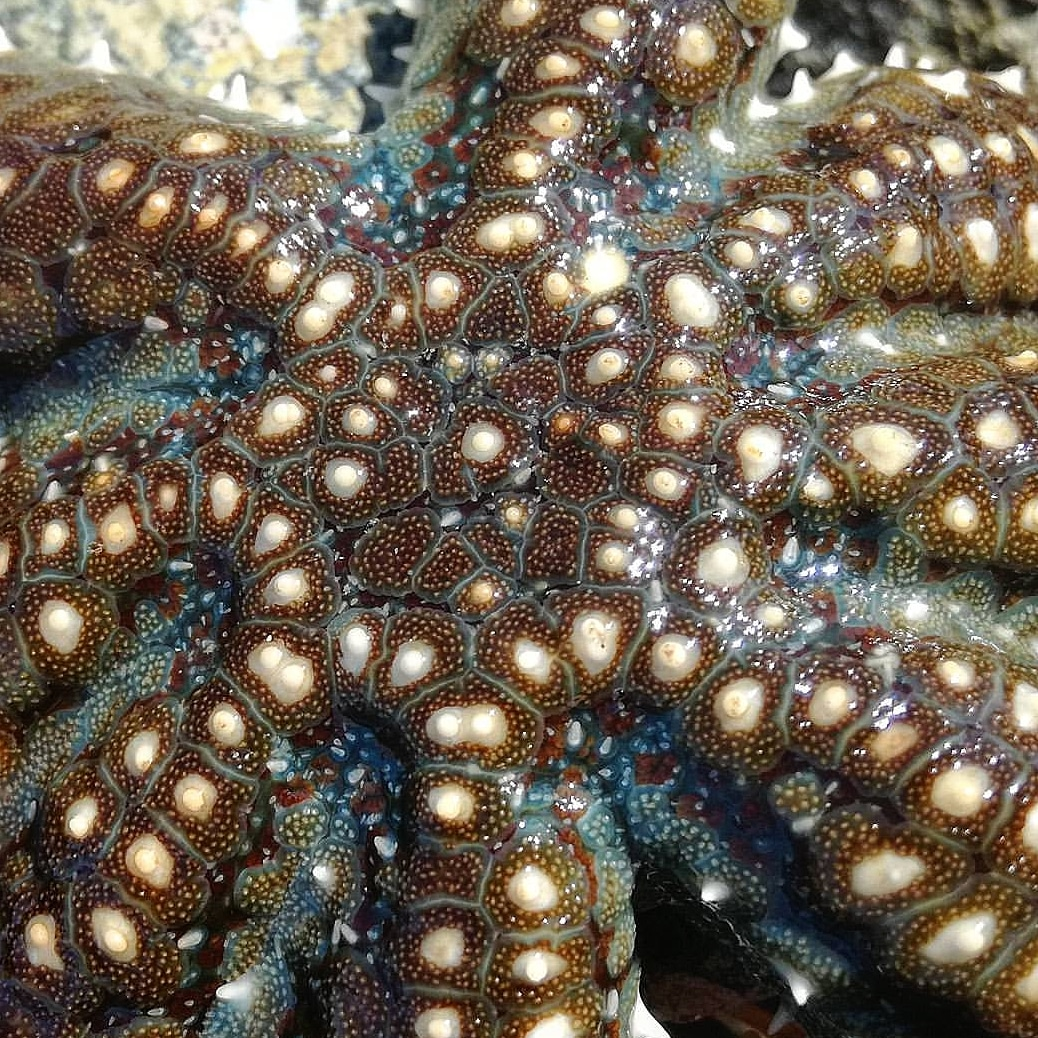
Aboral surface of central disc and arms showing single and double spines (ossicles), this specimen has an eighth arm

== Habitat ==
A common inhabitant of the rocky reef subtidal or the rocky shore intertidal, adult seven-armed seastars have been found down to 150m. A. scabra has unique roaming habits – there is never a permanent home. Therefore, migratory and resident A. scabra in a location all result from random movement. Juveniles are more adventurous than adults in the coastal intertidal - they show considerable movement patterns within the intertidal and shallow sublittoral zones, not venturing beyond 20m in depth.

== Breeding ==
Sexual maturity is achieved when there is a decrease in overall ossicle (endoskeleton) thickness with a simultaneous radial increase to at least 110mm. A. scabra can undergo both sexual and asexual (fissiparous) processes of reproduction. Environmental influences induce gametogenesis and gamete maturation, with water temperature a major factor. Offspring disperse through the means of larval transport or epiplanktontic drift (drift occurring between the surface and 100m in depth). This free dispersal reduces local intraspecific competition as local currents carry gametes away from the spawn site. Spawning occurs throughout late August and early September, or when plankton richness is at a local maximum. Larvae are planktotropic.

== Diet ==
For A. scabra, individual size relates to diet composition (larger predators eat larger prey). J. C. Town (1981) found a population feeding on species of 60 different genera. Highest feeding frequencies are shown in individuals in the radius range of 10-29mm, with peaks of activity in the months of May and June. Those in the 50-89mm radius range have an eating frequency more constant than all other sizes. Not only is the frequency of foraging larger in small individuals, they also eat larger portion sizes.

There are shifts in dietary composition as the species increases in size. In specimens of 10-19mm radii, rissoid and eatoniellid molluscs compose 46% of the food source, with trochids and chitons a mere 10%. However, for specimens with a radius of 30-39mm, rissoids and eatoniellids only contribute 2.6% of the diet, and chitons constitute 21%. Rissoids and eatoniellids are a minor food source for all A. scabra of radius 29mm-89mm, and are completely absent from the diet of individuals with radius >89mm. Chitons and trochids remain in the diet until radius exceeds 159mm. Increased radii coincides with an increase in spiral-shell gastropod and chiton consumption. These types of prey would normally be too large for a small seastar to consume. This change in diet is vital to survival and longevity because it results in little to no competition between individuals of different sizes, and may be a considerable factor in the ecological success of this starfish.
