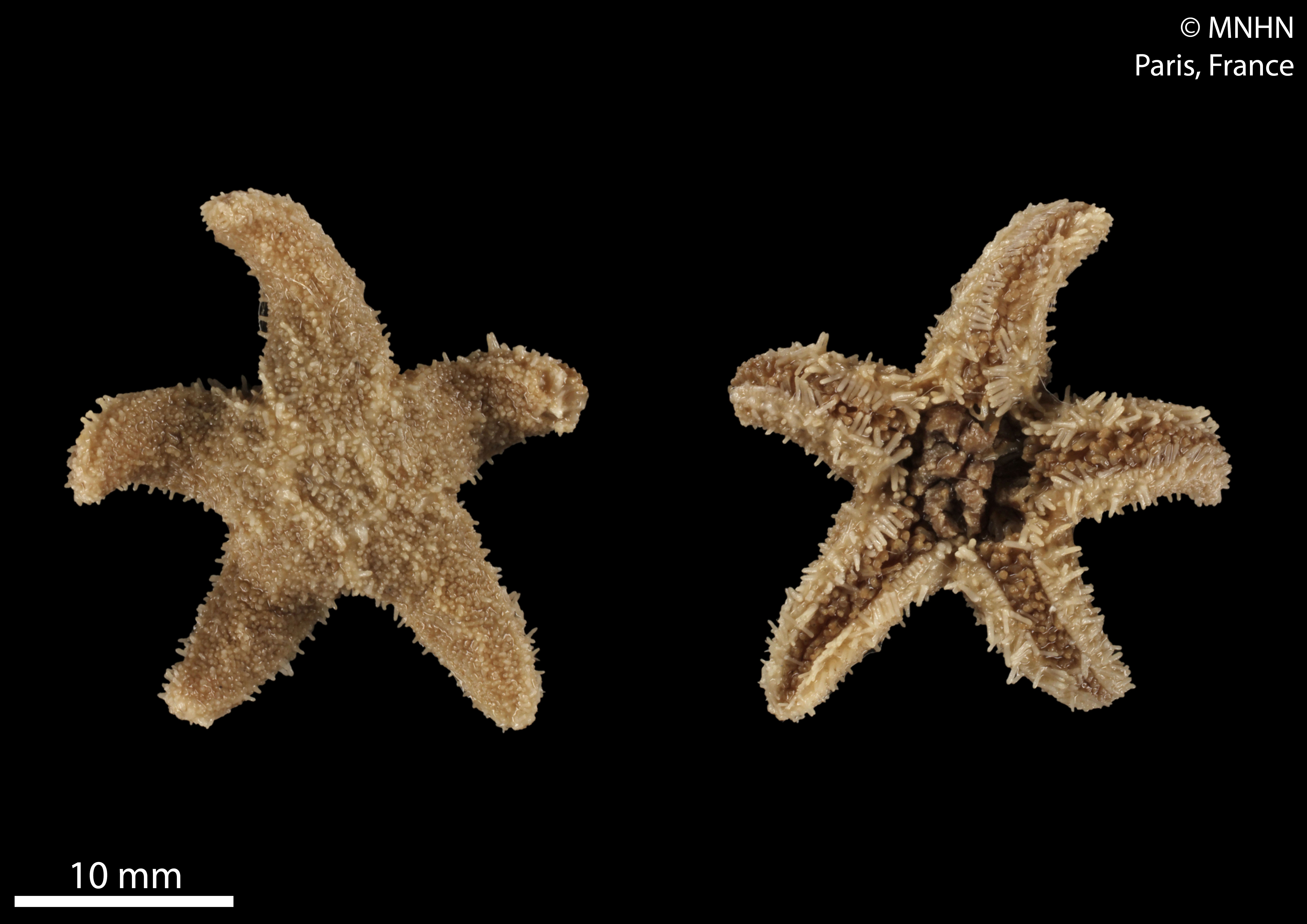

Scientific classification
- Kingdom: Animalia
- Phylum: Echinodermata
- Class: Asteroidea
- Order: Forcipulatida
- Family: Asteriidae
- Genus: Anasterias
- Species: A. antarctica

Binomial name
- Anasterias antarctica (Lütken, 1857)

Synonyms
- Anasterias minuta Perrier, 1875; Asteracanthion antarcticus Lütken, 1857; Asterias antarctica Studer, 1884; Asterias cunninghami Perrier, 1875; Asterias hyadesi Perrier, 1886; Asterias rugispina Stimpson, 1862; Eremasterias antarctica (Koehler, 1917); Sporasterias antarctica (Lütken, 1857); Sporasterias rugispina Perrier, 1896

= Anasterias antarctica =

Species of starfish

Anasterias antarctica, commonly called the Cinderella starfish, is a species of starfish in the family Asteriidae. It is found in coastal waters in the Southern Ocean and around Antarctica.

== Description ==
This starfish has a maximum arm length of 96 mm (3.8 in).

== Distribution and habitat ==
Anasterias antarctica is found in the Southern Ocean and the waters around Antarctica. It is native to Argentina, the Falkland Islands and southern Chile, and several islands in the Southern Ocean. Its depth range is from the intertidal zone down to about 190 m (600 ft), its typical habitat being on rocks, boulders and pebbles and in forests of giant kelp.

== Ecology ==
Anasterias antarctica is a predator and scavenger. Its diet includes isopods (Sphaeromatidae), gastropod molluscs including Pareuthria spp., bivalve molluscs, chitons and barnacles. Larger starfish take larger prey. It is the dominant predator in the tidal and shallow subtidal zones of the Falkland Islands.

A study of the community in the Beagle Channel associated with the giant kelp Macrocystis pyrifera showed A. antarctica as being at the top trophic level, feeding on the herbivores grazing on the seaweed, on the filter feeders, on the other predators in the community and on the detritivores.

Breeding takes place between March and July, with the developing embryos being brooded by the parent. Fecundity ranges between 52 and 363 eggs and the highest proportion of females are brooding during May and June. The adult feeds most intensely before and after the brooding period but fasts while brooding; however, adults that are brooding a small number of embryos sometimes feed while brooding. The juveniles are released between September and November, larger ones departing first while smaller ones remain. A 2 mm (0.08 in) juvenile will grow to around 10 mm (0.4 in) in a year. There is some seasonal vertical migration of this species, with larger individuals being found at greater depths and smaller individuals seldom being deeper than 10 m (33 ft) in winter.
