= Coronaster halicepus =

Scientific classification
- Kingdom: Animalia
- Phylum: Echinodermata
- Class: Asteroidea
- Order: Forcipulatida
- Family: Asteriidae
- Genus: Coronaster
- Species: C. halicepus

Binomial name
- Coronaster halicepus Fisher, 1917

Species of starfish

Coronaster halicepus is a species of starfish in the genus Coronaster described by Walter Kenrick Fisher in 1917.

== Distributions ==
New Zealand and the Philippines.
