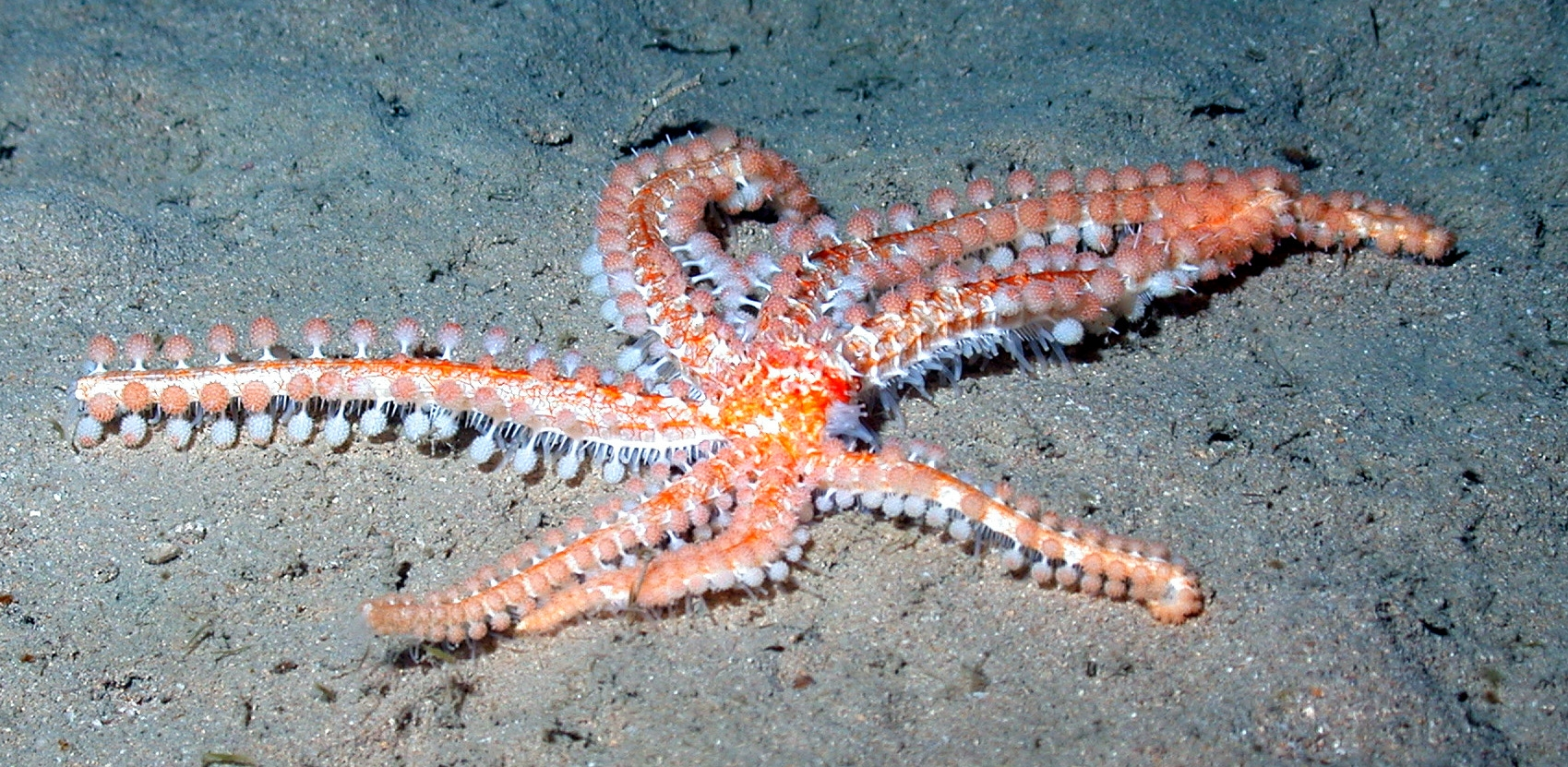

Scientific classification
- Kingdom: Animalia
- Phylum: Echinodermata
- Class: Asteroidea
- Order: Forcipulatida
- Family: Asteriidae
- Genus: Coronaster
- Species: C. briareus

Binomial name
- Coronaster briareus (Verrill, 1882)

Synonyms
- Asterias briareus Verrill, 1882; Asterias volsellatus Nutting, 1895; Coronaster brisingoides Perrier, 1884; Coronaster parfaiti Perrier, 1895

= Coronaster briareus =

Species of starfish

Coronaster briareus is a species of starfish in the family Asteriidae. It moves quickly and can reach a size of nearly 30 cm. As a defense mechanism, it can shed its legs, which later regenerate. This species is well-established in the Maltese waters.
