= Anasterias directa =

Scientific classification
- Kingdom: Animalia
- Phylum: Echinodermata
- Class: Asteroidea
- Order: Forcipulatida
- Family: Asteriidae
- Genus: Anasterias
- Species: A. directa

Binomial name
- Anasterias directa (Kohler, 1920)

Species of starfish

Anasterias directa is a species of starfish in the genus Anasterias that was discovered by René Koehler in 1920. It mainly lives in the South Pacific Ocean and the Antarctic Ocean.
