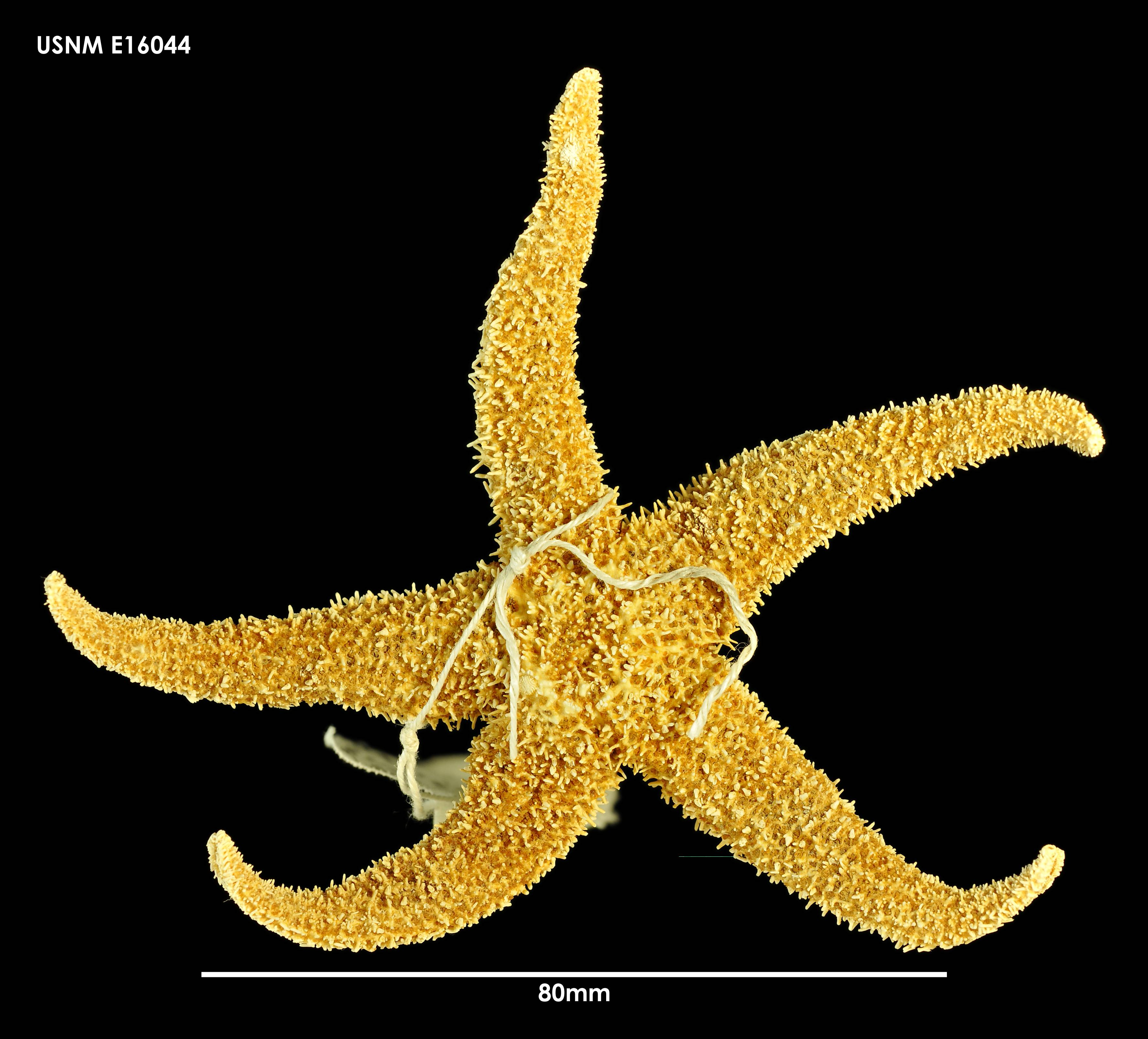

Scientific classification
- Kingdom: Animalia
- Phylum: Echinodermata
- Class: Asteroidea
- Order: Forcipulatida
- Family: Asteriidae
- Genus: Anasterias
- Species: A. pedicellaris

Binomial name
- Anasterias pedicellaris (Koehler, 1923)

Synonyms
- Notasterias pedicellaris

= Anasterias pedicellaris =

Species of starfish

Anasterias pedicellaris is a species of starfish in the genus Anasterias discovered by René Koehler in 1923. It's found in the Antarctic region, in the Falkland Islands.
