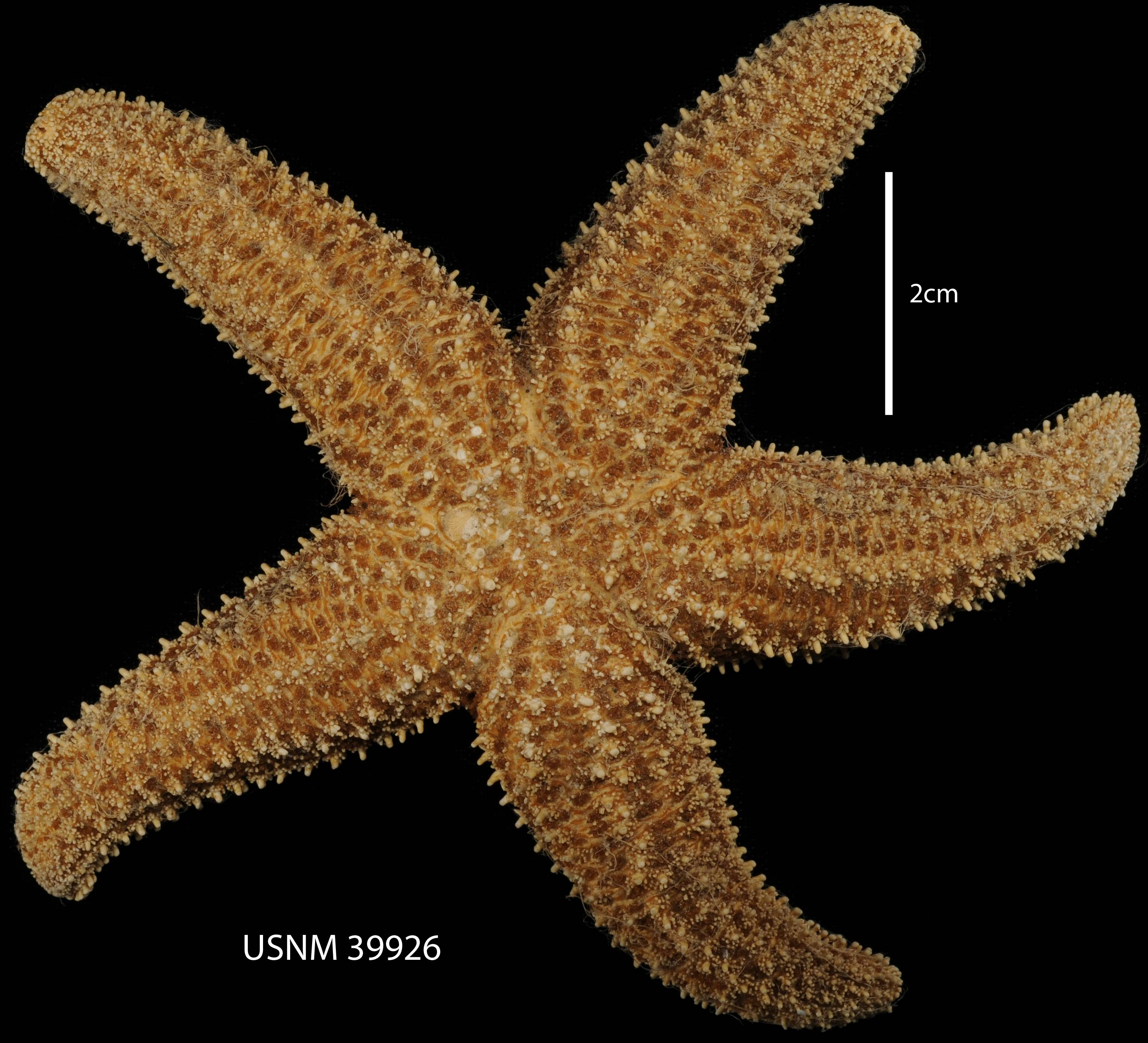

Scientific classification
- Kingdom: Animalia
- Phylum: Echinodermata
- Class: Asteroidea
- Order: Forcipulatida
- Family: Asteriidae
- Genus: Anasterias
- Species: A. spirabilis

Binomial name
- Anasterias spirabilis (Koheler, 1920)

= Anasterias spirabilis =

Species of starfish

Anasterias spirabilis is a species of starfish in the genus Anasterias discovered by F.J. Bell in 1881. It can be found in the Antarctic and sub-Antarctic waters.
