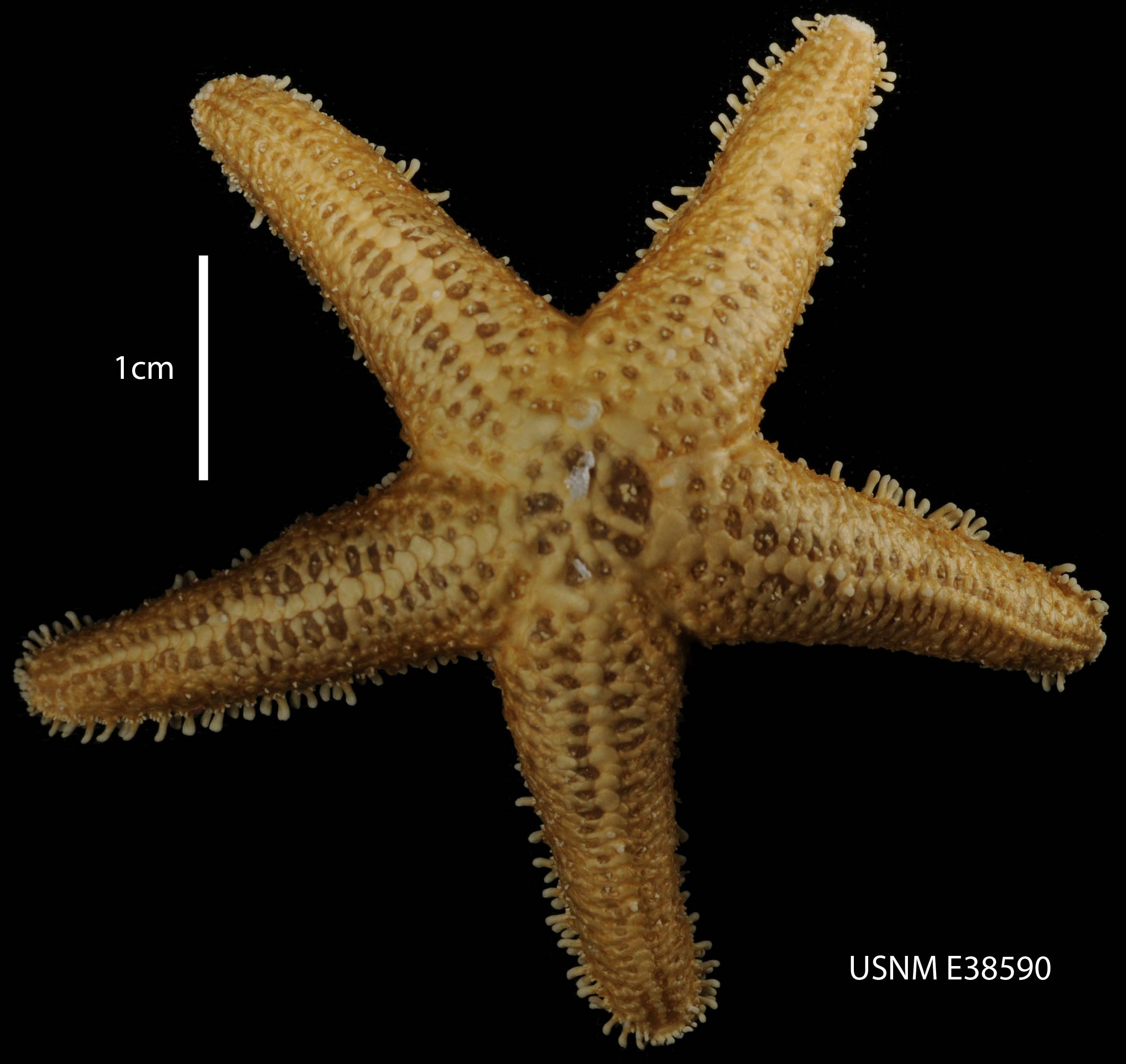

Scientific classification
- Kingdom: Animalia
- Phylum: Echinodermata
- Class: Asteroidea
- Order: Forcipulatida
- Family: Asteriidae
- Genus: Anasterias
- Species: A. laevigata

Binomial name
- Anasterias laevigata (Hutton, 1879)

= Anasterias laevigata =

Species of starfish

Anasterias laevigata is a species of starfish in the genus Anasterias that was discovered by Frederick W. Hutton in 1879. It can be found in places in New Zealand, such as Tagua Bay, under stones at low tide.
