= Limatula hodgsoni =

Scientific classification
- Kingdom: Animalia
- Phylum: Mollusca
- Class: Bivalvia
- Order: Limida
- Family: Limidae
- Genus: Limatula
- Species: L. hodgsoni

Binomial name
- Limatula hodgsoni (E. A. Smith, 1907)

Synonyms
- Lima hodgsoni E. A. Smith, 1907; Limatula (Antarctolima) hodgsoni (E. A. Smith, 1907); Limatula closei Hedley, 1916

Species of bivalve

Limatula hodgsoni is a species of bivalve mollusc in the family Limidae, the file shells or file clams. It is native to the seas around Antarctica.

== Description ==
Limatula hodgsoni grows to a length of 27 mm (1.1 in), a height of 35 mm (1.4 in) and a diameter of 20 mm (0.8 in). The shell is white, oblong, thin, narrow above and somewhat convex; the posterior side is less curved than the anterior. The umbones are central and the ligament area is narrow and diamond-shaped. The valves are sculpted by 30 to 35 squamate ribs separated by grooves slightly narrower than the ribs. The ribs are finely marked by the annual growth lines.

== Distribution ==
Limatula hodgsoni is found on the seabed of the waters around Antarctica at depths down to at least 769 m (2,500 ft). It is very common in the zone deeper than 33 m (110 ft) which is the lower limit for anchor ice formation. In some areas, this zone is characterised by a layer of sponge spicules and dead mollusc shells a metre or more thick, overgrown by living sponges. This matrix is a biodiverse habitat rich in sea anemones, polychaete worms, hydroids, bryozoans and molluscs. Limatula hodgsoni is the most abundant bivalve mollusc in this habitat and is preyed on by the starfishes Odontaster validus and Diplasterias brucei.
