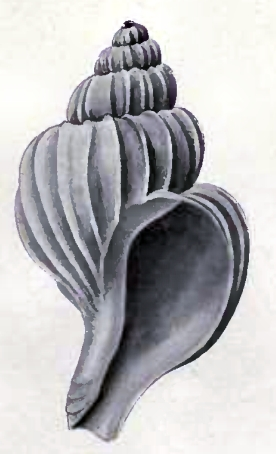
- Apertural view of a shell of Trophonella longstaffi

Scientific classification
- Kingdom: Animalia
- Phylum: Mollusca
- Class: Gastropoda
- Subclass: Caenogastropoda
- Order: Neogastropoda
- Family: Muricidae
- Subfamily: Pagodulinae
- Genus: Trophonella; Harasewych & Pastorino, 2010

Type species
- Trophon scotianus Powell, 1951

= Trophonella =

Genus of gastropods

Trophonella is a genus of sea snails, marine gastropod mollusks in the family Muricidae, the murex snails or rock snails.

== Species ==
Species within the genus Trophonella include:

- Trophonella echinolamellata (Powell, 1951)
- Trophonella enderbyensis (Powell, 1958) (taxon inquirendum)
- Trophonella eversoni (Houart, 1997)
- Trophonella longstaffi (E.A. Smith, 1907)
- Trophonella rugosolamellata Harasewych & Pastorino, 2010
- Trophonella scotiana (Powell, 1951)
- Trophonella shackletoni (Hedley, 1911)
