= Coronaster =

Scientific classification
- Kingdom: Animalia
- Phylum: Echinodermata
- Class: Asteroidea
- Order: Forcipulatida
- Family: Asteriidae
- Genus: Coronaster; Perrier, 1885

Species
- See text

Genus of starfishes

Coronaster is a genus of starfish in the family Asteriidae.

== Species ==
The World Register of Marine Species lists the following species:

- Coronaster briareus (Verrill, 1882)
- Coronaster eclipes Fisher, 1925
- Coronaster halicepus Fisher, 1917
- Coronaster marchenus Ziesenhenne, 1942
- Coronaster pauciporis Jangoux, 1984
- Coronaster reticulatus (H.L. Clark, 1916)
- Coronaster sakuranus (Döderlein, 1902)
- Coronaster volsellatus (Sladen, 1889)
