= Calasterias =

Scientific classification
- Kingdom: Animalia
- Phylum: Echinodermata
- Class: Asteroidea
- Order: Forcipulatida
- Family: Asteriidae
- Genus: Calasterias; R. Hayashi, 1975

Type species
- Calasterias toyamensis R. Hayashi, 1975

Diversity
- 1 species, see text

Genus of starfish

Calasterias is a genus of starfish in the family Asteriidae, first described by R. Hayashi in 1975.

== Species ==
The only species assigned to the genus is Calasterias toyamensis, also first described by R. Hayashi in 1975, which is named for its find location, Toyama Bay.
