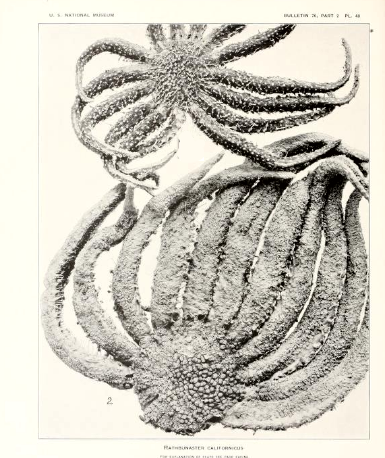
- Original image of Rathbunaster californicus

Scientific classification
- Kingdom: Animalia
- Phylum: Echinodermata
- Class: Asteroidea
- Order: Forcipulatida
- Family: Asteriidae
- Genus: Rathbunaster; Fisher, 1906
- Species: R. californicus

Binomial name
- Rathbunaster californicus Fisher, 1906

= Rathbunaster =

Genus of starfishes

Rathbunaster is a monospecific genus of sea stars in the family Asteriidae. The genus name was given by Walter Kenrick Fisher to honor the American biologist and administrator Richard Rathbun of the Smithsonian Institution. Rathbunaster had previously been classified in the Labidiasteridae, a family now found to be artificial. Molecular data has placed it soundly in the Asteriidae.

The only species in the genus, Rathbunaster californicus, common name California sun star, has a maximum size of about 45 centimeters in diameter and an average weight of 35 g. It lives on muddy benthic substrates between 60 and 1,000 m below the surface. it is covered in spikes with pincers that are used to capture prey for consumption.

== Description ==
Original description:

It resembles closely Pycnopodia Stimpson, but differing in having a smaller disk, with the rays constricted at the base and easily detachable. In the entire absence of rudimentary annular or calcareous ridges at the base of the ray, in the abortion of alternate supermarginal plates beyond the base of the ray, and in the small widely spaced inferomarginals each bearing a slender spine; in the greater prominence of the adambulacral plates which are placed on the same level with the inferomarginals (and each with a single spine as in Pycnopodia); in the less crowded condition of the ambulacral ossicles.

The circular isolated plates on abactinal surface of rays are more numerous than in Pycnopodia and each bears a wreathed spine, whereas in Pycnopodia spines are rare on abactinal plates of arm. There are no large bivalved pedicellariae as in Pycnopodia. Tube-feet quadriserial except at extremity and base of ray where they are biserial. Ambulacral plates being less crowded, the tube feet are really intermediate in arrangement between the biserial and quadriserial type. Mouth plates are more prominent than in Pycnopodia and approach in form the type common to Brisingidae. The actinostome is wide, like the Brisingidae.

== Distribution ==
Rathbunaster californicus lives along the west coast of North America from southern California to southern Alaska. It is found in muddy substrates in deep ocean/benthic environments and has been found at depths of 60 and 1,000 m below the surface off of California and depths from 99 to 768 m off the coast from the Puget Sound to Alaska.

== Anatomy and body plan ==
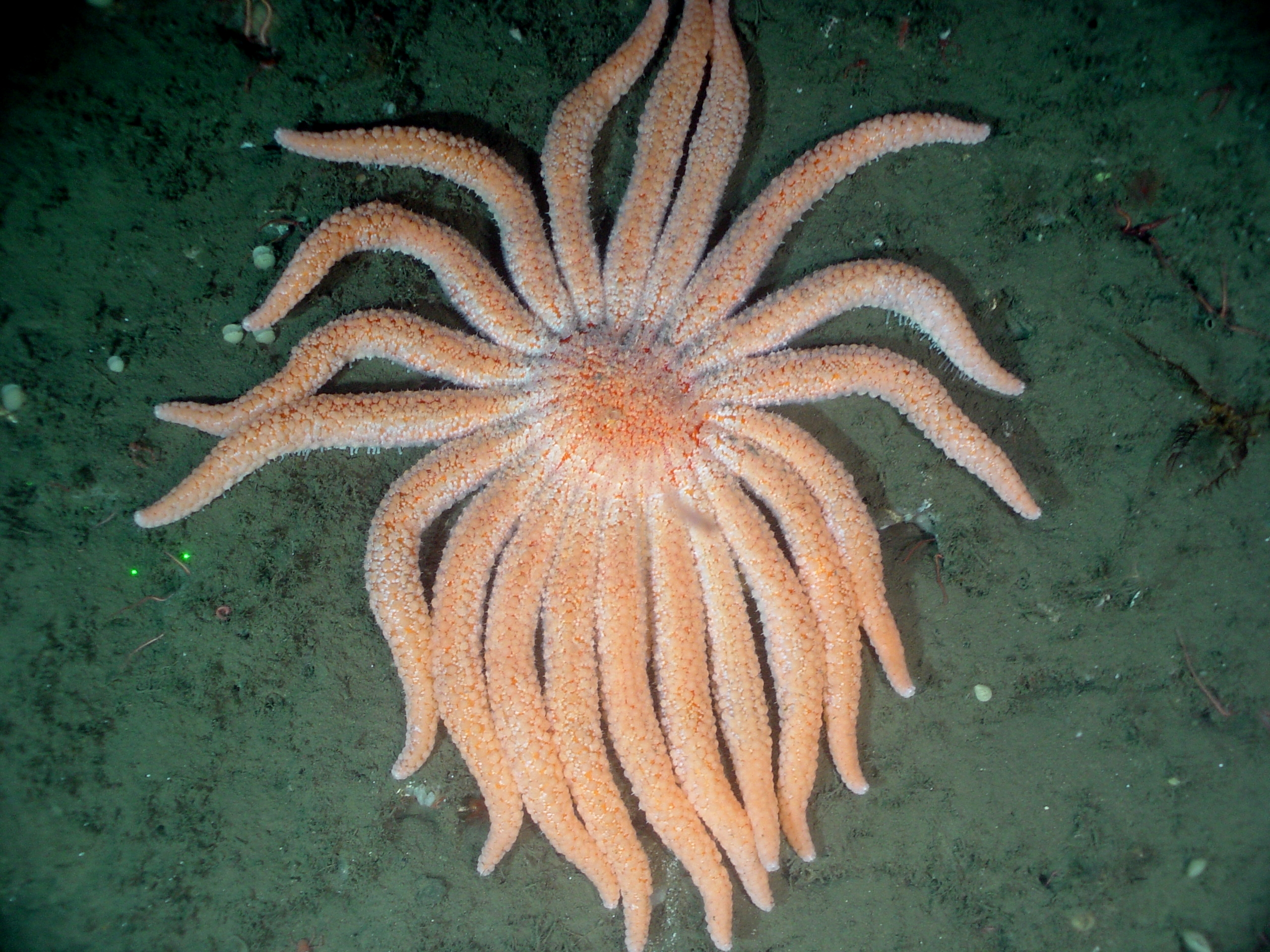
Rathbunaster californicus with arms extended

Rathbunaster californicus has pentaradial symmetry. It has 8–20 arms, all centered around a central disk. In its larval stage, it exhibits bilateral symmetry. Instead, one surface is considered the oral surface and the other the aboral surface. The oral surface consists of the mouth and tubular feet, while the aboral surface consists of the anus.

The endoskeleton of R. californicus is made up of calcareous ossicles, which are covered in a thin layer of the ciliated tissue. Inside there is a water vascular system, a complex system of fluid-filled canals.

Rathbunaster californicus, like other members of Echinodermata, has tubular feet. These feet are filled by the water vascular system. They are used for locomotion and help in feeding, gas exchange, and attachment to the surface. They are also part of the nervous system, which is decentralized and has no cerebral ganglion. The nervous system can respond to touch, light, and water currents and shows the potential of having complex behavior.

== Diet and digestion ==
Rathbunaster californicus is a carnivore and detritivore, feeding on crustaceans, worms, detritus, and fish using pincers on its aboral side. Because the majority of its prey is benthic, sediment is found in the stomach. One of the main decomposers in the deep ocean, it has been observed assisting in the decomposition of whale carcasses in the Monterey Canyon. The stomach has strong digestive enzymes, and R. californicus can start digesting food before it even enters its digestive system. The short digestive glands extend into the arms.

== Reproduction ==
The reproductive biology of Rathbunaster californicus is poorly understood.

== Ecological impact ==
Rathbunaster californicus is a very important species in its ecosystems. It is one of the most abundant sea stars along the west coast of the United States, and the most abundant star in the Monterey Canyon. It plays multiple important ecological roles, eating a variety of organisms and controlling populations of those species. It is also a deep water decomposer and helps recycle nutrients and sequester carbon into sediments.

== Parasite ==
In Monterey Canyon, R. californicus has been found infected with an endoparasitic gastropod called Asterophila rathbunasteriWaren & Lewis, 1994. These parasites are observed externally as distinctly round swellings on the arm.
