= Aphanasterias =

Scientific classification
- Kingdom: Animalia
- Phylum: Echinodermata
- Class: Asteroidea
- Order: Forcipulatida
- Family: Asteriidae
- Genus: Aphanasterias; Fisher, 1923
- Species: A. pycnopodia

Binomial name
- Aphanasterias pycnopodia Fisher, 1923

Genus of starfishes

Aphanasterias is a genus of starfish in the family Asteriidae. It has one species, Aphanasterias pycnopodia. The genus and species were first described by Walter Kenrick Fisher in 1923.

== Distribution ==
It is found in oceans all over the world.
