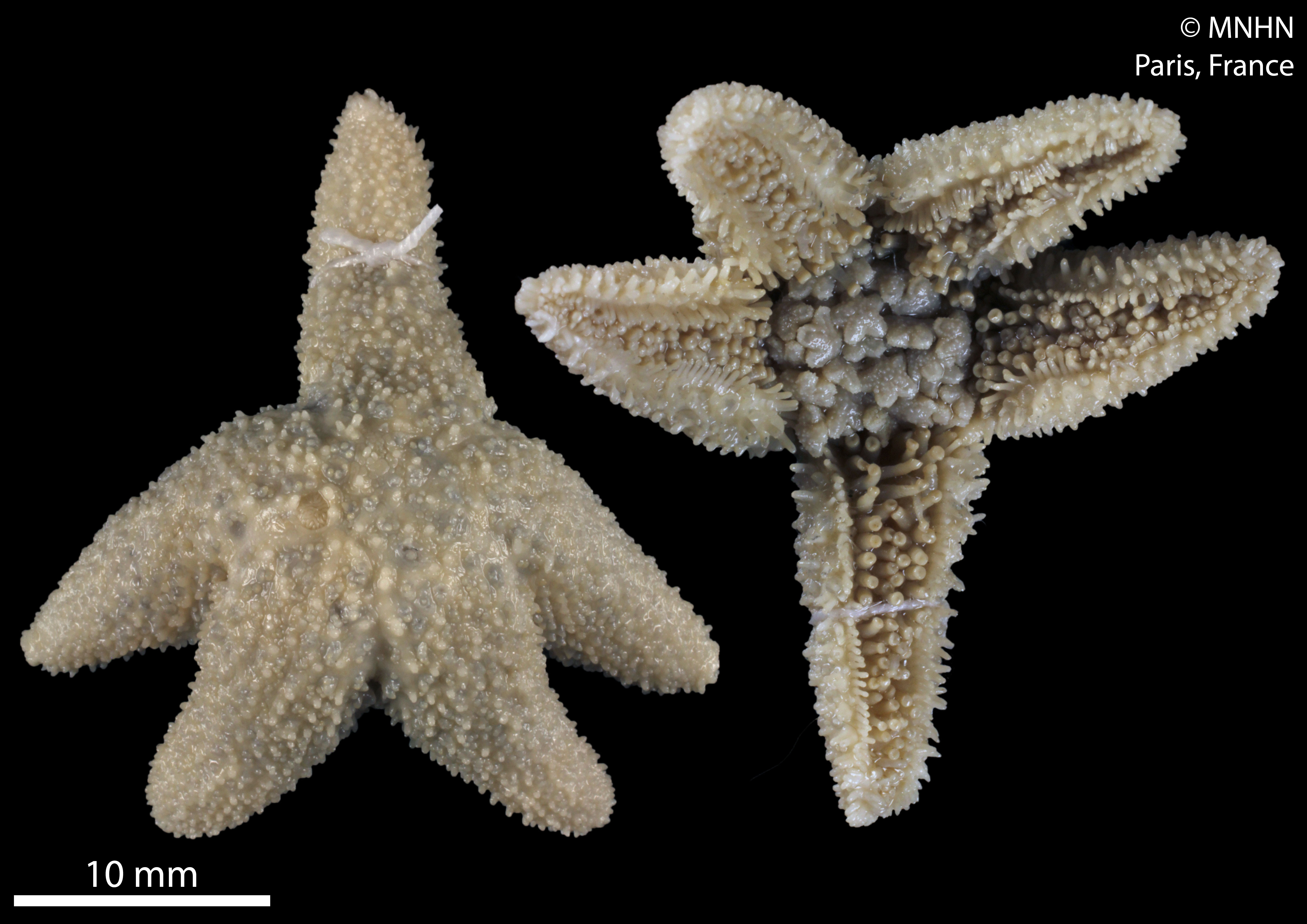
- Anasterias antarctica

Scientific classification
- Kingdom: Animalia
- Phylum: Echinodermata
- Class: Asteroidea
- Order: Forcipulatida
- Family: Asteriidae
- Genus: Anasterias; Perrier, 1875

Species
- See text

= Anasterias =

Genus of starfishes

Anasterias is a genus of starfish in the family Asteriidae.

== Species ==
The World Register of Marine Species lists the following species:

- Anasterias antarctica (Lütken, 1857)
- Anasterias antipodium (Bell, 1882)
- Anasterias asterinoides Perrier, 1875
- Anasterias directa (Koehler, 1920)
- Anasterias laevigata (Hutton, 1879)
- Anasterias mawsoni (Koehler, 1920)
- Anasterias pedicellaris Koehler, 1923
- Anasterias perrieri (E. A. Smith, 1876)
- Anasterias rupicola (Verrill, 1876)
- Anasterias sphaerulata (Koehler, 1920)
- Anasterias spirabilis (Bell, 1881)
- Anasterias studeri Perrier, 1891
- Anasterias suteri (deLoriol, 1894)
- Anasterias varia (Philippi, 1870)
