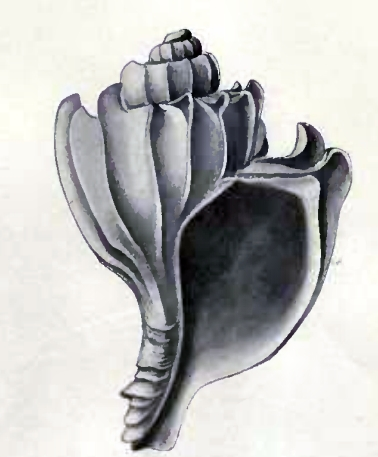
- Original image of a shell of Trophonella shackletoni

Scientific classification
- Kingdom: Animalia
- Phylum: Mollusca
- Class: Gastropoda
- Subclass: Caenogastropoda
- Order: Neogastropoda
- Family: Muricidae
- Genus: Trophonella
- Species: T. shackletoni

Binomial name
- Trophonella shackletoni (Hedley, 1911)

Synonyms
- Trophon shackletoni Hedley, 1911 (basionym); Trophon shackletoni shackletoni Hedley, 1911

= Trophonella shackletoni =

Species of gastropod

Trophonella shackletoni is a species of sea snail, a marine gastropod mollusk in the family Muricidae, the murex snails or rock snails.
