= Trophonella eversoni =

Scientific classification
- Kingdom: Animalia
- Phylum: Mollusca
- Class: Gastropoda
- Subclass: Caenogastropoda
- Order: Neogastropoda
- Family: Muricidae
- Genus: Trophonella
- Species: T. eversoni

Binomial name
- Trophonella eversoni (Houart, 1997)

Synonyms
- Trophon eversoni Houart, 1997

Species of gastropod

Trophonella eversoni is a species of sea snail, a marine gastropod mollusk in the family Muricidae, the murex snails or rock snails.
