= Urticinopsis antarctica =

Scientific classification
- Kingdom: Animalia
- Phylum: Cnidaria
- Subphylum: Anthozoa
- Class: Hexacorallia
- Order: Actiniaria
- Family: Actiniidae
- Genus: Urticinopsis
- Species: U. antarctica

Binomial name
- Urticinopsis antarctica (Verrill, 1922)

Synonyms
- Rhodactinia clubbi Pax; Urticina antarctica Verrill, 1922

Species of sea anemone

Urticinopsis antarctica is a species of sea anemone in the family Actiniidae. It is found in the Southern Ocean around Antarctica.

== Description ==
Urticinopsis antarctica is a large species of sea anemone, with a column height of up to 120 mm (5 in), and numerous long slender tentacles.

== Distribution ==
Urticinopsis antarctica is a common species in Antarctic and Subantarctic waters. It has been recorded at McMurdo Sound, the South Shetland Islands, Prydz Bay, the Cosmonauts Sea, the Haswell Islands in the Davis Sea, and the Weddell Sea.

== Ecology ==
The waters under the ice packs around Antarctica show a marked zonation. U antarctica is found in Zone II, between 15 and 33 m (50 and 110 ft) deep, where it is one of the dominant sessile organisms, alongside various other sea anemones, the soft coral Alcyonium antarcticum, the stoloniferan Clavularia frankliniana and the hydroids Tubularia hodgsoni and Lampra parvula. Here U antarctica mostly feeds on sea urchins in the genus Sterechinus.

It is also present in Zone III, deeper than 33 m (110 ft) and below the depth at which anchor ice forms. Here the seabed is characterised by a layer of sponge spicules and dead mollusc shells a metre or more thick, with living sponges growing on the surface. In this zone it preys on the various species of starfish found here, grazing on and feeding among the sponges, such as Diplasterias brucei. Examination of the contents of the gastrovascular cavities of these sea anemones show that the diet can include sea urchins, starfish, sea cucumbers, brittle stars, crinoids, gastropod and bivalve molluscs, and small fish; also found in the stomach cavities, but completely undigested, were several amphipod crustaceans, and these are hypothesised to have been living there as commensals.
