= Trophonella enderbyensis =

Scientific classification
- Kingdom: Animalia
- Phylum: Mollusca
- Class: Gastropoda
- Subclass: Caenogastropoda
- Order: Neogastropoda
- Family: Muricidae
- Genus: Trophonella
- Species: T. enderbyensis

Binomial name
- Trophonella enderbyensis (Powell, 1958)

Synonyms
- Trophon enderbyensis Powell, 1958

Species of gastropod

Trophonella enderbyensis is a species of sea snail, a marine gastropod mollusk in the family Muricidae, the murex snails or rock snails.

== Distribution ==
This species occurs in Antarctic waters.
