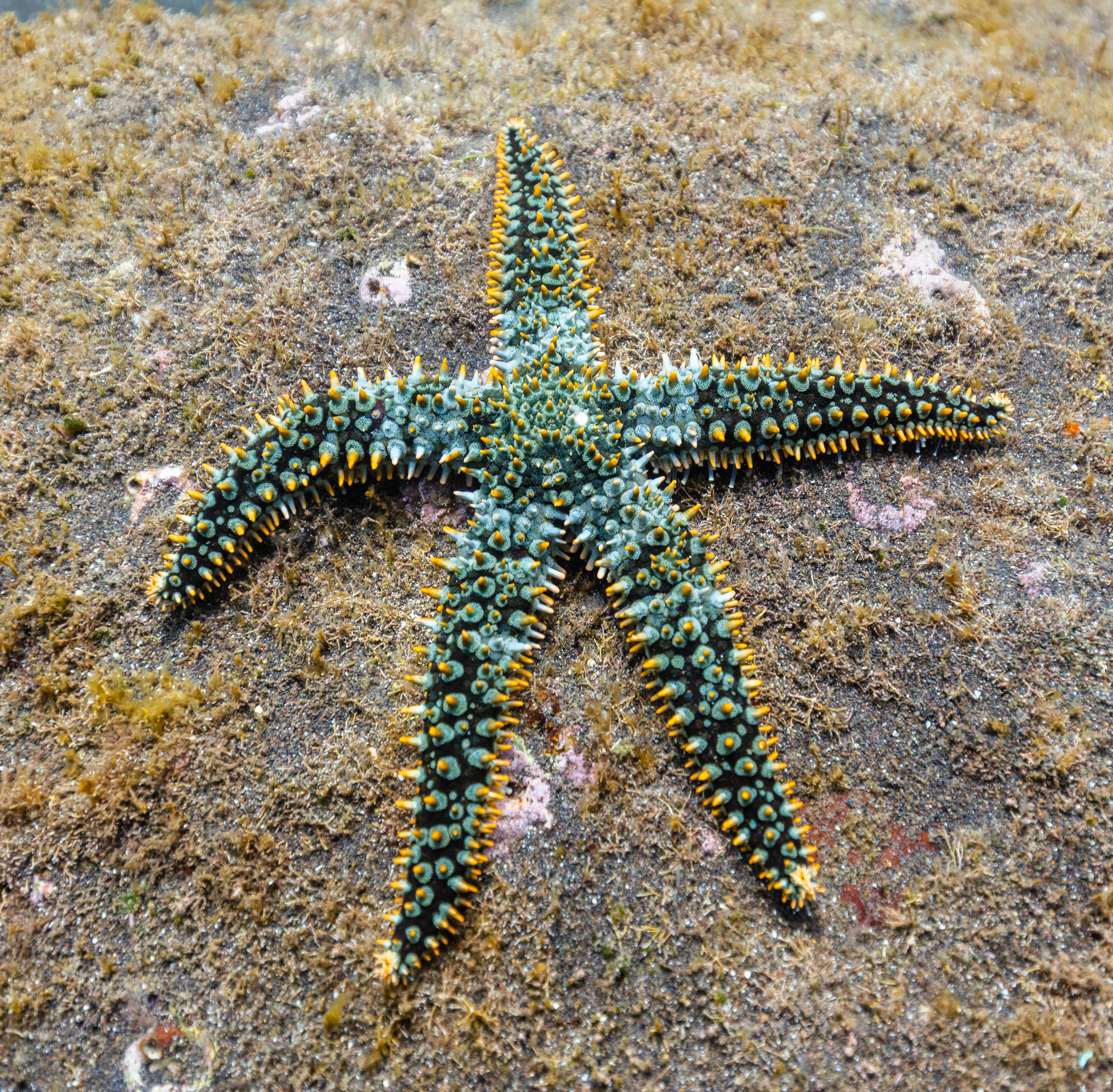
- Marthasterias glacialis

Scientific classification
- Kingdom: Animalia
- Phylum: Echinodermata
- Class: Asteroidea
- Order: Forcipulatida
- Family: Asteriidae
- Genus: Marthasterias; Jullien, 1878

= Marthasterias =

Genus of starfishes

Marthasterias is a genus of starfish in the family Asteriidae. Both species in the genus are commonly known as the spiny starfish.

== Species ==
As of October 2023 the accepted species are:

Image	Scientific name	Distribution
	Marthasterias africana (Müller & Troschel, 1842)	South Africa.
	Marthasterias glacialis (Linnaeus, 1758)	eastern Atlantic Ocean.

== Description ==
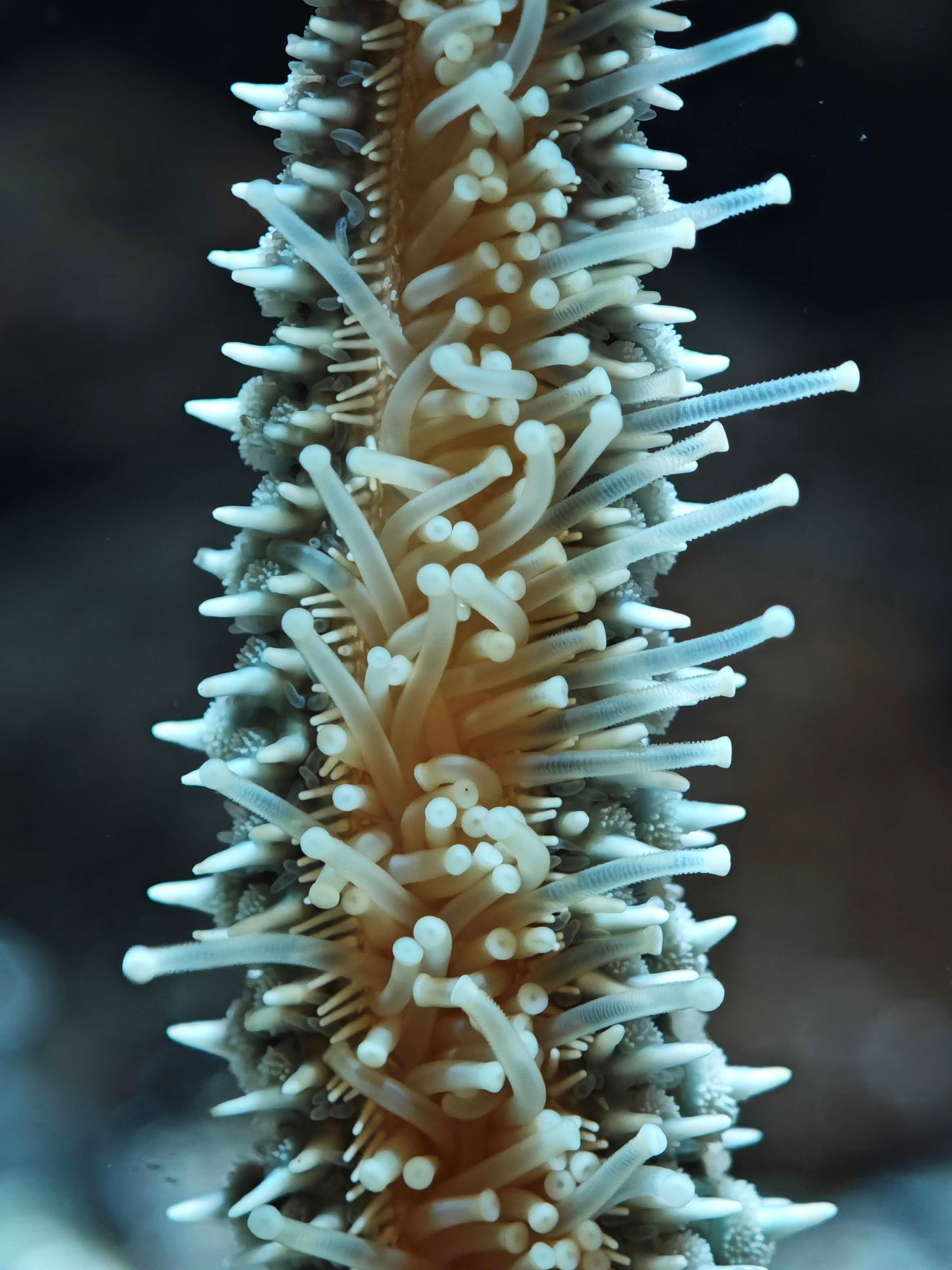
The underside of the arm of the starfish Marthasterias glacialis

Marthasterias glacialis is a fairly large starfish with a small central disc and five slender, tapering arms. Each arm has three longitudinal rows of conical, whitish spines, usually with purple tips, each surrounded by a wreath of pedicellariae. The background colour is variable and may be brownish or greenish-grey, tinged with yellow or red and sometimes with purple at the tips of the arms. This species can grow to 70 cm (28 in) but a more usual size is 25 to 30 cm (10 to 12 in). It is sometimes confused with the northern starfish Leptasterias muelleri.

== Distribution and habitat ==
Marthasterias glacialis is native to the Eastern Atlantic Ocean (from Iceland and Macaronesia in the North Atlantic, while M. capensis is known from Angola and South Africa in the South Atlantic), and the Baltic and Mediterranean seas. Around the British Isles it is limited to the western side of Scotland, Wales, the western part of southern England and most of Ireland. Its depth range is subtidal down to about 200 m (656 ft) and it is found on both sheltered muddy substrates and on rocks.

== Ecology ==
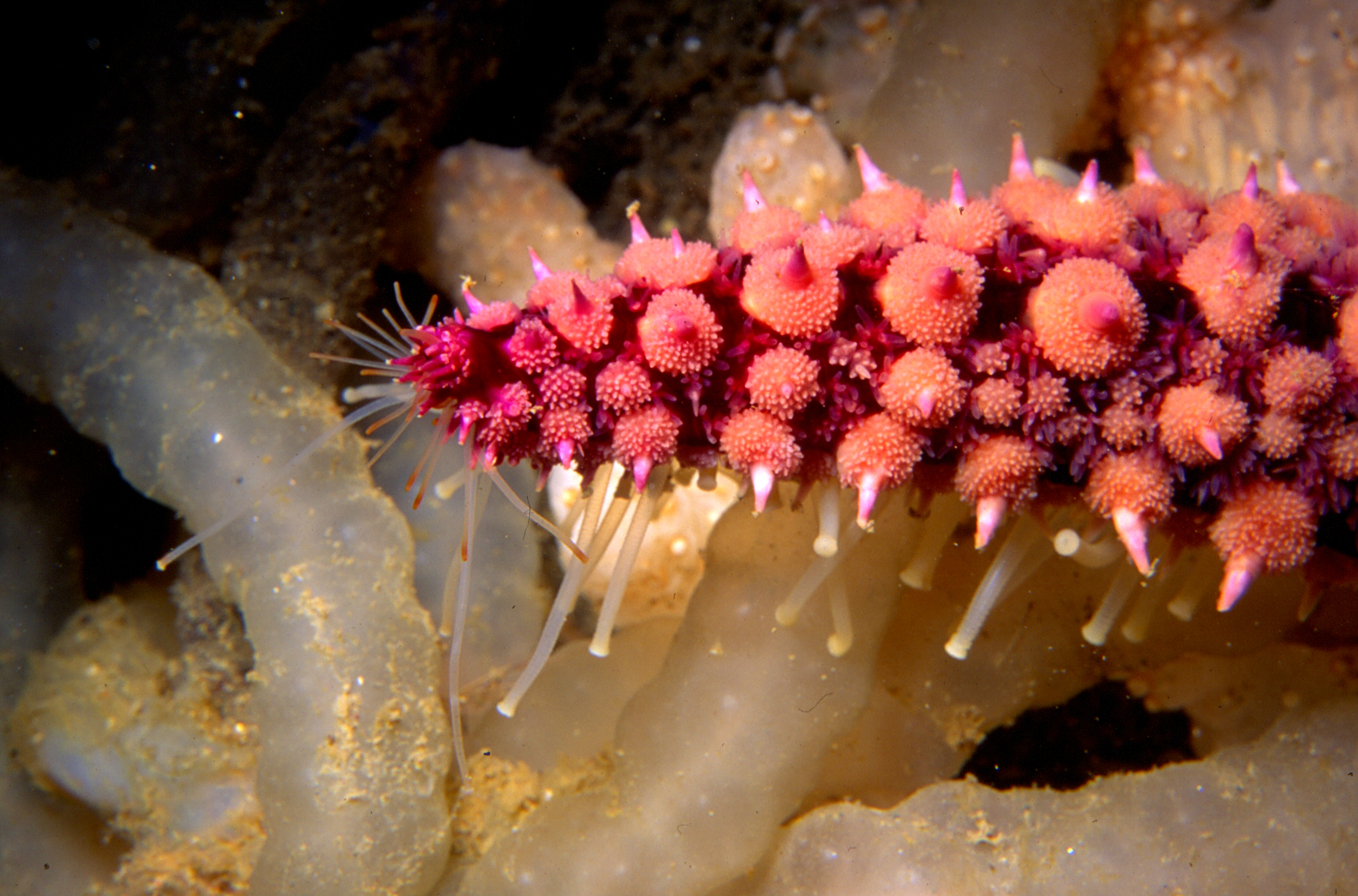
Detail of tip of arm showing tube feet extended

Like other starfish in the family Asteriidae, Marthasterias glacialis is a predator and feeds mostly on bivalve molluscs and other invertebrates. It has been found that secondary metabolites known as saponins, found within the starfish's tissues, have a dramatic effect on the whelk Buccinum undatum. At low concentrations they cause the mollusc to withdraw from the vicinity of the starfish and at higher concentrations they cause convulsions in the mollusc's musculature. The sea urchins Strongylocentrotus droebachiensis and Psammechinus miliaris are also affected by the chemicals. S. droebachiensis flees but P. miliaris has toxic pedicellariae and is able to defend itself.

The reproductive biology of this starfish has been little studied but off the coast of Ireland, individuals gather together in very shallow water in July and August. A few days later, on a warm afternoon, they have been observed to arch their bodies and release spawn into the sea. A rise in the water temperature seems to have triggered the spawning. Male starfish as small as 2.5 cm (1 in) were observed to spawn, and females of at least 9 cm (3.5 in) diameter.
