= Urticinopsis =

Scientific classification
- Kingdom: Animalia
- Phylum: Cnidaria
- Subphylum: Anthozoa
- Class: Hexacorallia
- Order: Actiniaria
- Family: Actiniidae
- Genus: Urticinopsis; Carlgren, 1927

Species
- See text

Genus of sea anemones

Urticina is a genus of sea anemones in the family Actiniidae.

== Species ==
The following species are listed in the World Register of Marine Species (WoRMS):

- Urticinopsis antarctica (Verrill, 1922)
- Urticina crassa Carlgren, 1938
