= Caimanaster =

Scientific classification
- Kingdom: Animalia
- Phylum: Echinodermata
- Class: Asteroidea
- Order: Forcipulatida
- Family: Asteriidae
- Genus: Caimanaster; A.M. Clark, 1962
- Species: C. acutus

Binomial name
- Caimanaster acutus A.M. Clark, 1962

Genus of starfishes

Caimanaster is a monotypic genus of starfish in the family Asteriidae. The only species is Caimanaster acutus.

== Distributions ==
It is found in the Antarctic.
