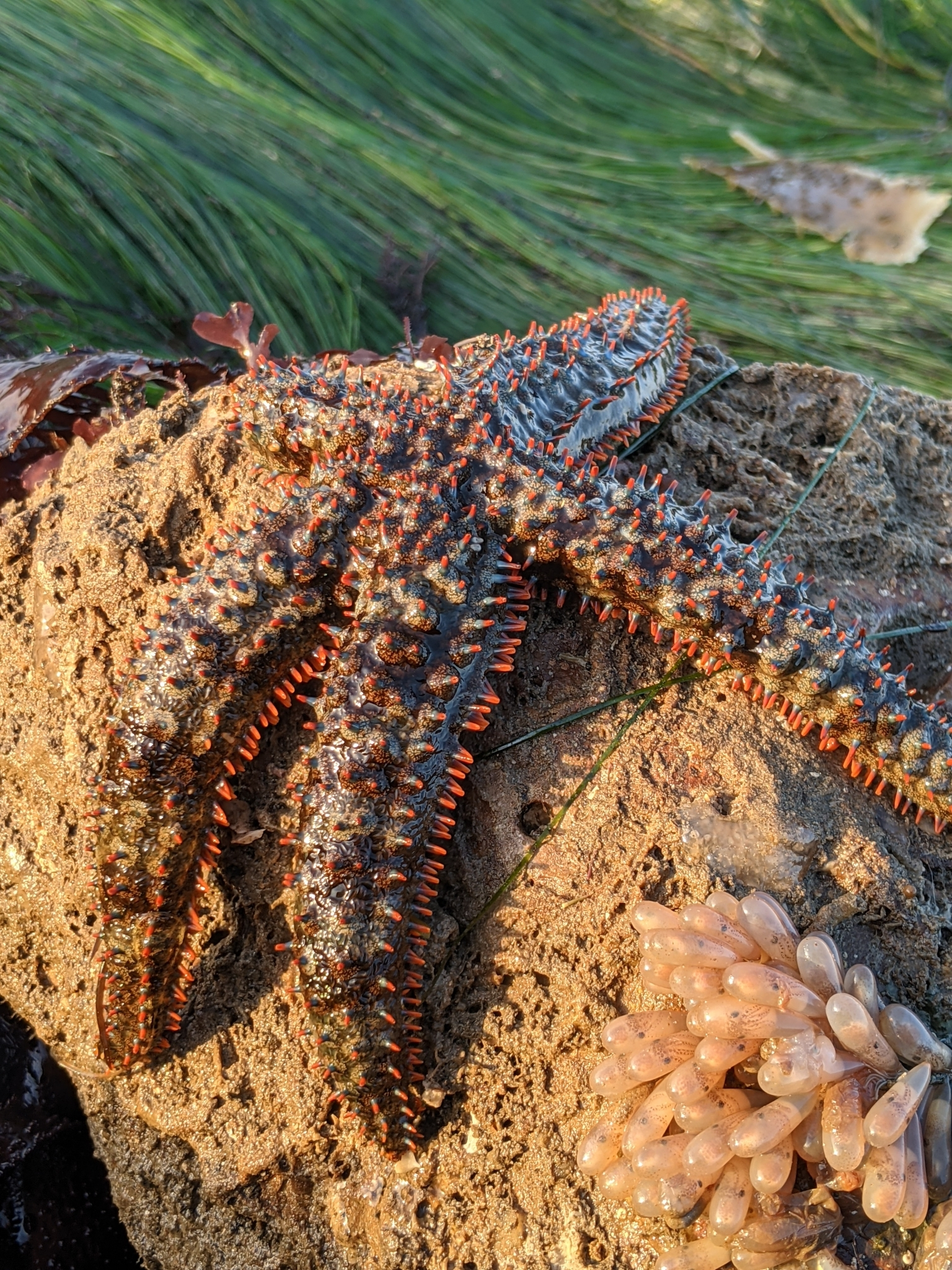

Scientific classification
- Kingdom: Animalia
- Phylum: Echinodermata
- Class: Asteroidea
- Order: Forcipulatida
- Family: Asteriidae
- Genus: Astrometis; Fisher, 1923
- Species: A. sertulifera

Binomial name
- Astrometis sertulifera (Xantus, 1860)

Synonyms
- Astrometis californica (Verrill, 1914)

= Astrometis =

Species of sea star

Astrometis sertulifera, the fragile rainbow star, is the only species of sea star in the monotypic genus Astrometis. It is found from Santa Barbara to the Gulf of California.

== Appearance ==
The common name comes from the often brilliant coloration of the species. The spines on the top side can be purple, orange, or blue with red tips, and the tube feet often have several colors as well. The species grows to 8.1 cm, and almost always is found with 5 symmetric arms.

== Behavior ==
Like all species of sea star, this species can occasionally break off (and later regrow) one of its arms, but has less tendency to discard its limbs than most sea stars in California.

=== Eating habits ===
They feed primarily on small crabs, though chitons, snails, clams, barnacles, brittle stars, and urchins have also been found in the diet. Their method of feeding is unique among sea stars. Rather than grasp their prey from below with their tube feet, they capture prey on their top surface using pedicellariae. These parrot-beak-like appendages are set into cushions surrounded the larger multi-colored spines on the animals' top. When prey is sensed, the cushion is raised above the level of the spines, and the "jaws" clamp shut. Prey can be held immobile for some time before being transferred under the animal and eaten. Fragile rainbow stars are eaten by sunstars in the genus Heliaster.
