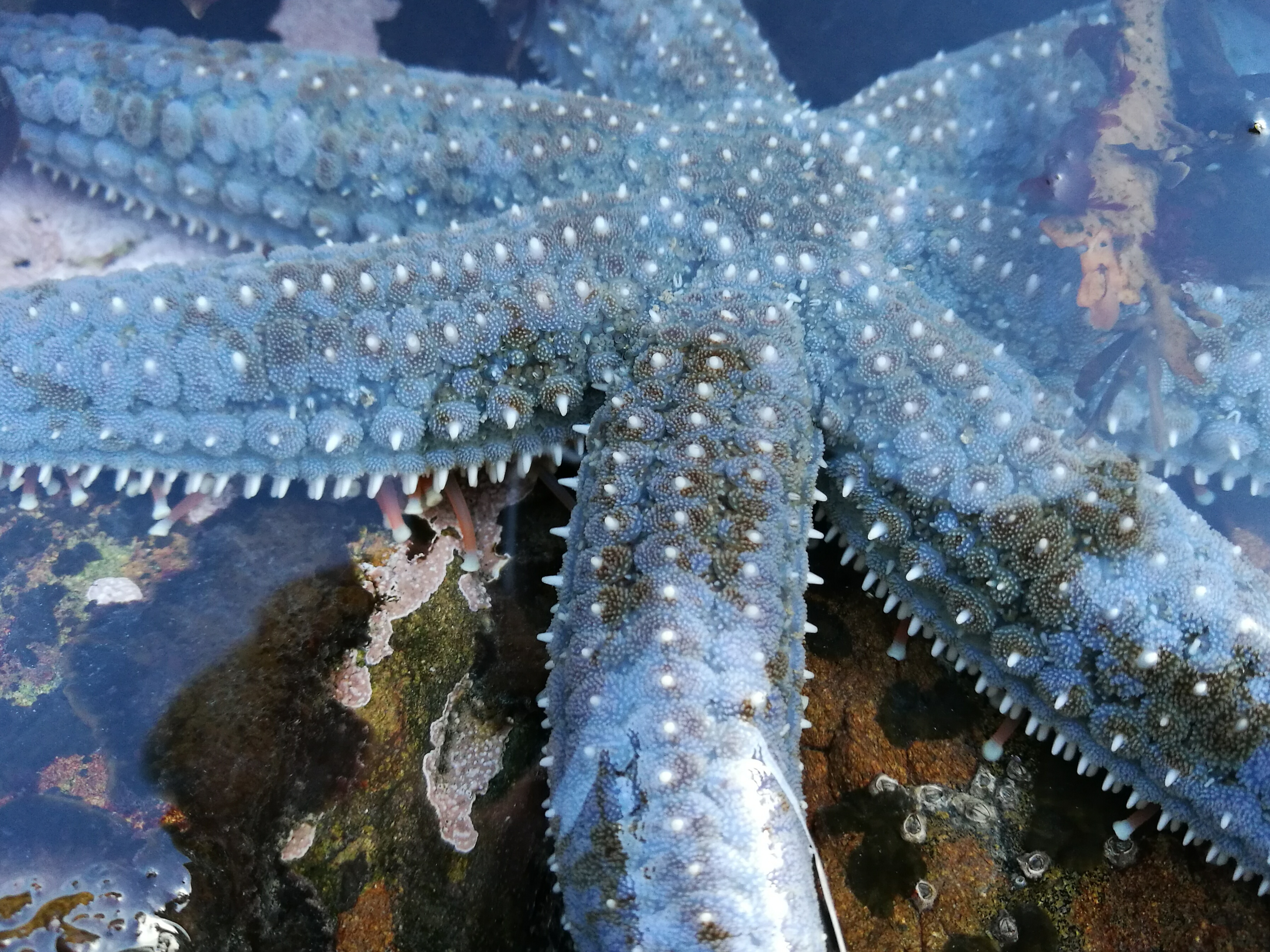
- Astrostole scabra

Scientific classification
- Kingdom: Animalia
- Phylum: Echinodermata
- Class: Asteroidea
- Order: Forcipulatida
- Family: Asteriidae
- Genus: Astrostole; Fisher, 1923

Species
- See text

= Astrostole =

Genus of starfishes

Astrostole is a genus of sea stars in the family Asteriidae.

== Species ==
- Astrostole insularis Clark, 1938
- Astrostole multispina Clark, 1950
- Astrostole paschae Clark, 1920
- Astrostole platei Meissner 1896
- Astrostole rodolphi Perrier, 1875
- Astrostole scabra Hutton, 1872
