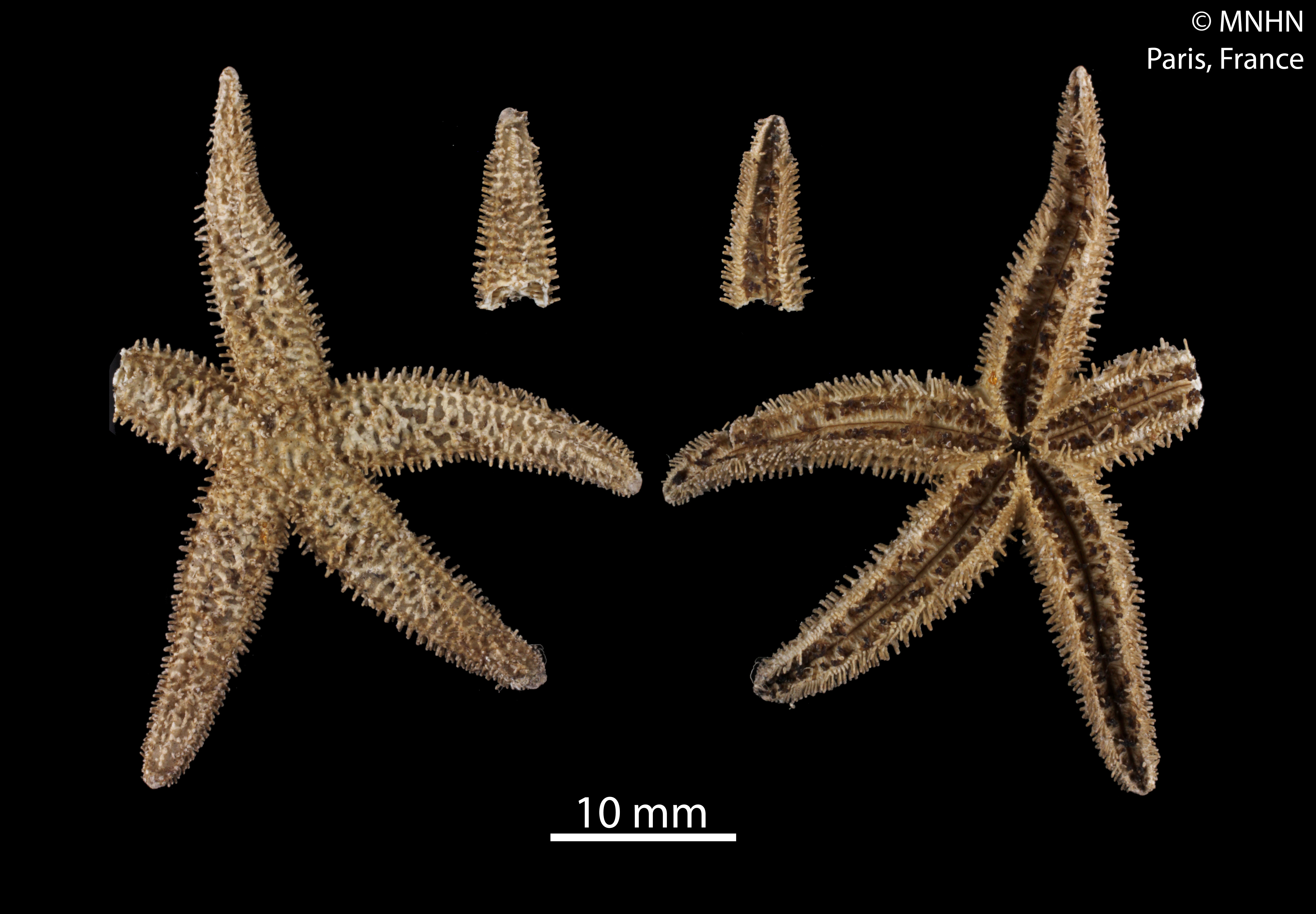

Scientific classification
- Kingdom: Animalia
- Phylum: Echinodermata
- Class: Asteroidea
- Order: Forcipulatida
- Family: Asteriidae
- Genus: Diplasterias; Perrier, 1891

Species
- See text

= Diplasterias =

Genus of starfishes

Diplasterias is a genus of starfish in the family Asteriidae.

== Species ==
The World Register of Marine Species lists the following species:

- Diplasterias brandti (Bell, 1881)
- Diplasterias brucei (Koehler, 1908)
- Diplasterias kerguelenensis (Koehler, 1917)
- Diplasterias meridionalis (Perrier, 1875)
- Diplasterias octoradiata (Studer, 1885)
- Diplasterias radiata (Koehler, 1923)
- Diplasterias spinosa Perrier, 1881
