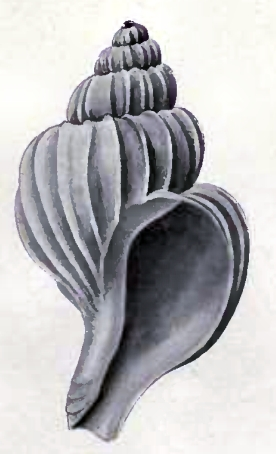
- Apertural view of a shell of Trophonella longstaffi

Scientific classification
- Kingdom: Animalia
- Phylum: Mollusca
- Class: Gastropoda
- Subclass: Caenogastropoda
- Order: Neogastropoda
- Family: Muricidae
- Genus: Trophonella
- Species: T. longstaffi

Binomial name
- Trophonella longstaffi (E.A. Smith, 1907)

Synonyms
- Trophon longstaffi E. A. Smith, 1907

= Trophonella longstaffi =

Species of gastropod

Trophonella longstaffi is a species of sea snail, a marine gastropod mollusk in the family Muricidae, the murex snails or rock snails.

== Distribution ==
Deep water in the Antarctic area.
