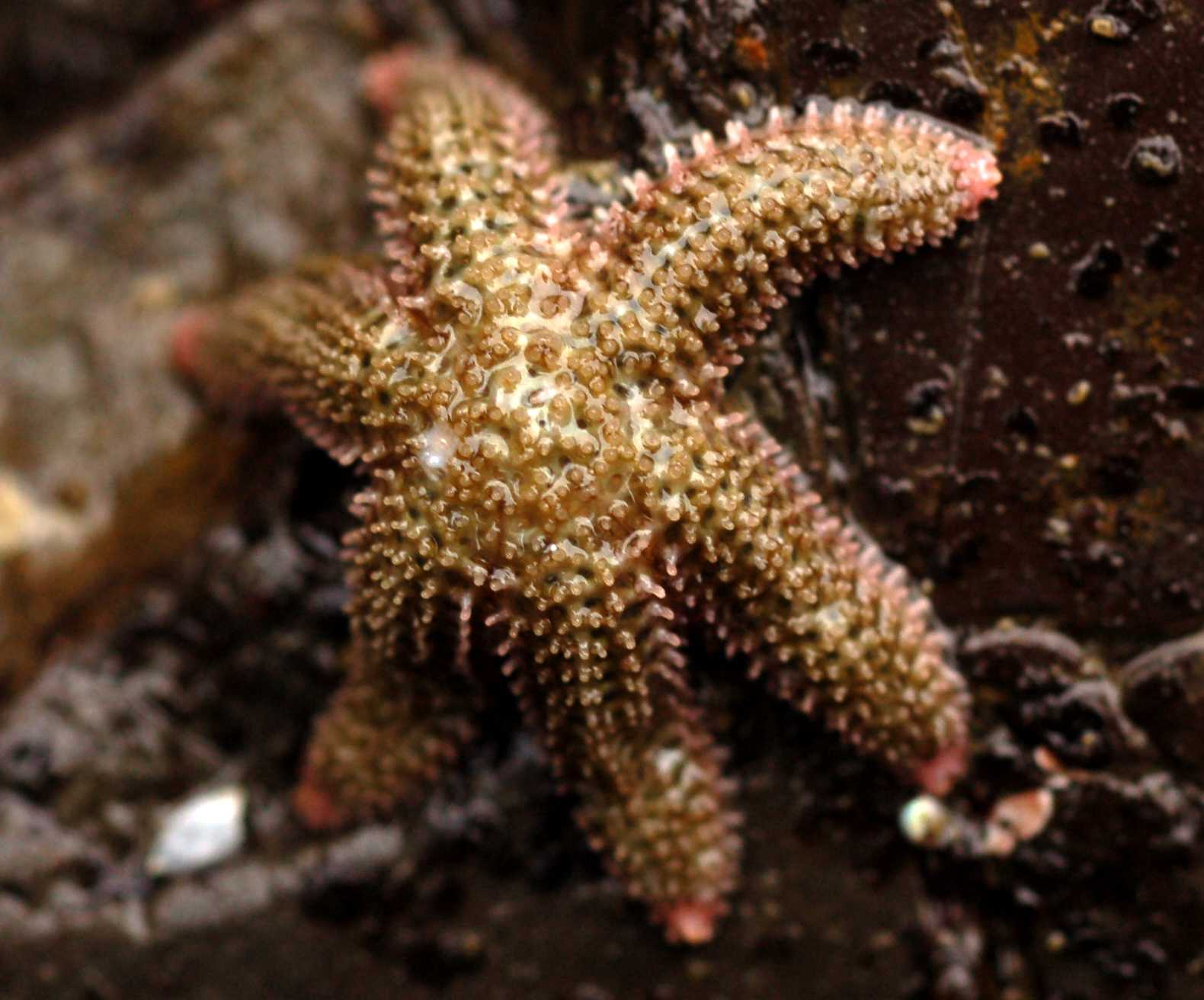
- Leptasterias hexactis

Scientific classification
- Kingdom: Animalia
- Phylum: Echinodermata
- Class: Asteroidea
- Order: Forcipulatida
- Family: Asteriidae; Gray, 1840

Type species
- Asterias rubens Linnaeus, 1758

Diversity
- 39 genera, see text

= Asteriidae =

Asteriidae Temporal range: Late Cretaceous–Recent

Family of starfishes

The Asteriidae are a diverse family of Asteroidea (sea stars) in the order Forcipulatida. It is one of three families in the order Forcipulatida.

The oldest unambiguous fossils of the family date to the Late Cretaceous.

== Genera ==
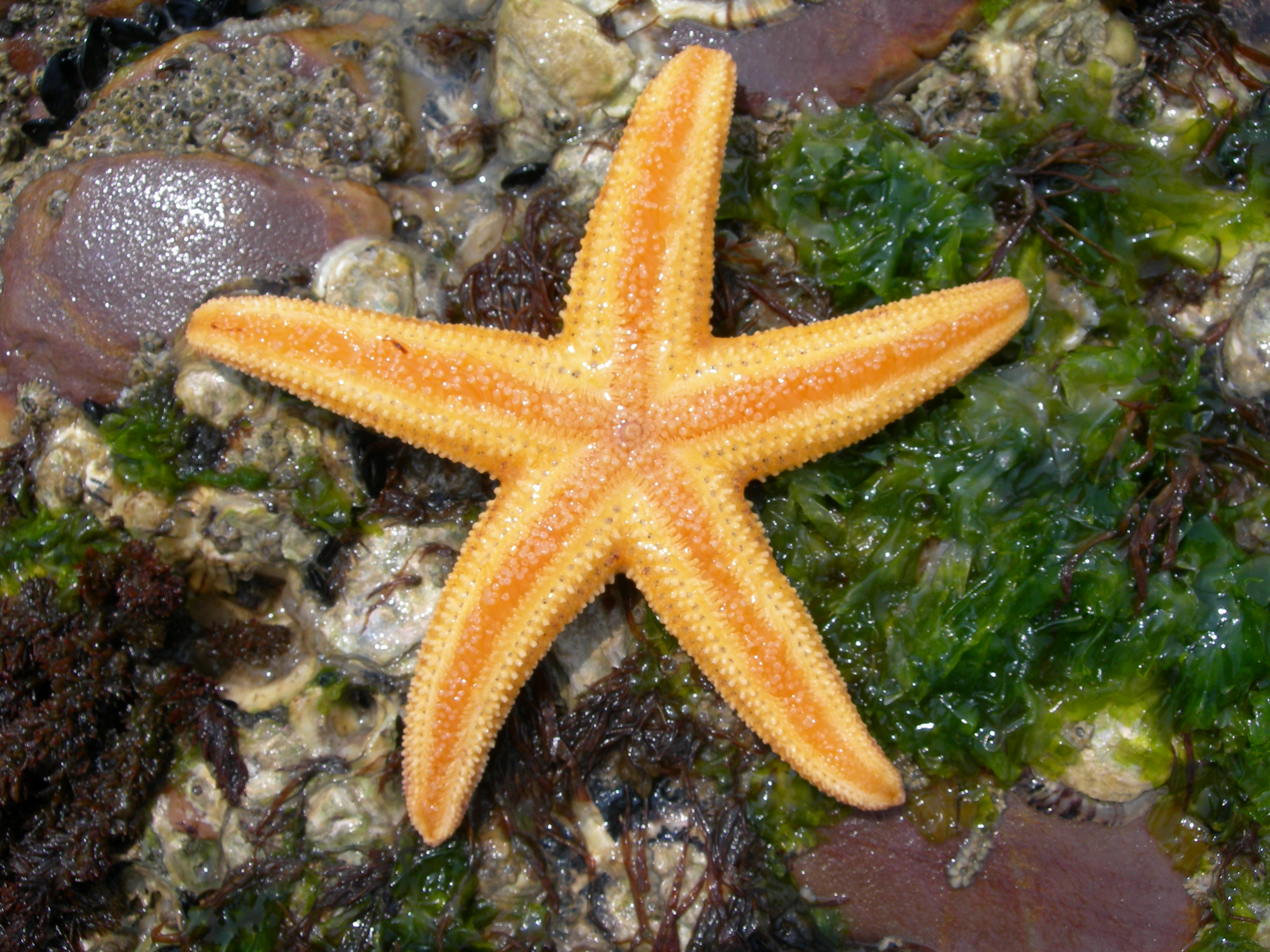
Pacific sea star, Asterias amurensis

The World Register of Marine Species lists these genera within the family Asteriidae (in a field of 6 families):

- Adelasterias Verrill, 1914
- Anasterias Perrier, 1875
- Aphanasterias Fisher, 1923
- Aphelasterias Fisher, 1923
- Asterias Linnaeus, 1758
- Astrometis Fisher, 1923
- Astrostole Fisher, 1923
- Caimanaster A.M. Clark, 1962
- Calasterias Hayashi, 1975
- Coronaster Perrier, 1885
- Coscinasterias Verrill, 1867
- Cryptasterias Verrill, 1914
- Diplasterias Perrier, 1891
- Distolasterias Perrier, 1896
- Evasterias Verrill, 1914
- Icasterias Fisher, 1923
- Kenrickaster A.M. Clark, 1962
- Leptasterias Verrill, 1866
- Lethasterias Fisher, 1923
- Lysasterias Fisher, 1908
- Lysastrosoma Fisher, 1922
- Marthasterias Jullien, 1878
- Meyenaster Verrill, 1913
- Notasterias Koehler, 1911
- Orthasterias Verrill, 1914
- Perissasterias H.L. Clark, 1923
- Pycnopodia Stimpson, 1862
- Pisaster Müller and Troschel, 1840
- Plazaster Fisher, 1941
- Psalidaster Fisher, 1940
- Rathbunaster Fisher, 1906
- Saliasterias Koehler, 1920
- Sclerasterias Perrier, 1891
- Stephanasterias Verrill, 1871
- Stylasterias Verrill, 1914
- Taranuiaster McKnight, 1973
- Tarsastrocles Fisher, 1923
- Urasterias Verrill, 1909
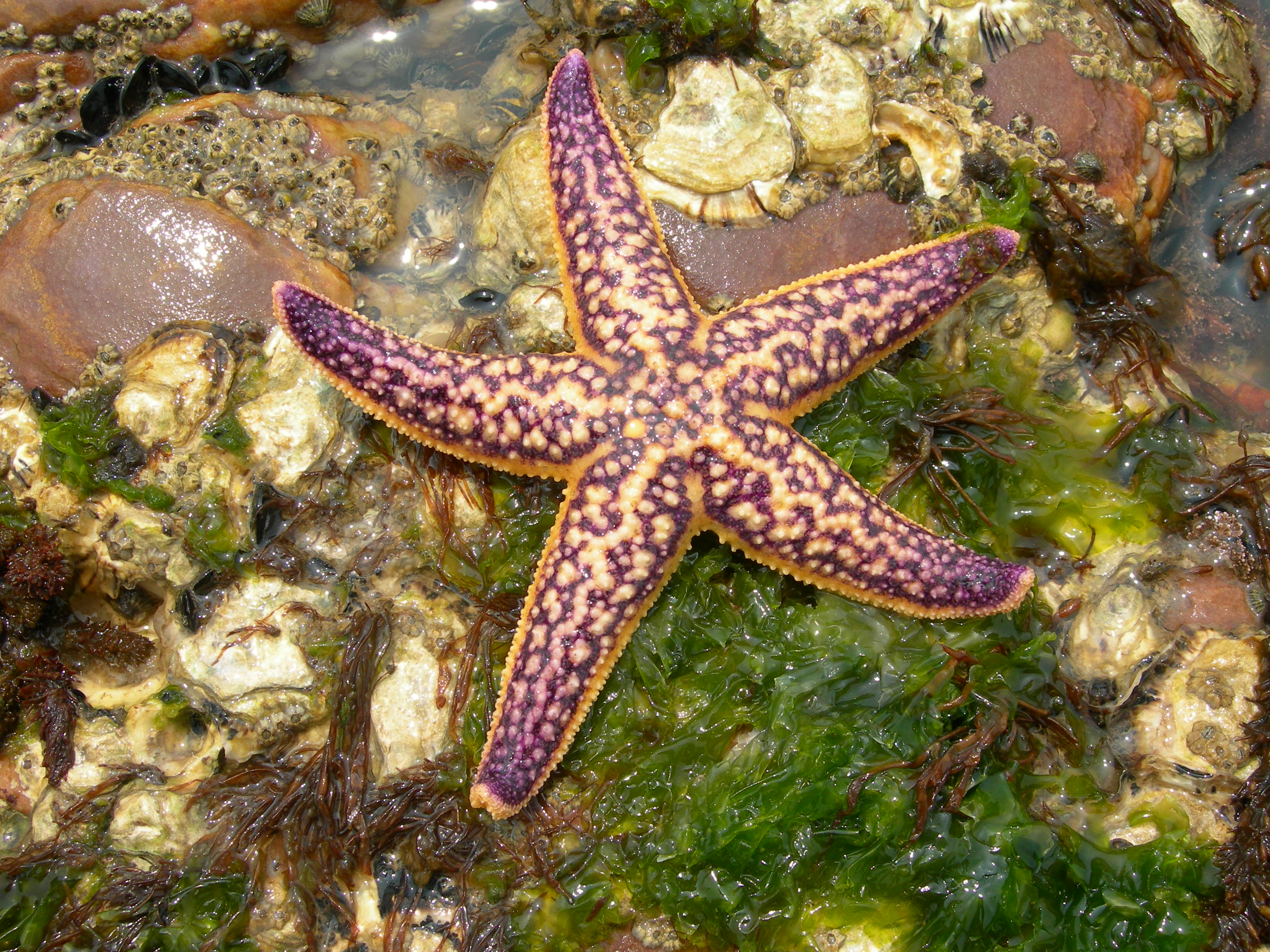
Asterias amurensis

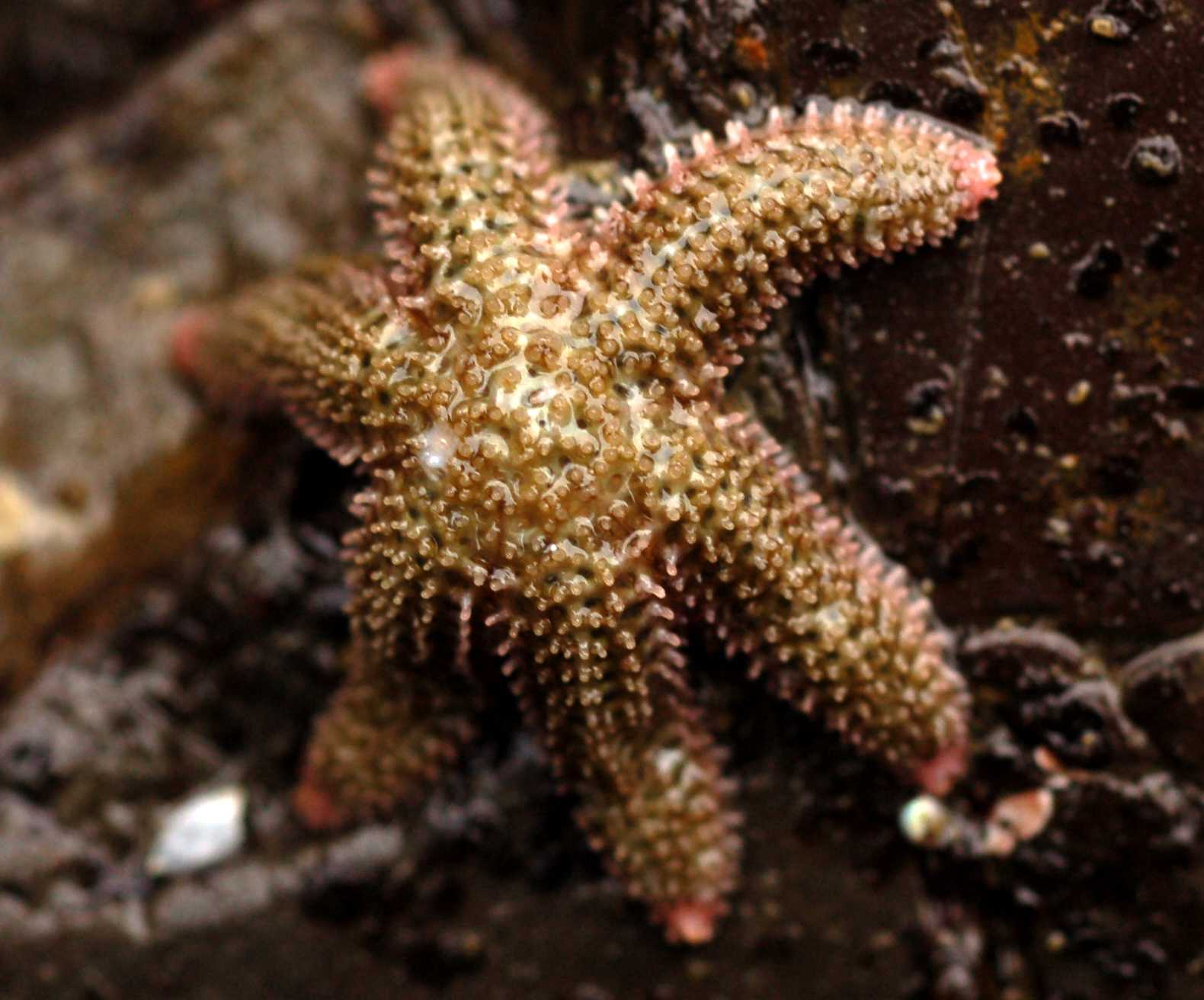
Leptasterias hexactis

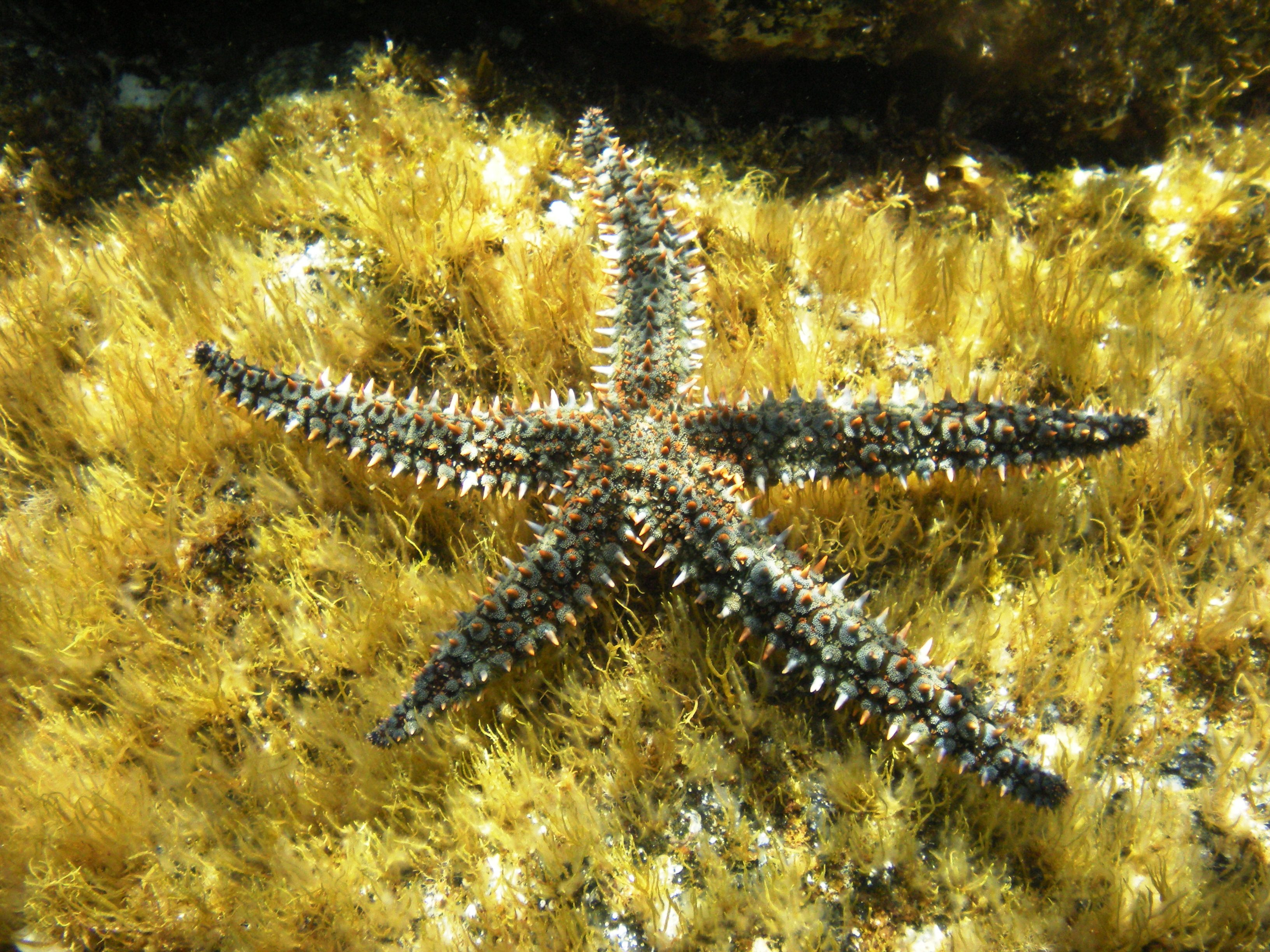
Marthasterias glacialis

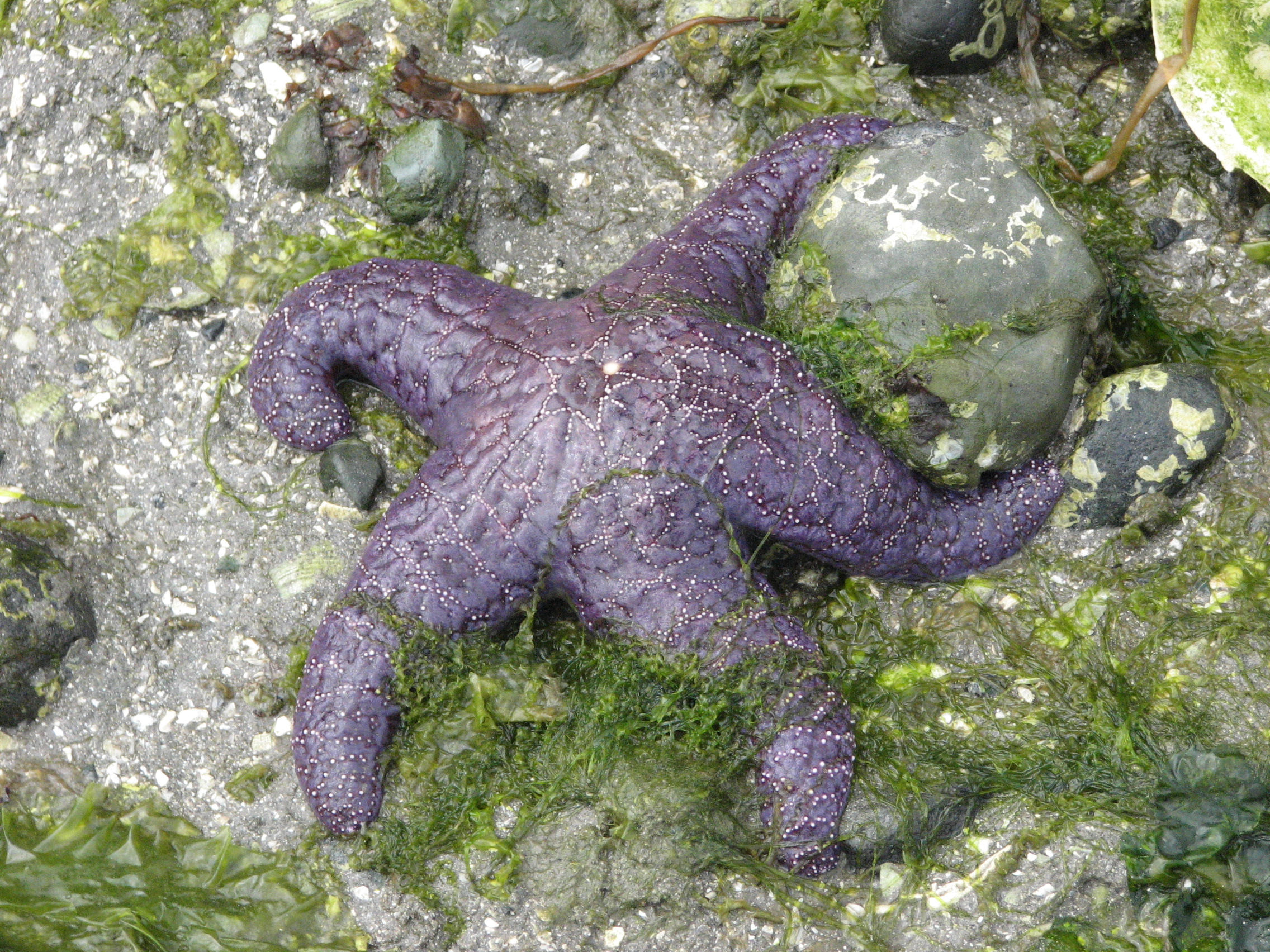
Pisaster ochraceus

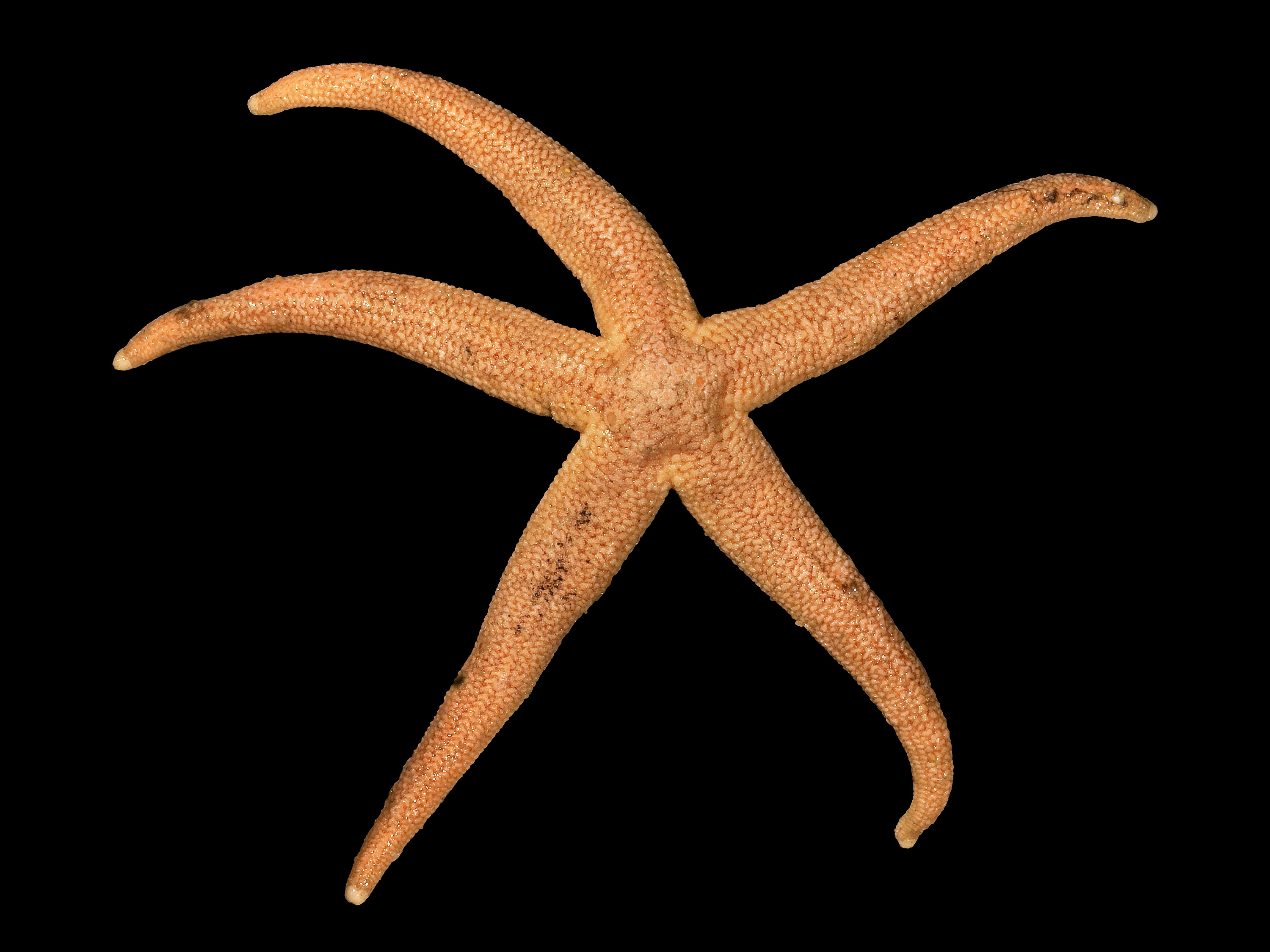
Stichastrella rosea

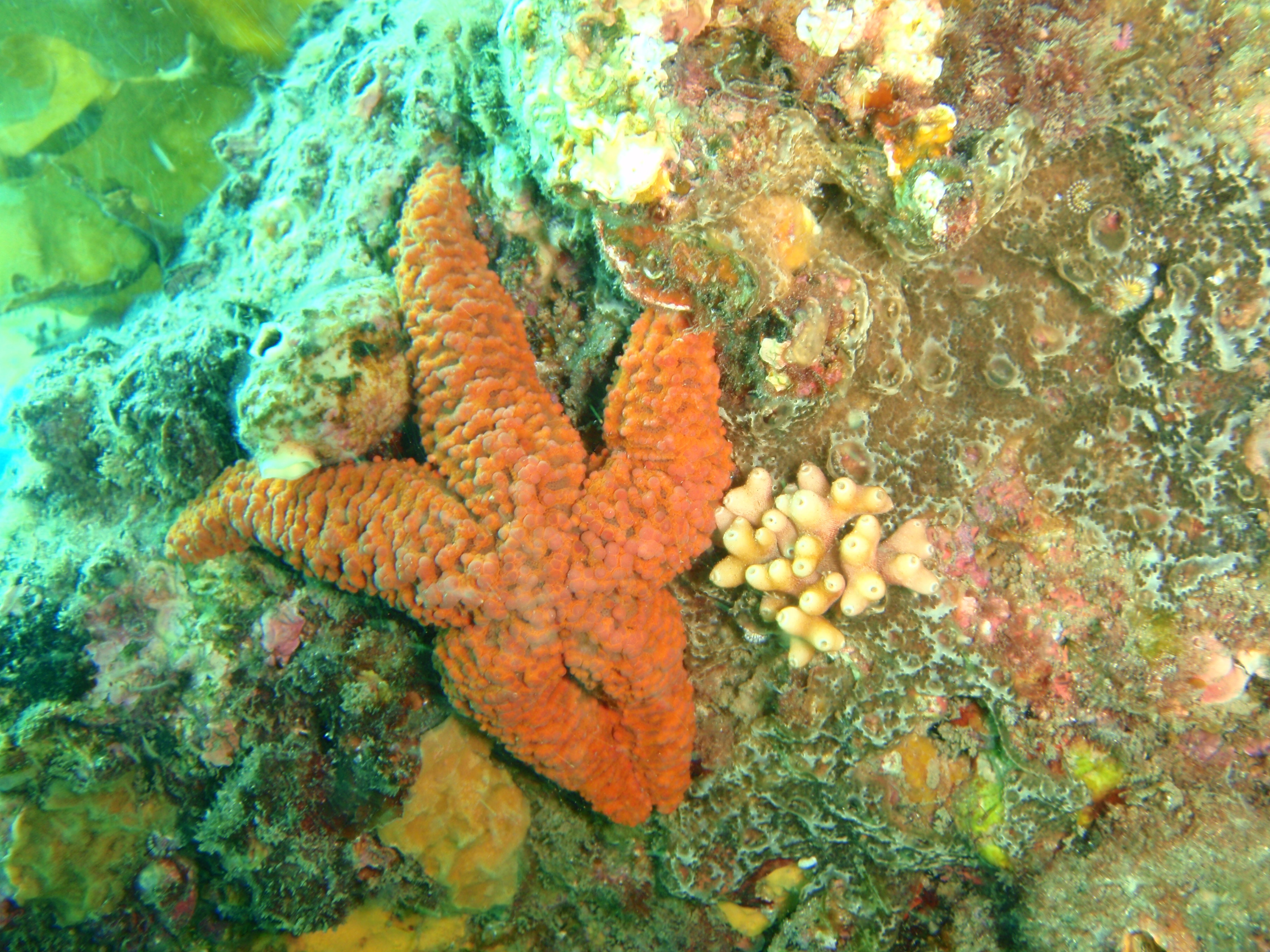
Uniophora nuda
