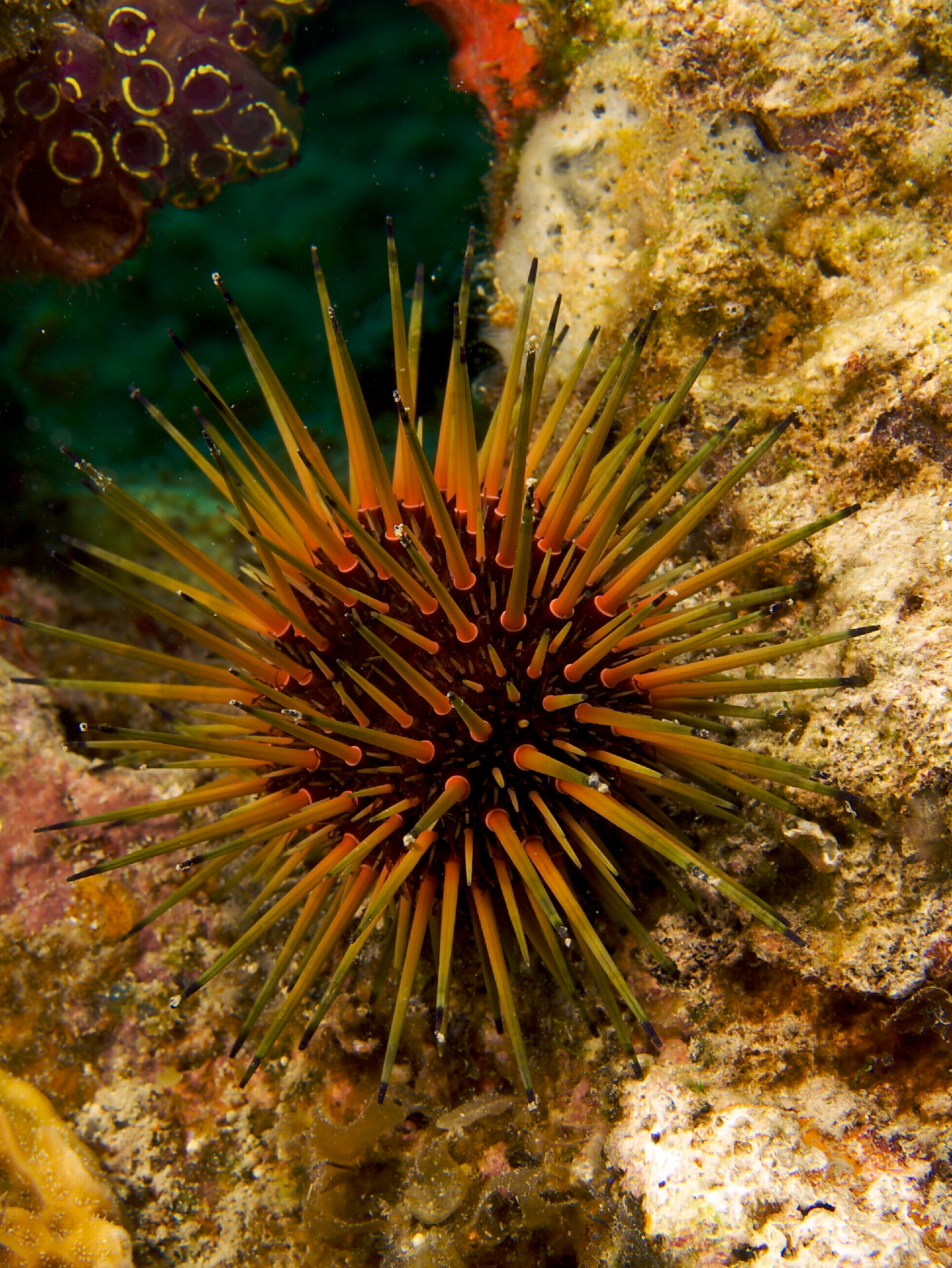

Scientific classification
- Kingdom: Animalia
- Phylum: Echinodermata
- Class: Echinoidea
- Order: Camarodonta
- Family: Echinometridae
- Genus: Echinometra
- Species: E. viridis

Binomial name
- Echinometra viridis A. Agassiz, 1863

Synonyms
- Echinometra plana A. Agassiz, 1863; Ellipsechinus viridis (A. Agassiz, 1863)

= Echinometra viridis =

Species of sea urchin

Echinometra viridis, the reef urchin, is a species of sea urchin in the family Echinometridae. It is found on reefs in very shallow parts of the western Atlantic Ocean and the Caribbean Sea.

== Description ==
The reef urchin has an elliptical reddish brown test (shell) covered with medium length spines. These are greenish in colour with paler bases and darker, often violet, tips. This urchin grows to a diameter of 5 centimetres (2.0 in) with the longest spines being 3 centimetres (1.2 in). It looks very similar to the rock-boring urchin Echinometra lucunter, but the dark tips and the greater length of the spines are distinctive.

== Distribution ==
The reef urchin is found on reefs in the Caribbean Sea from southern Florida to Venezuela at depths down to about 15 metres (49 ft). It is not as common as the rock-boring urchin and seems to be absent from the West Indies to the east of the Virgin Islands.

== Biology ==
The reef urchin conceals itself in crevices or under boulders. It emerges at night to feed by grazing on algae with its five teeth, part of the Aristotle's lantern organ that surrounds its mouth. It is not believed to bore holes, but its grazing still causes bioerosion in reefs. In Panama, breeding takes place during the period April to December. It does not seem to be correlated with the phases of the moon as in some other sea urchin species. Fertilisation is external and the echinopluteus larvae are planktonic. When these settle, they undergo a rapid metamorphosis into juvenile sea urchins.

Researchers have studied the likely effect on the reef urchin of a rise in the carbon dioxide levels which are likely to increase ocean acidification by the end of the 21st century. It was found that the urchins would be negatively impacted because of decreased calcification, lowering their ability to build their tests, especially during winter and in the more northerly parts of their range.

== Ecology ==
The reef urchin is an important grazer on fleshy algae in the Caribbean area. Its abundance is reduced by predation by fish, especially the jolthead porgy (Calamus bajonado), the queen triggerfish (Balistes vetula), the ocean triggerfish (Canthidermis sufflamen) and the hogfish (Lachnolaimus maximus). Because of this predation, the reef urchin avoids open reef flats and in these locations there is an overgrowth of fleshy algae. It is unable to take over the algal controlling role of the black sea urchin (Diadema antillarum) which is subject to great fluctuations in population.
