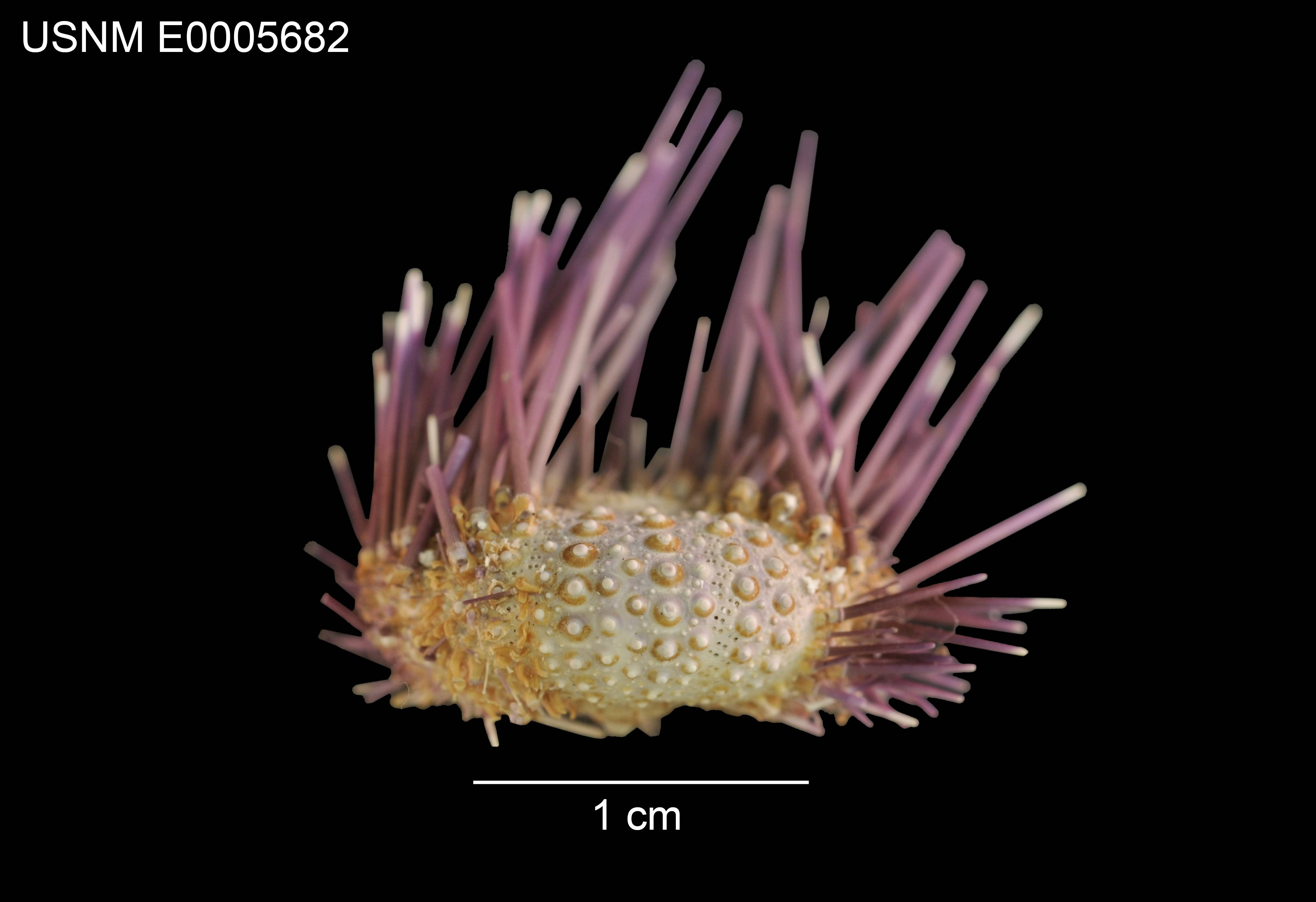

Scientific classification
- Kingdom: Animalia
- Phylum: Echinodermata
- Class: Echinoidea
- Order: Camarodonta
- Family: Echinometridae
- Genus: Echinostrephus
- Species: E. aciculatus

Binomial name
- Echinostrephus aciculatus A. Agassiz, 1863

= Echinostrephus aciculatus =

Species of echinoderm

Echinostrephus aciculatus is a species of sea urchin belonging to the family Echinometridae first documented by Alexander Emmanuel Rodolphe Agassiz in 1863.

== Description ==
These are regular urchins of canonical form, with the test mostly spherical, bearing a pentaradial symmetry from the mouth at the center of the oral face to the anus on the aboral face. Spines are thin, pointy and of average length.

The test measures from 2 to 4 centimetres (0.79 to 1.57 in) in diameter, and the color of the spines is very variable: they are often brown-purple, but can be shades of purple, brown, black, grey or off-white. Those on the oral face can also have a cream color with brown-purple rings, although they are rarely visible. The test ranges from black to light brown, with the bottom of the spines showing often highly contrasting rings. The apical disk is dark and lacking spines, forming a highly visible disk at the apex of the test.

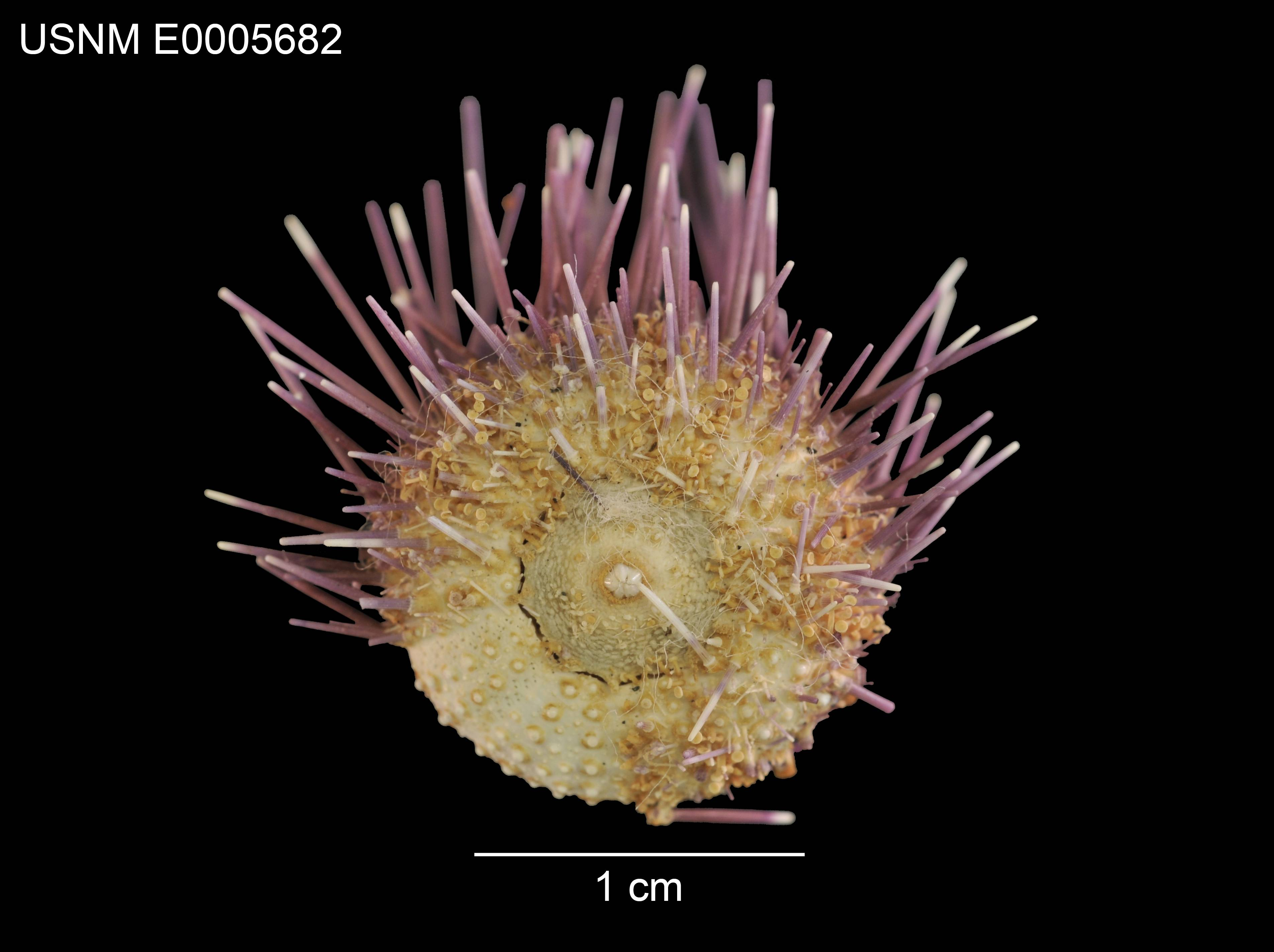
Oral view

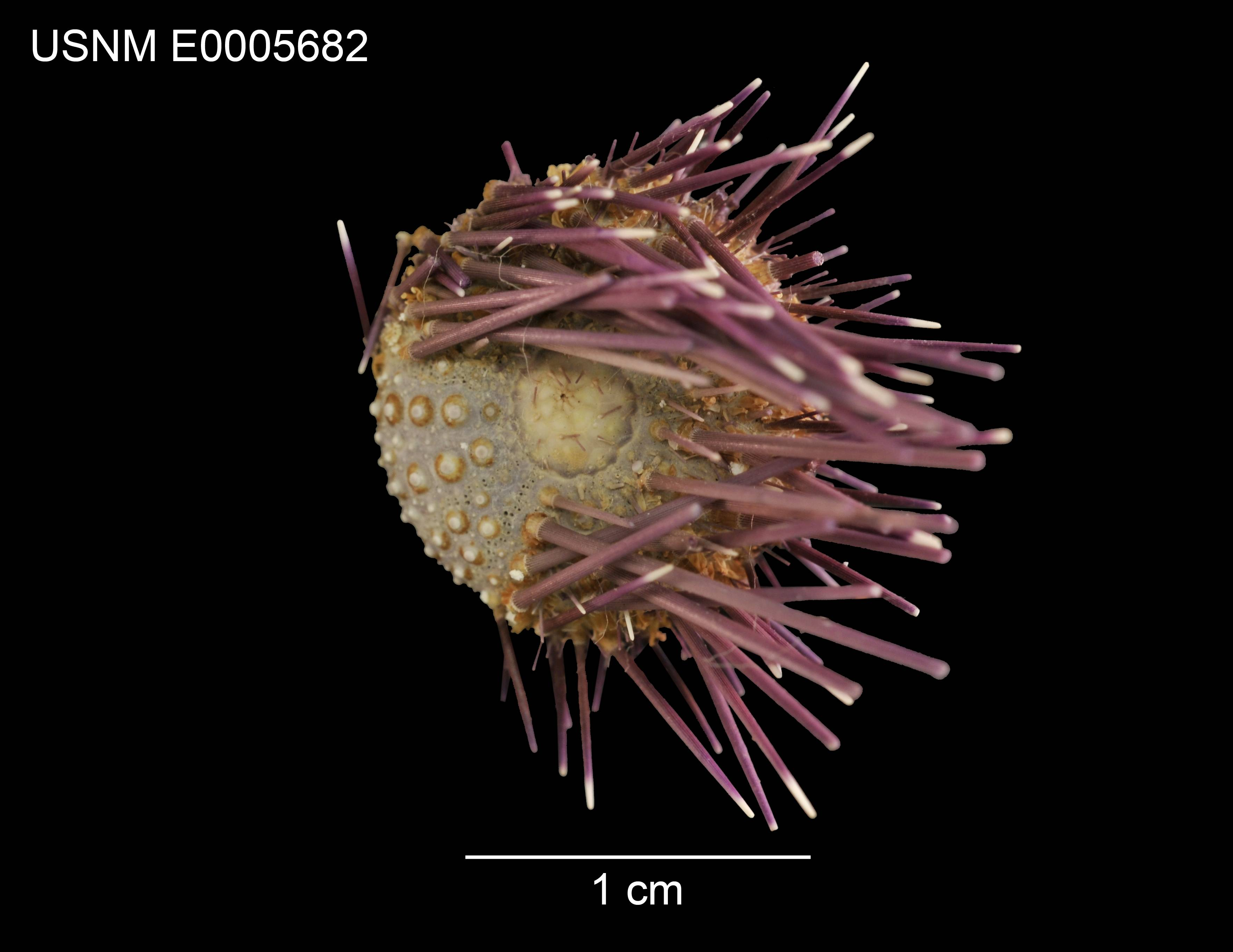
Aboral view

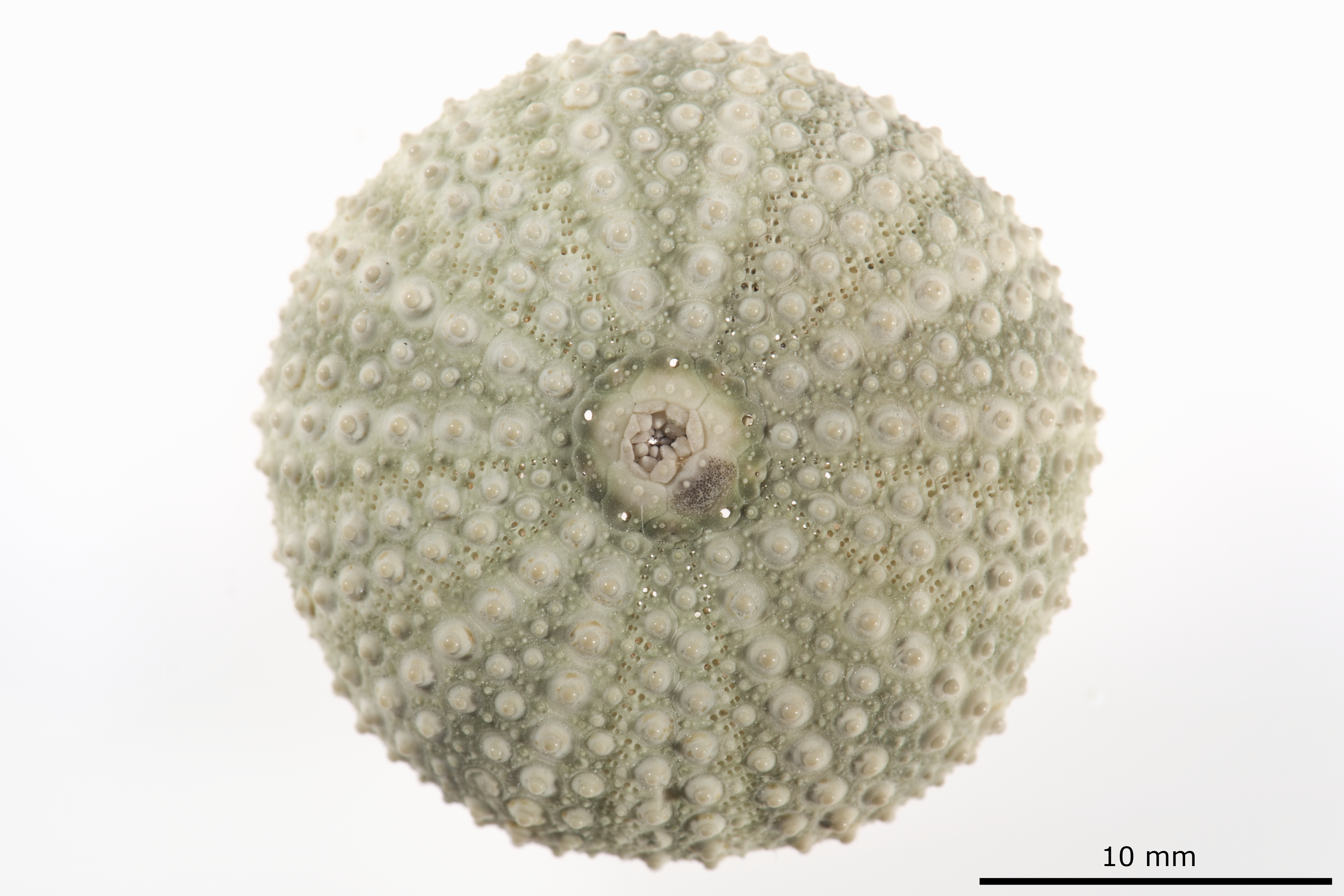
Spineless test
