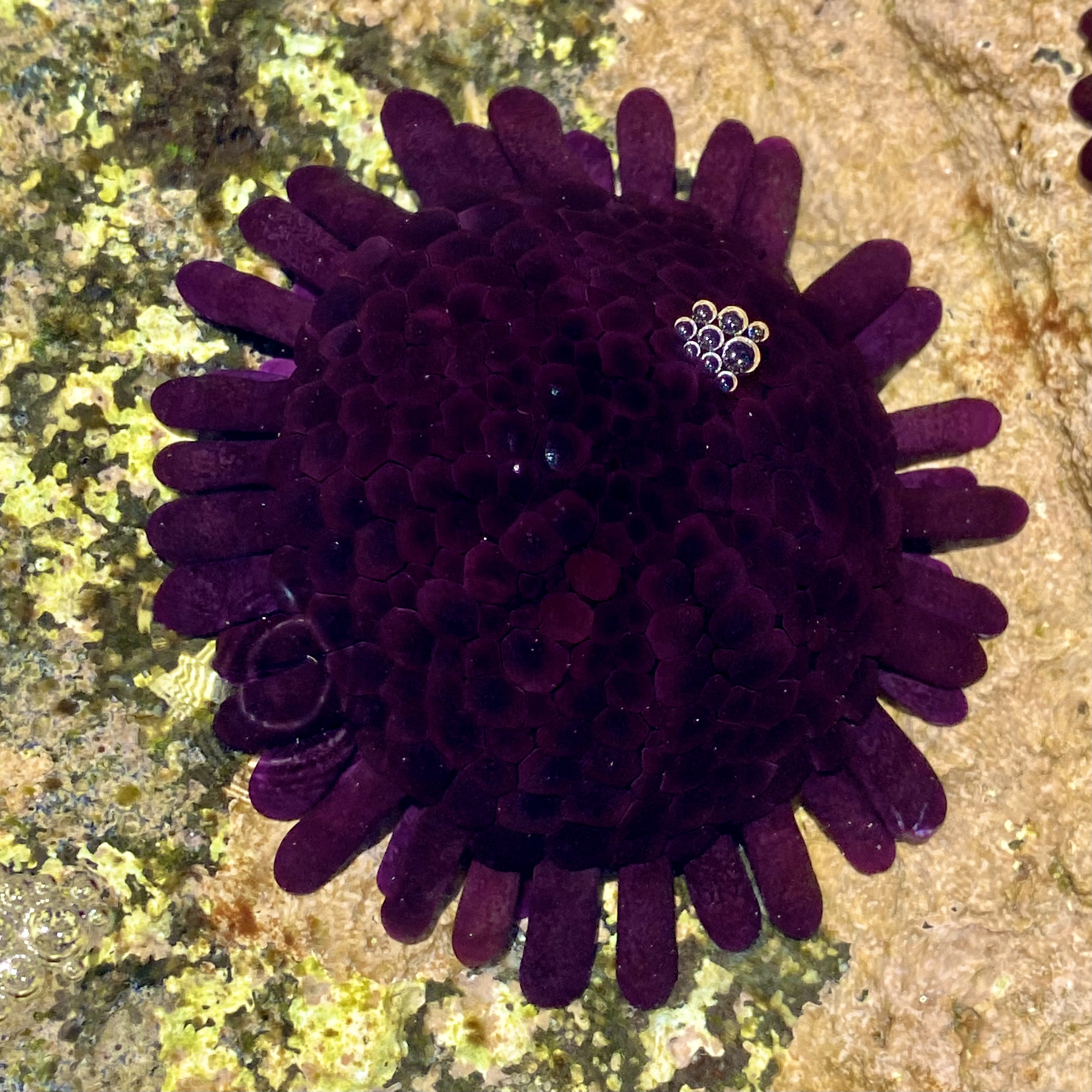
- Colobocentrotus atratus on the island of Hawaii

Scientific classification
- Kingdom: Animalia
- Phylum: Echinodermata
- Class: Echinoidea
- Order: Camarodonta
- Family: Echinometridae
- Genus: Colobocentrotus
- Species: C. atratus

Binomial name
- Colobocentrotus atratus (Linnaeus, 1758)

Synonyms
- Podophora atrata Linnaeus, 1758

= Colobocentrotus atratus =

Species of sea urchin

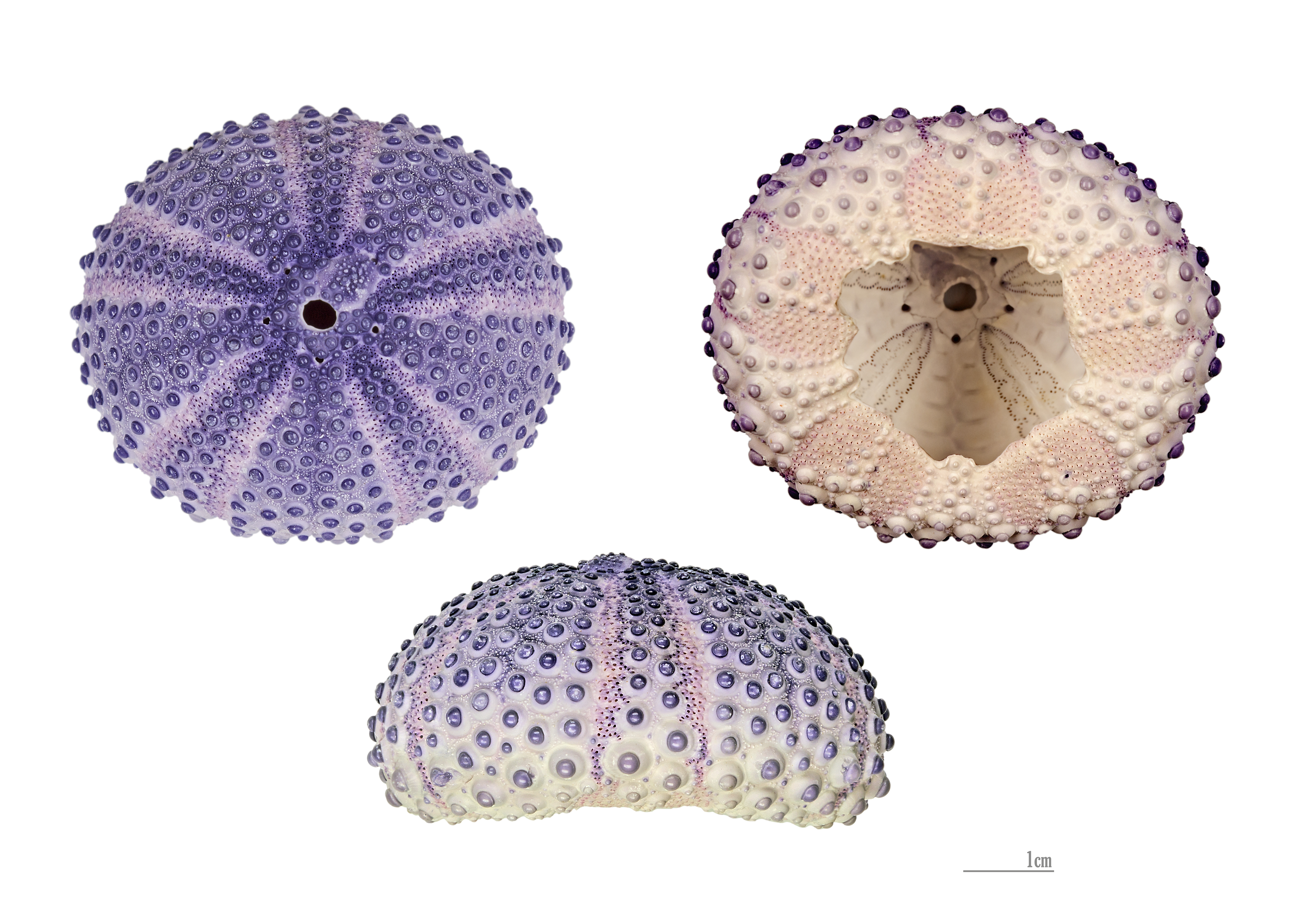
Colobocentrotus Atratus sample. (MHNT)

Colobocentrotus atratus, commonly named the helmet urchin or shingle urchin, is a species of sea urchin in the family Echinometridae. In Hawaii, it is called hāʻukeʻuke. It is found on wave-swept intertidal shores in the Indo-West Pacific, particularly on the shores of Hawaii.

== Description ==
This urchin is a deep maroon colour and shaped like a domed limpet. It can grow to the size of a softball, but is usually much smaller. The upper surface is a mosaic of tiny polygonal plates formed from modified spines to form a smooth mosaic. This is fringed by a ring of large, flattened modified spines. On the underside there is another ring of smaller flattened spines and a large number of tube feet.

== Biology ==
This urchin is usually found on substrates fully exposed to waves and their associated abrasive effect, often in groups. It feeds on periwinkles, other urchins and coralline algae.

In a test comparing shingle urchins to other species of urchin, it was found that their ability to withstand being washed away by moving water excelled. A combination of their shape, their flattened spines and particularly the strong adhesion of their tube feet made them three times as resistant as other species such as Echinometra. This enables them to live on inhospitable wave-battered shorelines.
