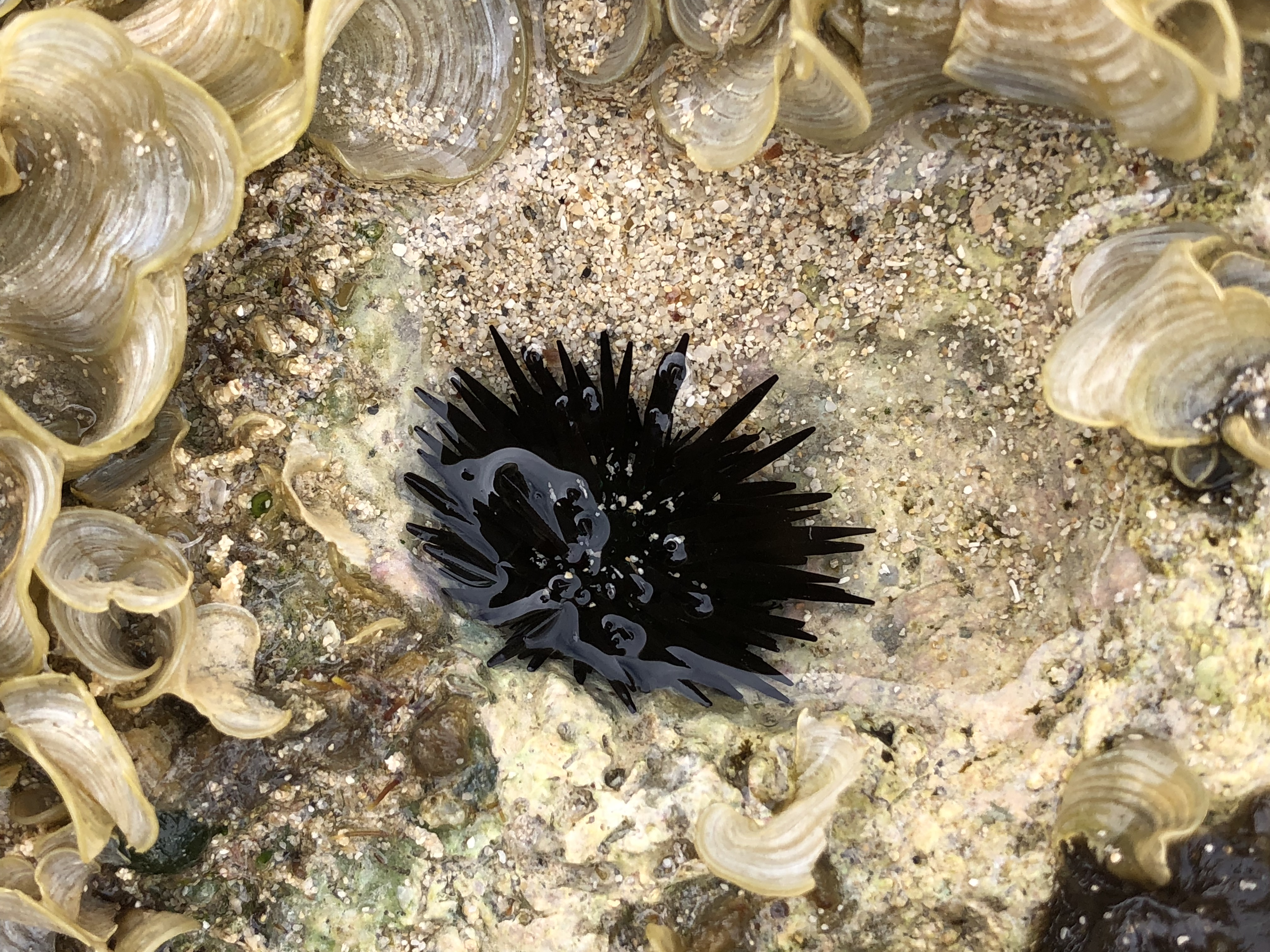

Scientific classification
- Kingdom: Animalia
- Phylum: Echinodermata
- Class: Echinoidea
- Order: Camarodonta
- Family: Echinometridae
- Genus: Echinometra
- Species: E. oblonga

Binomial name
- Echinometra oblonga Blainville, 1825

Synonyms
- Echinometra mathaei oblonga (Blainville, 1825); Echinus oblonga (misspelling); Echinus oblongus Blainville, 1825; Ellipsechinus oblongus (Blainville, 1825); Mortensenia oblonga (Blainville, 1825)

= Echinometra oblonga =

Species of sea urchin

Echinometra oblonga, also called the oblong urchin or 'ina 'ele 'ele (ina= generic name for urchin, 'ele 'ele= blackish) in Hawaiian, is a very common rock boring urchin on shallow rocky shores of the tropical Indo-Pacific and Southern Africa.

== Description ==
Echinometra oblonga shows a range of color from dark purple to black. Their spines are shorter, and more blunt than other species of Echinometra.

== Reproduction ==
Echinometra oblonga, are gonochoric. They fertilize externally. Their eggs are either held on the peristome or around the periproct.

== Habitat ==
Echinometra oblonga generally live in rougher-water areas of tropical reefs. To protect themselves from the force of the waves, they live in the holes of the reef, but they also live on exposed reef flats. As the urchin grows, they use their jaws to help enlarge holes in the reef. Their spines trap seaweed and algae from the reef, which they then transfer to the mouth.
