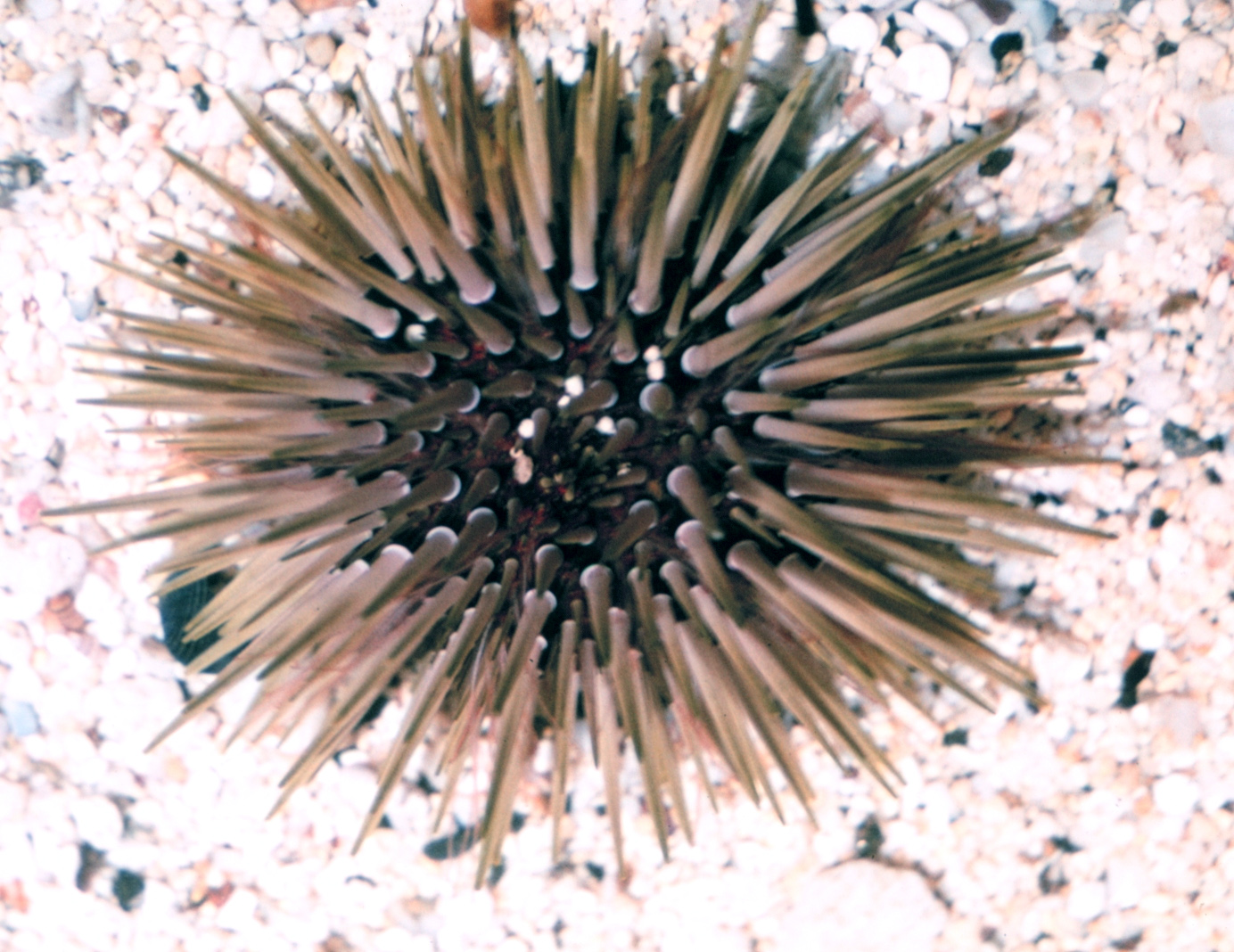

Scientific classification
- Kingdom: Animalia
- Phylum: Echinodermata
- Class: Echinoidea
- Order: Camarodonta
- Family: Echinometridae
- Genus: Echinometra
- Species: E. mathaei

Binomial name
- Echinometra mathaei Blainville, 1825

Synonyms
- Echinometra brunea A. Agassiz, 1863; Echinometra heteropora A. Agassiz & Desor, 1846; Echinometra megastoma M'Clelland, 1840; Echinometra microtuberculata A. Agassiz, 1863; Echinometra picta A. Agassiz & H.L. Clark, 1907; Echinus mathaei Blainville, 1825; Ellipsechinus decaryi Lambert, 1933; Ellipsechinus matheyi; Ellipsechinus pictus (A. Agassiz & H.L. Clark, 1907)

= Echinometra mathaei =

Species of sea urchin

Echinometra mathaei, the burrowing urchin, is a species of sea urchin in the family Echinometridae. It occurs in shallow waters in the Indo-Pacific region. The type locality is Mauritius.

== Description ==
Echinometra mathaei grows to a test diameter of about 5 centimetres (2.0 in). The colour is quite variable but the test is usually a dark colour. The spines are sometimes green and purple with purple tips or entirely green with purple tips but this sea urchin can be distinguished from other species by a characteristic pale ring at the base of each spine.

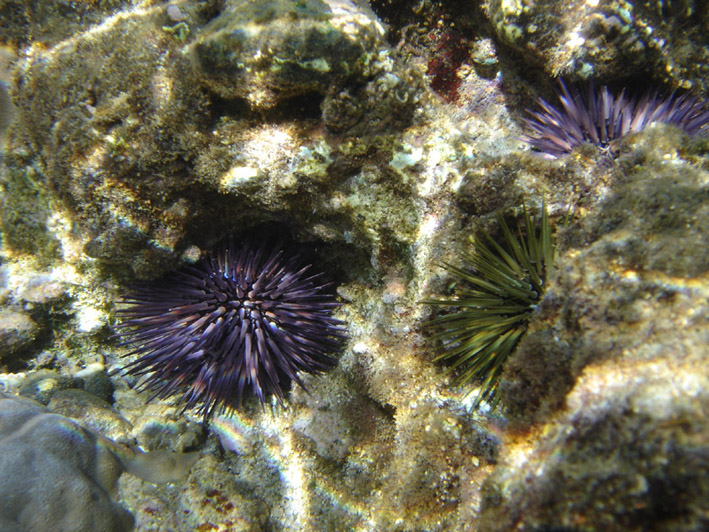
Echinometra mathaei in their holes in a rock.

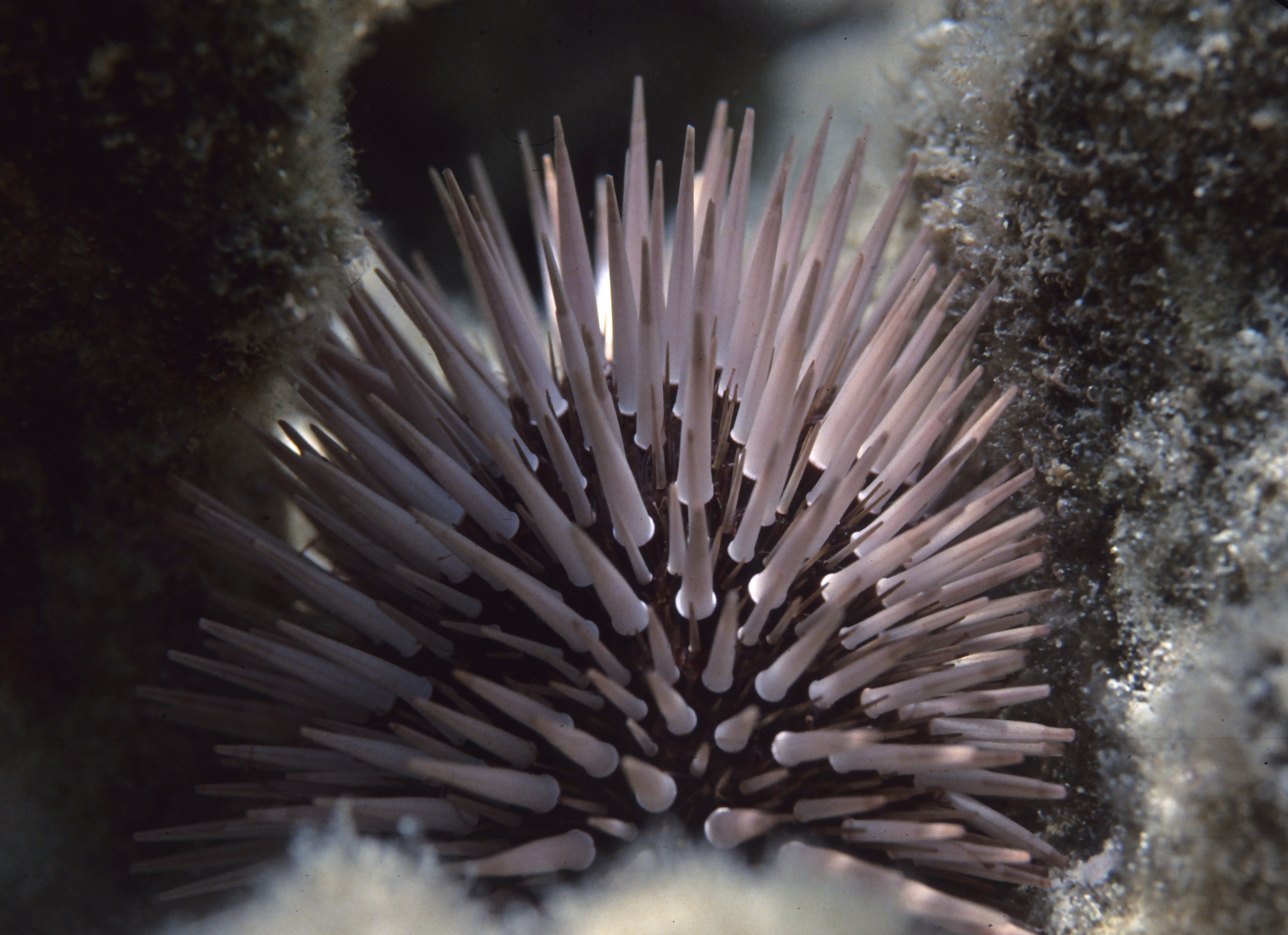

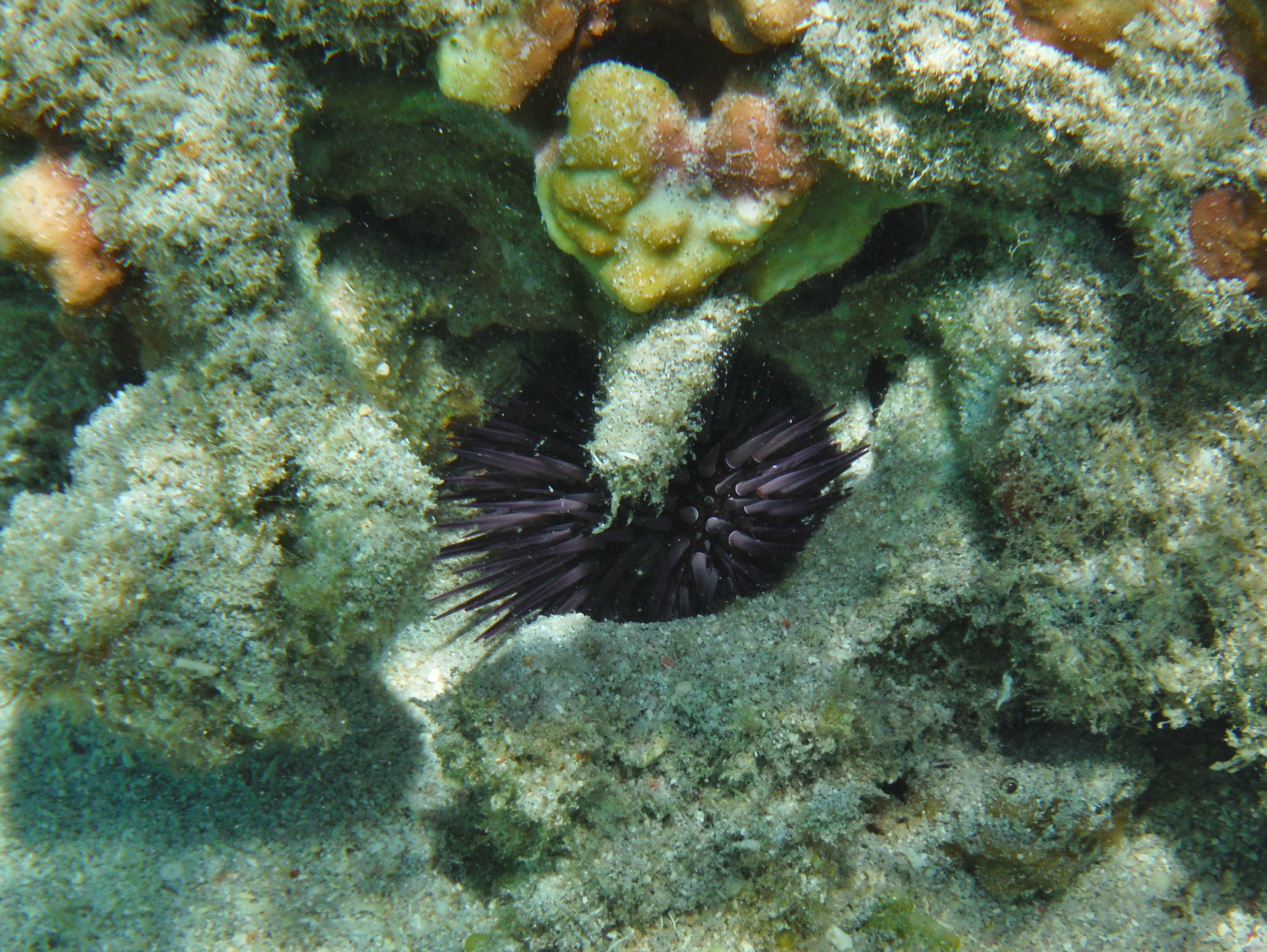
idem.

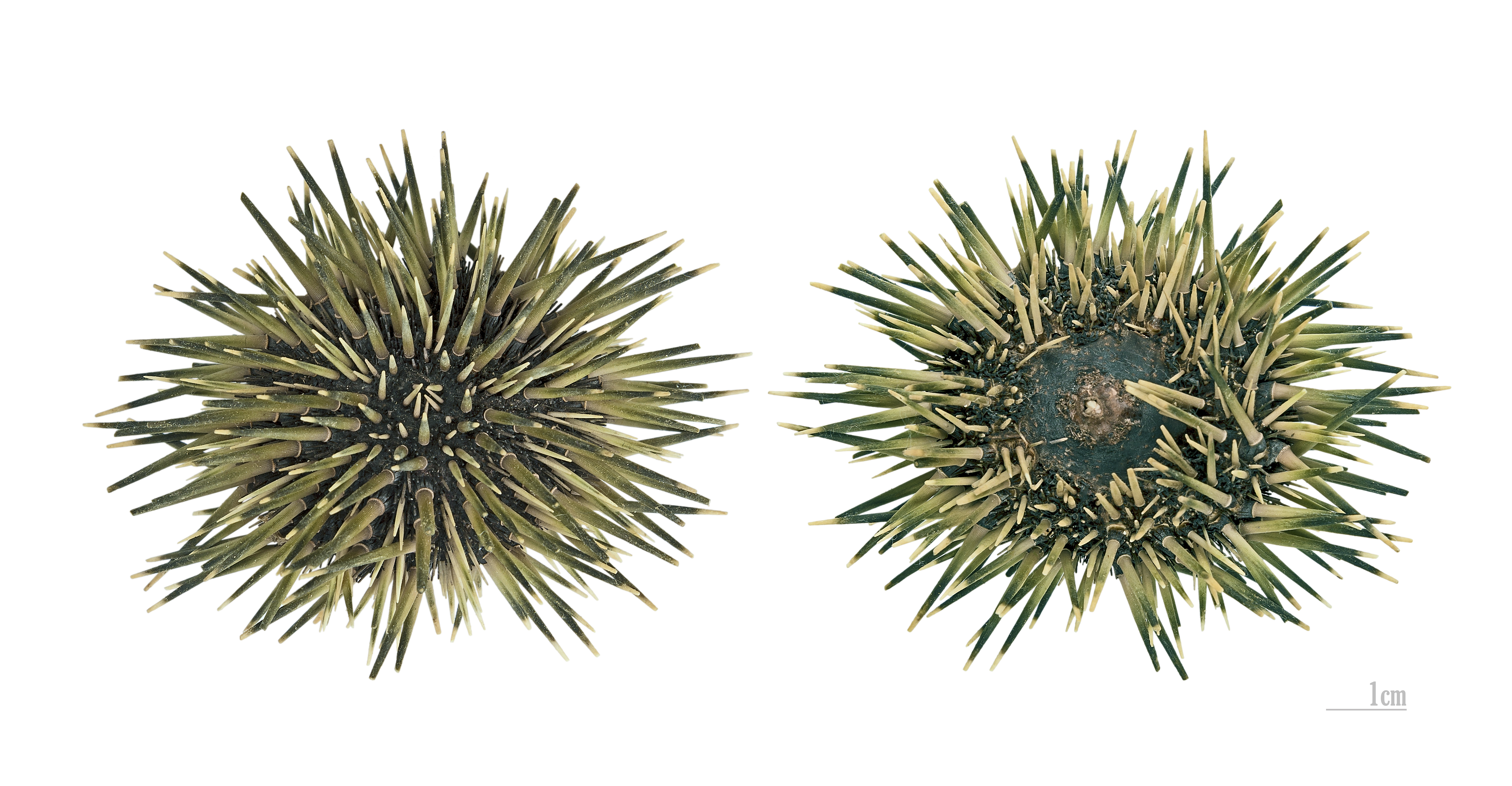
The two sides of the same dried specimen (MHNT)

== Distribution ==
Echinometra mathaei is found on reefs in tropical parts of the Indo-Pacific Ocean at depths down to 139 metres (456 ft). Its range extends from Madagascar, the East African coast and the Red Sea to Hawaii.

== Biology ==
Echinometra mathaei uses its spines and teeth (part of the mouthparts known as Aristotle's lantern) to dig itself into the basaltic and calcareous rock where it lives. It emerges from these hollows at night to graze on algae. As with other sea urchins, breeding involves releasing gametes into the water column. Fertilisation is external and the echinopluteus larvae are planktonic. When these settle on the seabed, they undergo metamorphosis into juvenile sea urchins. In the Gulf of Suez, in the most northerly part of its range, it spawns in the summer and autumn but in warmer waters, breeding takes place at any time of year.

Because of its burrowing activities, Echinometra mathaei causes bioerosion of coral reefs. Its natural predators are mostly finfish but there is also some predation by brittle stars and gastropod molluscs. It has been found that in areas where heavy fishing takes place, the number of urchins is increased because their natural predators are less abundant and as a consequence, greater damage to the reef takes place.

A commensal shrimp, Athanas areteformi, lives among the spines of this sea urchin and its appearance is mimicked by the mantis shrimp, Echinosquilla guerinii, which conceals itself in a hole in the rock with only its spiny telson visible.

Copper is having a detrimental effect to larvae at 0.02 mg/L, and adults have 48- and 96-h TL_{50} values of 0.54 and 0.30 mg/L. Fertilization success was also reduced to 50% in 0.18 mg/L, and cleavage of the 8-cell stage as well, at 0.42 mg/L of Cu^{++}.
