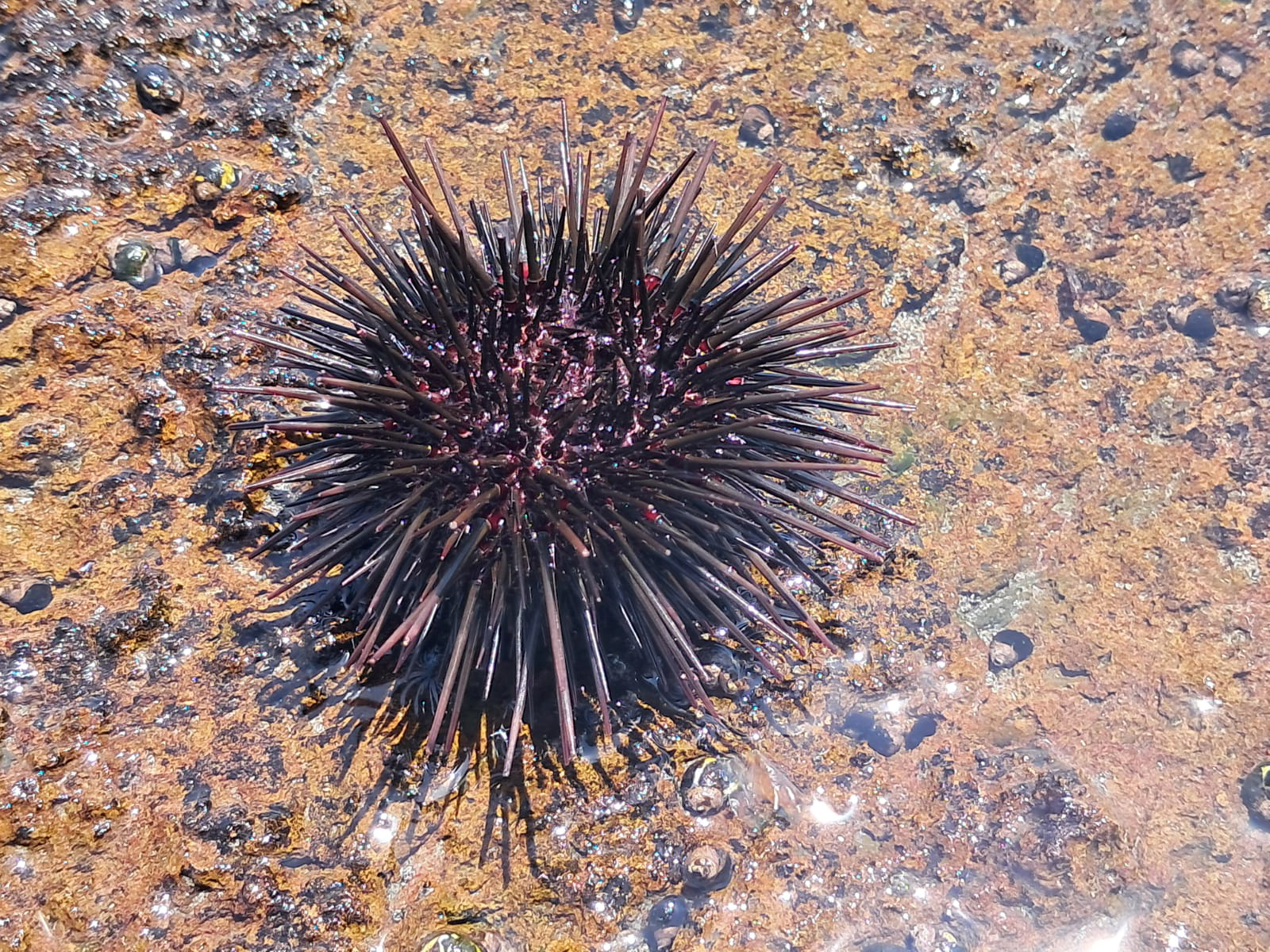

Scientific classification
- Kingdom: Animalia
- Phylum: Echinodermata
- Class: Echinoidea
- Order: Camarodonta
- Family: Echinometridae
- Genus: Caenocentrotus
- Species: C. gibbosus

Binomial name
- Caenocentrotus gibbosus (L. Agassiz, in L. Agassiz & Desor, 1846)

= Caenocentrotus =

Species of sea urchin

Caenocentrotus is a monotypic genus of sea urchins of the family Echinometridae. Its sole accepted species is Caenocentrotus gibbosus, a spine-covered urchin first scientifically described in 1846 by Agassiz, in L. Agassiz & Desor. It has been documented in the eastern Pacific, on the coasts of Peru, Ecuador, and the Galápagos Islands.
