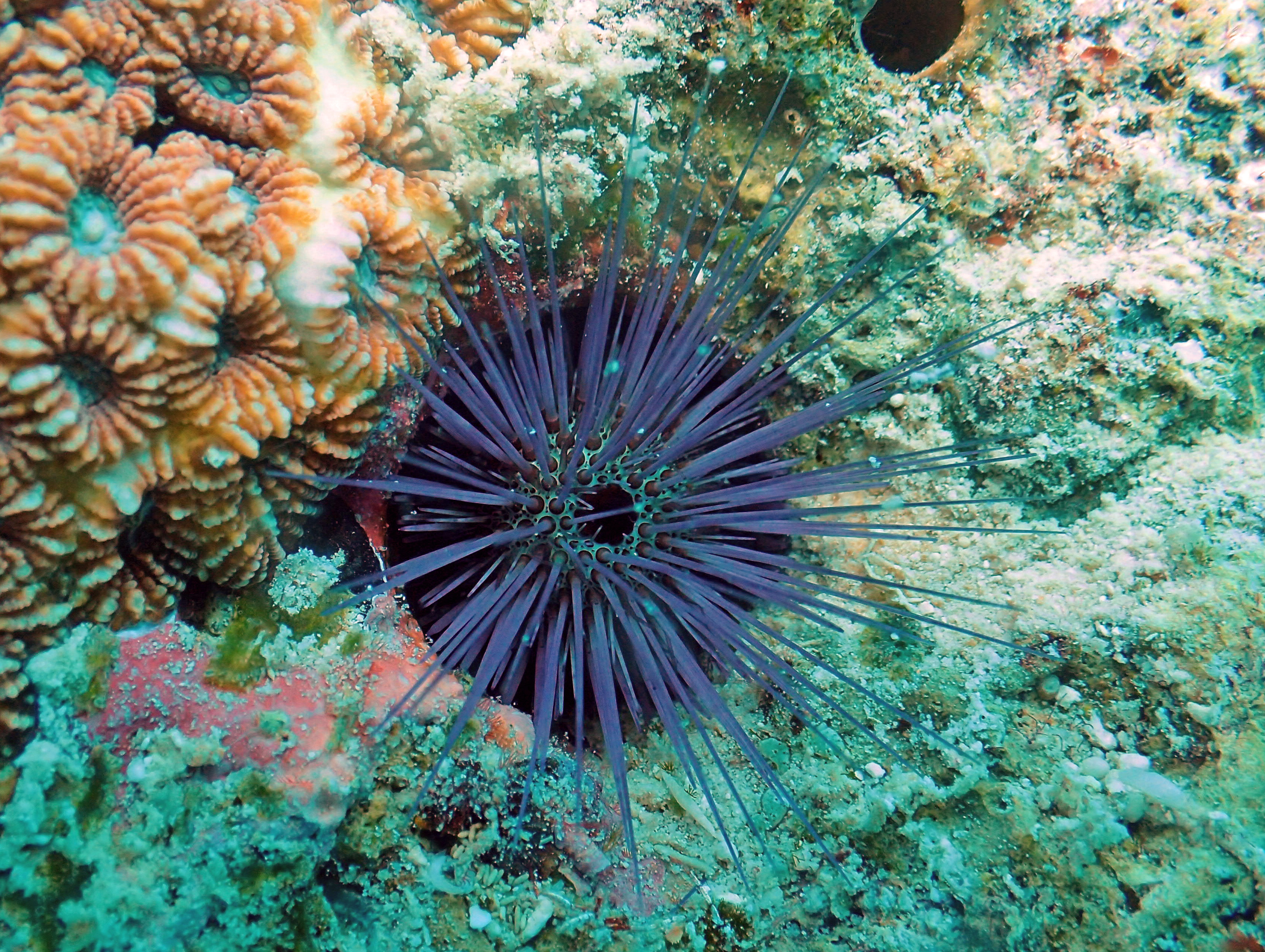

Scientific classification
- Kingdom: Animalia
- Phylum: Echinodermata
- Class: Echinoidea
- Order: Camarodonta
- Family: Echinometridae
- Genus: Echinostrephus
- Species: E. molaris

Binomial name
- Echinostrephus molaris (Blainville, 1825)

= Echinostrephus molaris =

Species of echinoderm

Echinostrephus molaris is a species of echinoderms belonging to the family Echinometridae.

The species is found in Indian and Pacific Ocean.
