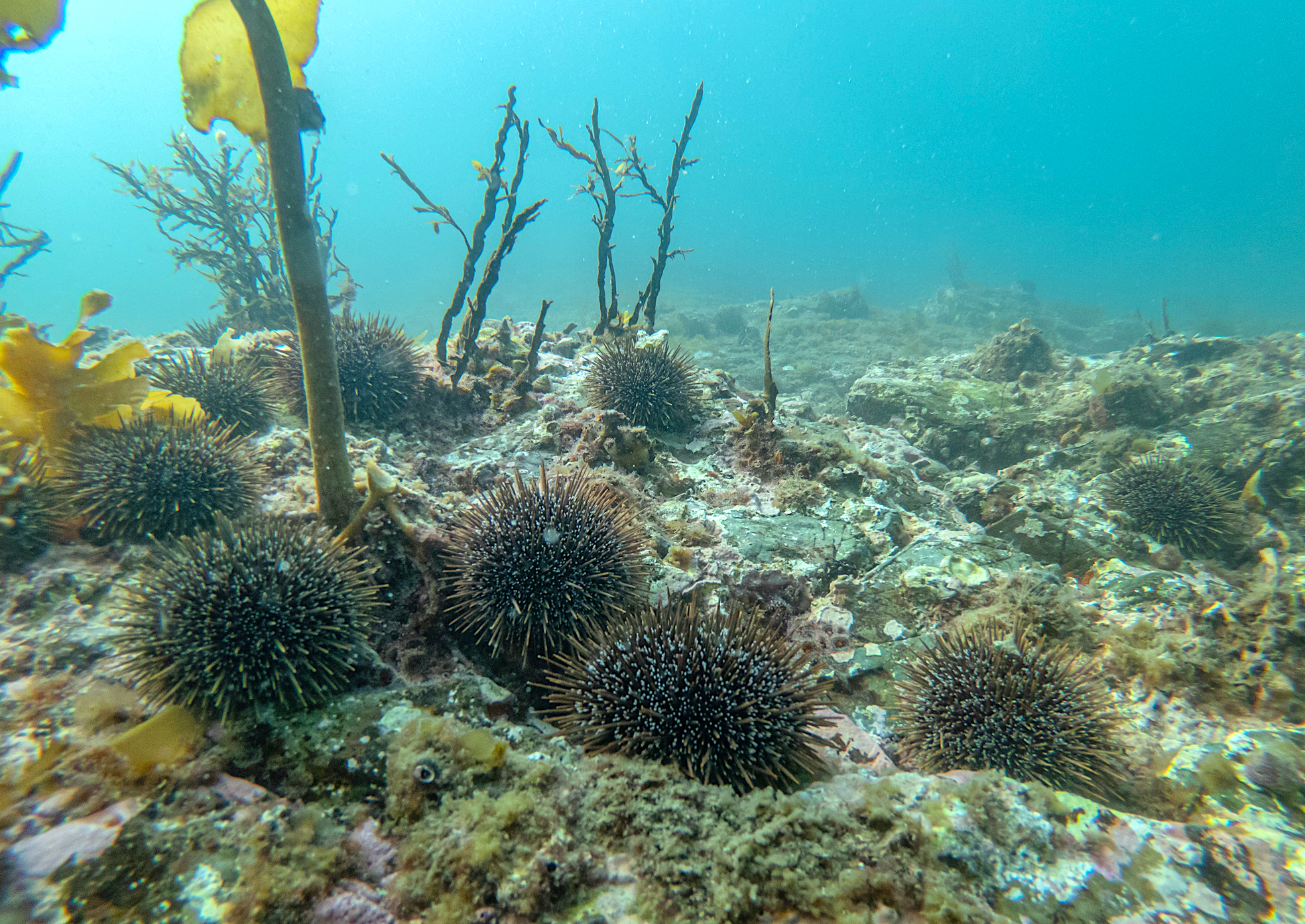
- Kina feeding on kelp causing a kina barren near the Noises in the Hauraki Gulf

Scientific classification
- Kingdom: Animalia
- Phylum: Echinodermata
- Class: Echinoidea
- Order: Camarodonta
- Family: Echinometridae
- Genus: Evechinus
- Species: E. chloroticus

Binomial name
- Evechinus chloroticus Valenciennes, 1846

= Evechinus chloroticus =

Species of sea urchin

Evechinus chloroticus, commonly known as the common sea urchin, sea egg or kina, is a sea urchin endemic to New Zealand. This echinoderm belongs to the family Echinometridae and it can reach a maximum diameter of 16–17 cm.

Kina populations throughout New Zealand have dramatically grown due to the effects of overfishing and climate change, resulting in over-grazing that significantly damages kelp forest ecosystems. Kina are now being actively removed from many ecosystems for marine conservation efforts.

Kina have been a traditional component of Māori diet since pre-European times and has been fished commercially since 1986 in small quantities under the quota management system in restricted areas along the coast of New Zealand. Attempts to export E. chloroticus to Asian markets have been unsuccessful, so it may not be an economically attractive species for aquaculture development.

Evechinus chloroticus is distributed throughout New Zealand and in some northern and southern offshore islands. It is the most common sea urchin species in New Zealand.

== Names ==
In English, Evechinus chloroticus is commonly known as the common sea urchin, kina or sea egg. In the indigenous Māori language, the urchin itself is known as kina (with kina ariki referring to long-spiked urchins) or pūrau, the urchin's roe is known as ateate.

== Description ==
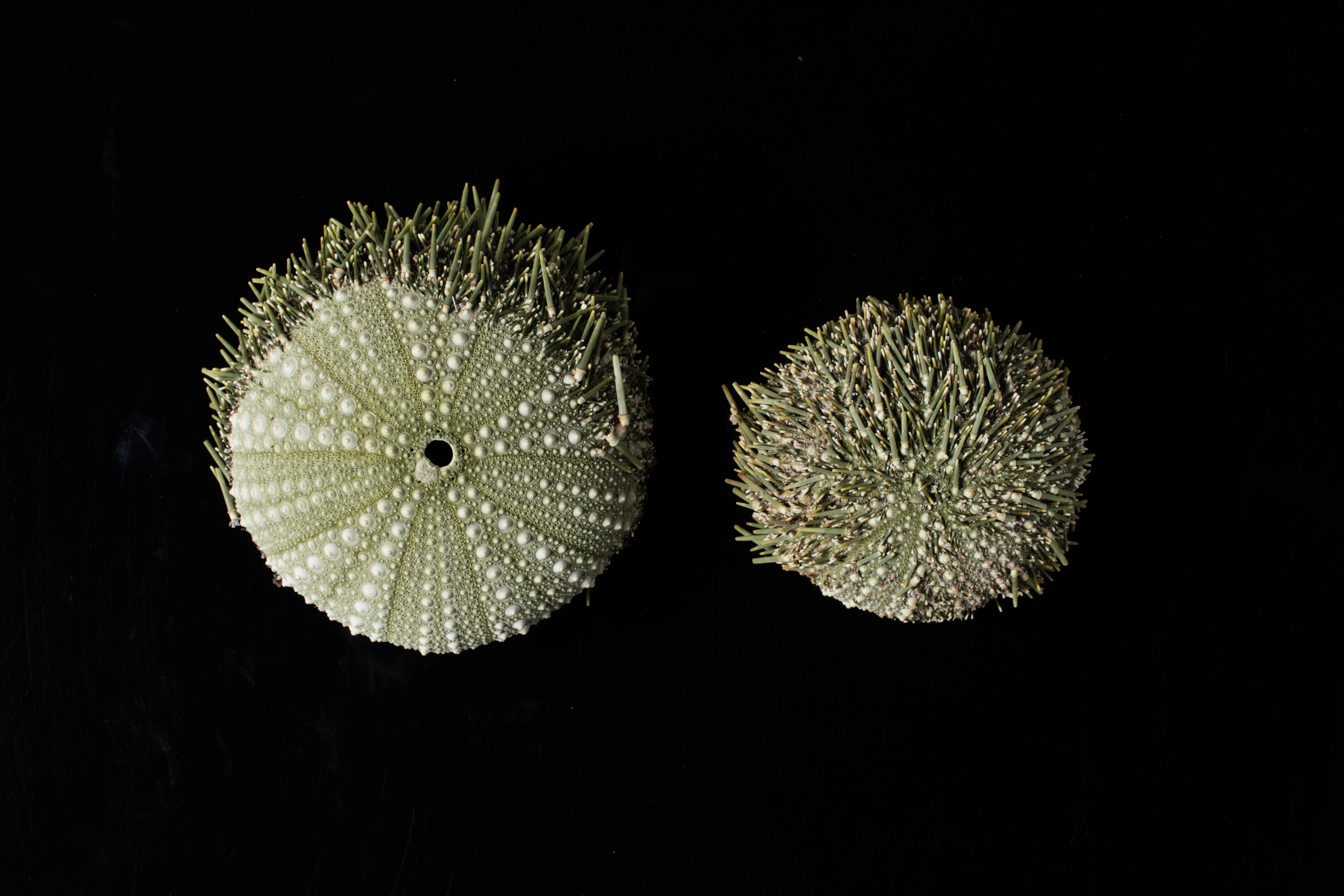
The shell of Evechinus chloroticus, with some spines remaining attached to the shell

Evechinus chloroticus is oval in shape, covered by a large number of spines, which are used as protection. In between the spines are a number of tube feet, which help kina to propel themselves along the seafloor.

== Habitat ==
This sea urchin is found all around New Zealand in shallow waters and up to 12–14 metres deep, although there are also intertidal populations in the north of both the North and South Islands.

Evechinus chloroticus prefers areas with moderate wave action. In the north of New Zealand it is found mostly on rocky seafloor areas but also in areas of sandy seafloor. In the South Island it is also found in abundant densities throughout the fiords.

Individuals smaller than 1 cm of diameter are found attached under both intertidal and subtidal rocks, whereas individuals between 1–4 cm are found in intertidal and subtidal areas under the rocks, or within small depressions in rocks. After the sea urchins reach 4 cm they migrate to open areas.

== Diet ==
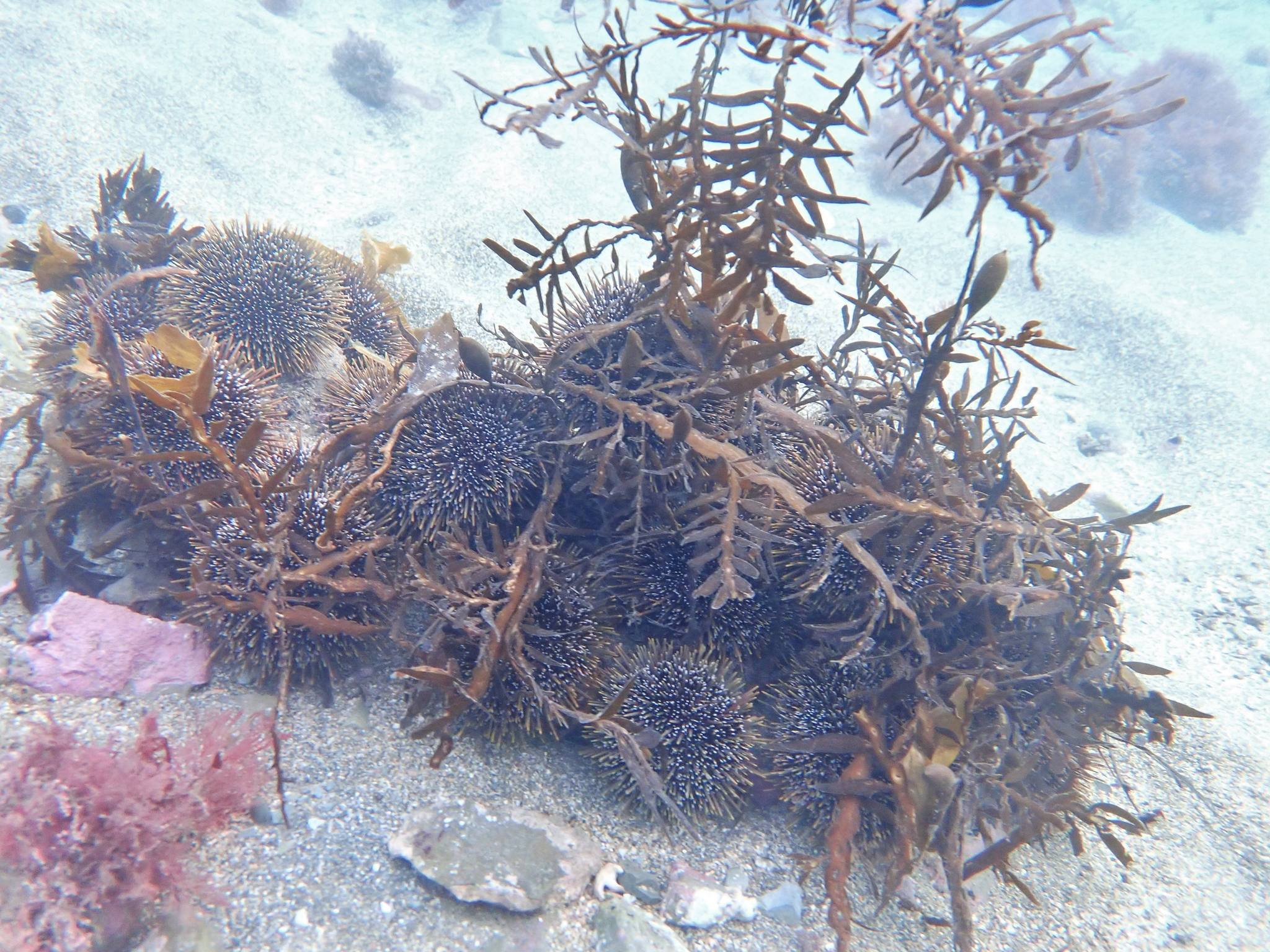
Evechinus chloroticus feeding on brown kelp

Evechinus chloroticus is mainly herbivorous, feeding on large brown algae, red algae and encrusting substrate. Larval stages can feed on different species of unicellular algae in a size range between 5 and 50 μm.

== Predators ==
Molluscs such as the cymatiid gastropods Charonia capax and Charonia rubicunda, starfish, and benthic feeding fishes can feed on individuals of E. chloroticus. The most important predators are the eleven-armed sea star, Coscinasterias calamaria, the seven-armed prickly starfish Astrostole scabra, the spiny lobsterJasus edwardsii and Snapper.

== Reproduction ==
Evechinus chloroticus has an annual breeding cycle. It becomes sexually mature between 3.5 and 7.5 cm in diameter, depending on the population. Gonads are ripe from October and individuals can spawn from November to February.

Swimming larvae complete development in the water column between 4 and 6 weeks. Other studies related to larval development report development in the laboratory can take between 22 and 30 days. The larvae of E. chloroticus are known to settle on substrates covered with coralline algal species, such as Corallina officinalis as well as artificial surfaces. High sedimentation loads in the water column, such as those associated with residential construction, have a negative effect on settling sea urchins.

Evechinus chloroticus can grow between 0.8 and 1 cm in diameter only in its first year of life, and growth rate of in wild populations has been reported between 1–2 cm in diameter annually.

== In a human context ==
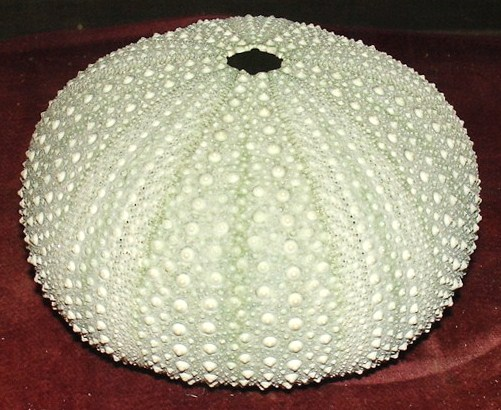
Kina shells have become a symbol of the beach in New Zealand.

Kina are a traditional food for Māori, often eaten raw from the sea. Kina were known to develop a bitter taste during much of the year, with the blooming of the kōwhai in spring or pōhutukawa in summer indicating times when the roe was particularly palatable.

Kina shells, also known as tests, have become a symbol of coastal New Zealand. The shells have been used in crafts, such as ornaments and jewellery boxes.

=== Aquaculture ===
Sea urchin gonads are highly prized in some Asian and European seafood markets where demand has been increasing. In the New Zealand market, the roe can reach NZ$70 per kg. However, because E. chloroticus is not well known in Japan and has a reputation for having a bitter taste, this sea urchin is unable to reach a high price in export markets.

Despite the fact that E. chloroticus is not a profitable species for aquaculture, there are many studies on the complete culture of this species, especially relating to roe enhancement from fished sea urchins. There is strong interest in the production of good quality roe through roe enhancement, which could allow the export of them to markets such as Japan.

Roe enhancement for only nine weeks can give the greatest return for the lowest costs (feeding and maintenance). Also, it is more profitable to enhance sea urchins with low gonad index which are found in the North Island rather than the South Island.

The growth rate in juveniles of E. choloticus maintained in the laboratory is around 1 mm of diameter per month. Maturity in this species depends on the feed quality and availability rather than the sea urchin size. Therefore, it can reach maturity as small as 30 mm if it is fed with a prepared diet.

Artificial diets for sea urchins are well developed. However, more studies in appropriate artificial food for newly settled sea urchins are necessary as well as the design of systems for the nursery culture of post-settled sea urchins.

=== Environmental concerns ===
Many of the kina's natural predators, such as crayfish and snapper, have experienced population decline due to the effects of global warming and overfishing. This has increased kina population size all throughout New Zealand. Kina continue to multiply rapidly, even in their natural environment, caused by a lack of adequate predation. Once kina populations become out of control, kelp forest can be entirely eaten away, leaving bare rocks, also known as kina barrens. A notable example of a kina Barren is the Hauraki Gulf Marine Park, which after also experiencing overfishing, has been almost entirely stripped of other marine life.

== Toxicology ==
Copper has a detrimental effect on all stages of E. choloticus. For gametes, LOEC of >15 μg/L over one hour. For the pluteus stage, LOEC of 10.4 μg/L over 4 days. For adults, LOEC of 50 μg/L over 2 weeks.
