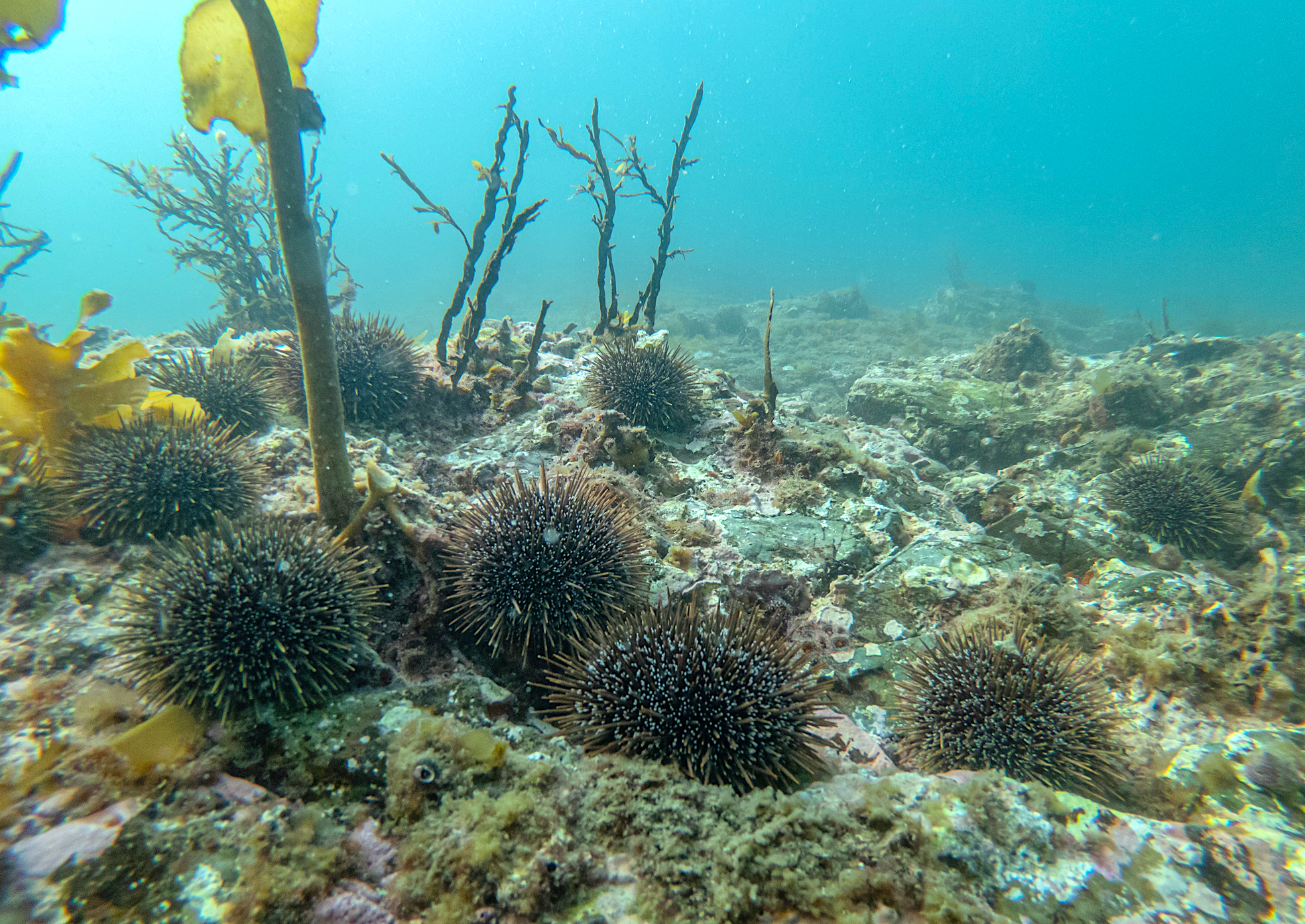
- Evechinus chloroticus

Scientific classification
- Kingdom: Animalia
- Phylum: Echinodermata
- Class: Echinoidea
- Order: Camarodonta
- Family: Echinometridae
- Genus: Evechinus; Verrill, 1871

= Evechinus =

Genus of echinoderms

Evechinus is a genus of echinoderms belonging to the family Echinometridae.

The species of this genus are found in New Zealand and Australia.

== Species ==
Species:

Image	Scientific name	Distribution
	Evechinus chloroticus (Valenciennes, 1846)	New Zealand.

=== Fossils ===
- † Evechinus palatus Philip, 1969
