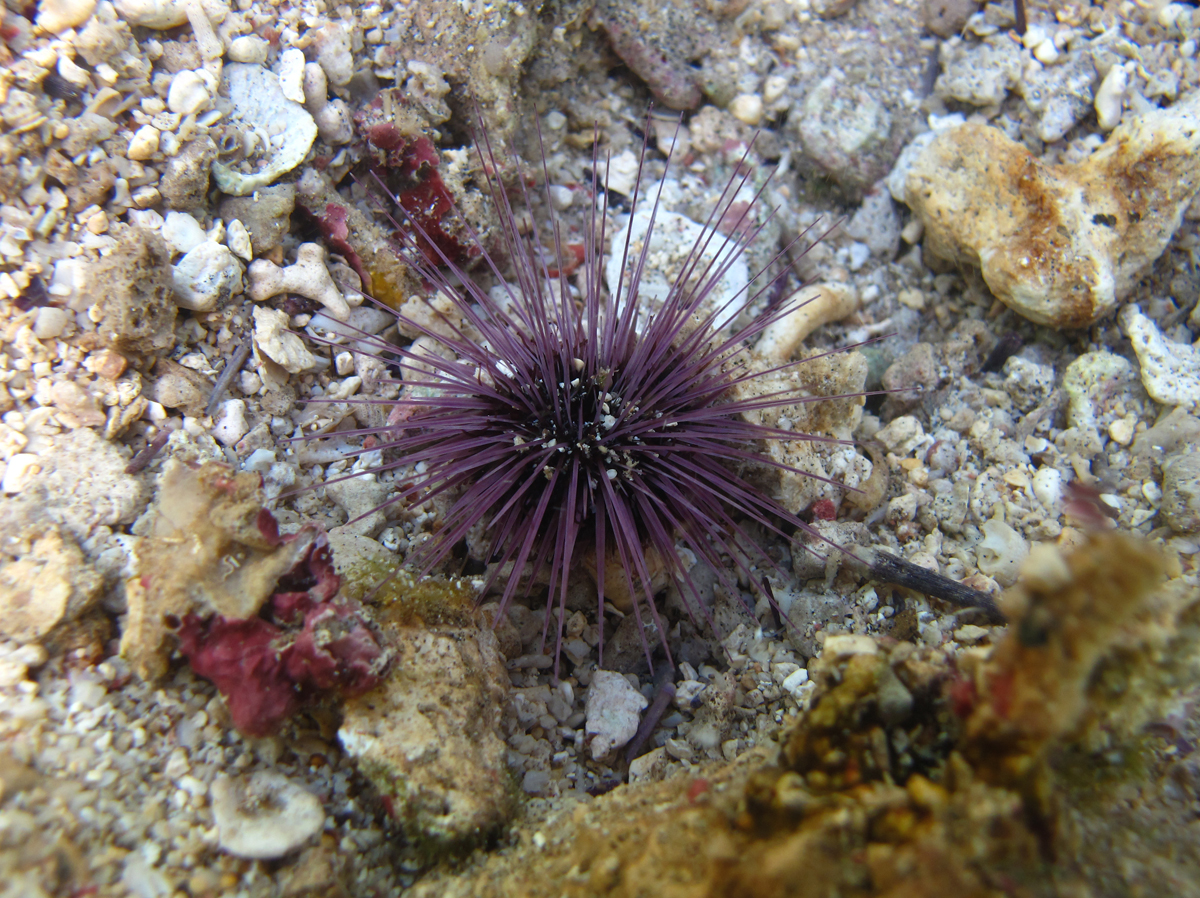
- Echinostrephus molaris

Scientific classification
- Kingdom: Animalia
- Phylum: Echinodermata
- Class: Echinoidea
- Order: Camarodonta
- Family: Echinometridae
- Genus: Echinostrephus; A. Agassiz, 1863

= Echinostrephus =

Genus of echinoderms

Echinostrephus is a genus of echinoderms belonging to the family Echinometridae.

The species of this genus are found in Indian and Pacific Ocean.

== Species ==
Species:

Image	Scientific name	Distribution
	Echinostrephus aciculatus Agassiz, 1863	Philippines to Japan, Hawaii, and Easter Island.
	Echinostrephus molaris (Blainville, 1825)	Indian and Pacific Ocean

== Fossils ==
- † Echinostrephus saipanicum Cooke, 1957
