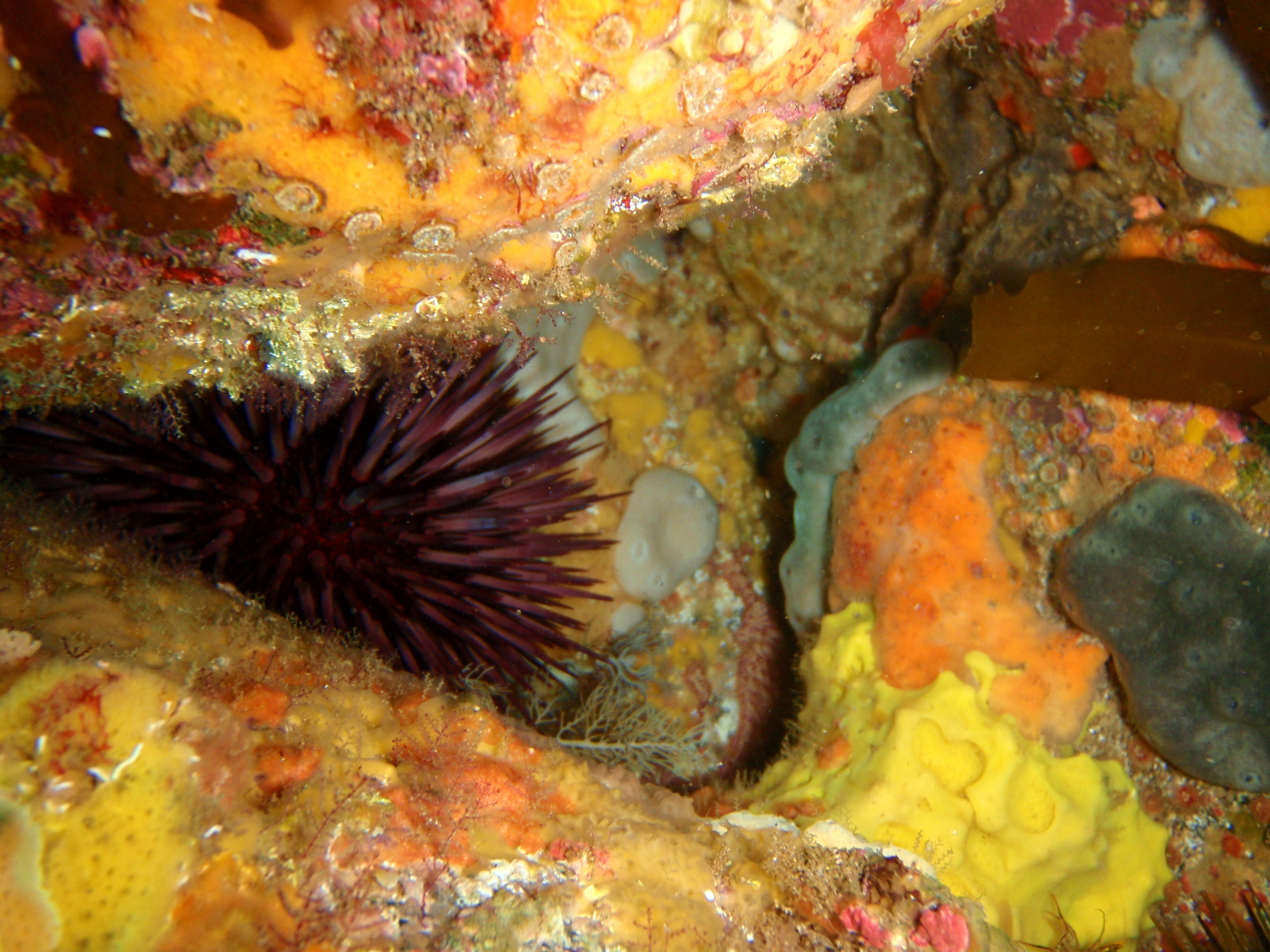
- Heliocidaris erythrogramma

Scientific classification
- Kingdom: Animalia
- Phylum: Echinodermata
- Class: Echinoidea
- Order: Camarodonta
- Family: Echinometridae
- Genus: Heliocidaris; L. Agassiz & Desor, 1846

= Heliocidaris =

Genus of sea urchins

Heliocidaris is a genus of sea urchins, part of the family Echinometridae.

== Characteristics ==
This genus is typical of west Pacific Ocean (Japan to New Zealand), in particular in Australia. Some species are edible.

== List of species ==
This genus contains 6 extant species and 1 fossil :

- Heliocidaris australiae (A. Agassiz, 1872)
- Heliocidaris bajulus (Dartnall, 1972)
- Heliocidaris crassispina (A. Agassiz, 1863)
- Heliocidaris erythrogramma (Valenciennes, 1846)
- Heliocidaris ludbrookae Philip, 1965 †
- Heliocidaris robertsi Lindley, 2004
- Heliocidaris tuberculata (Lamarck, 1816)
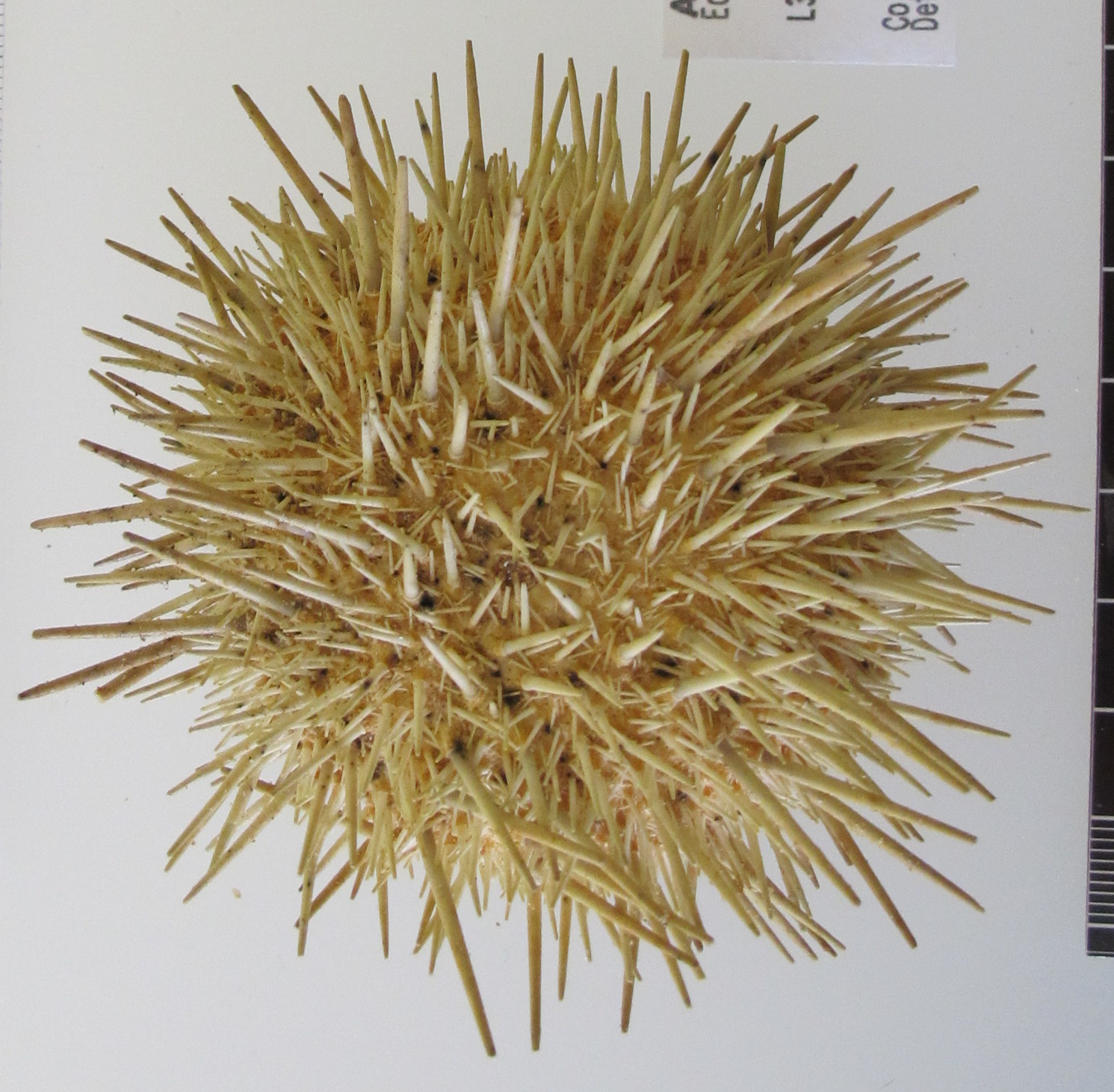
Heliocidaris australiae

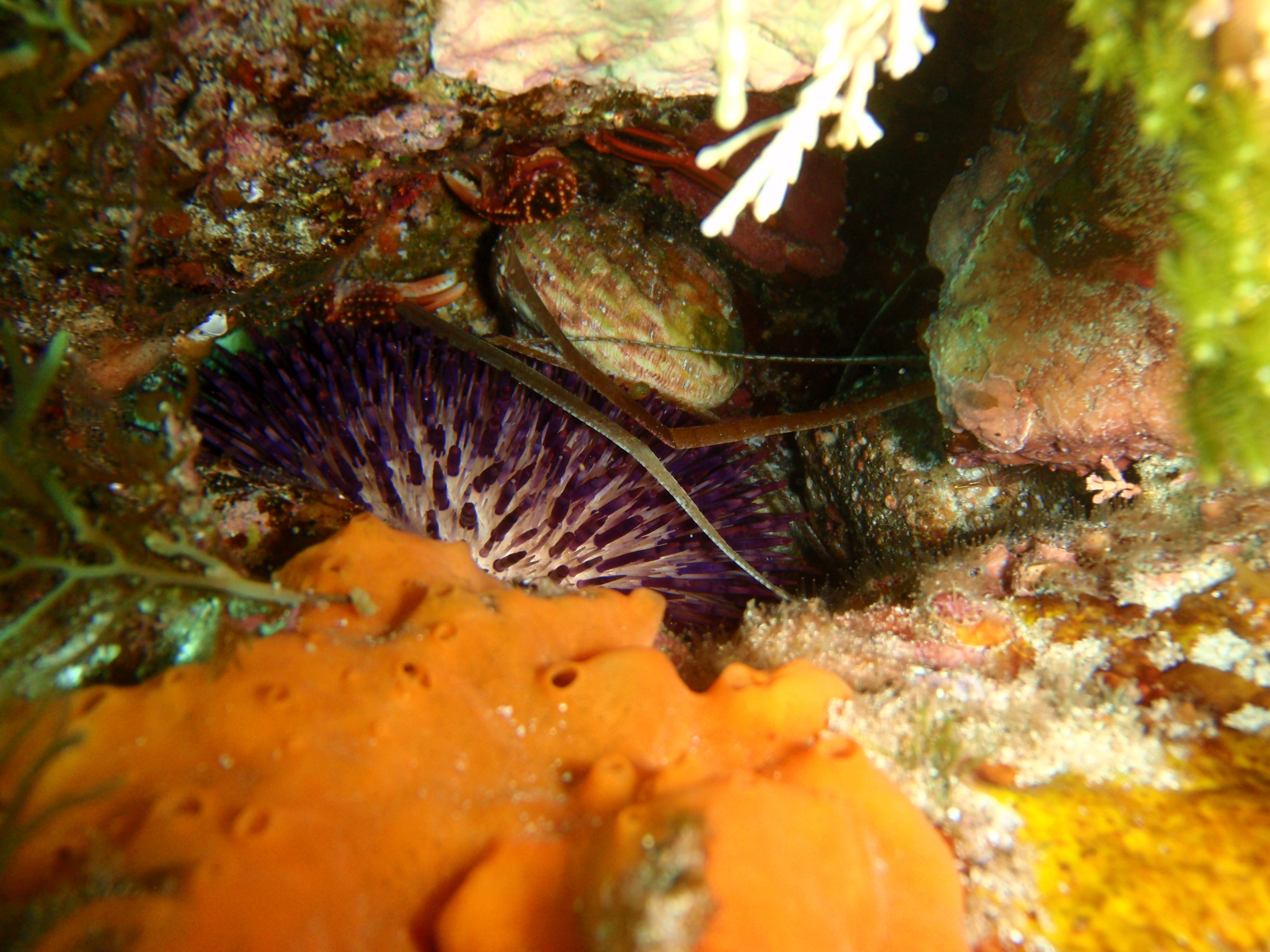
Heliocidaris erythrogramma

Heliocidaris tuberculata
