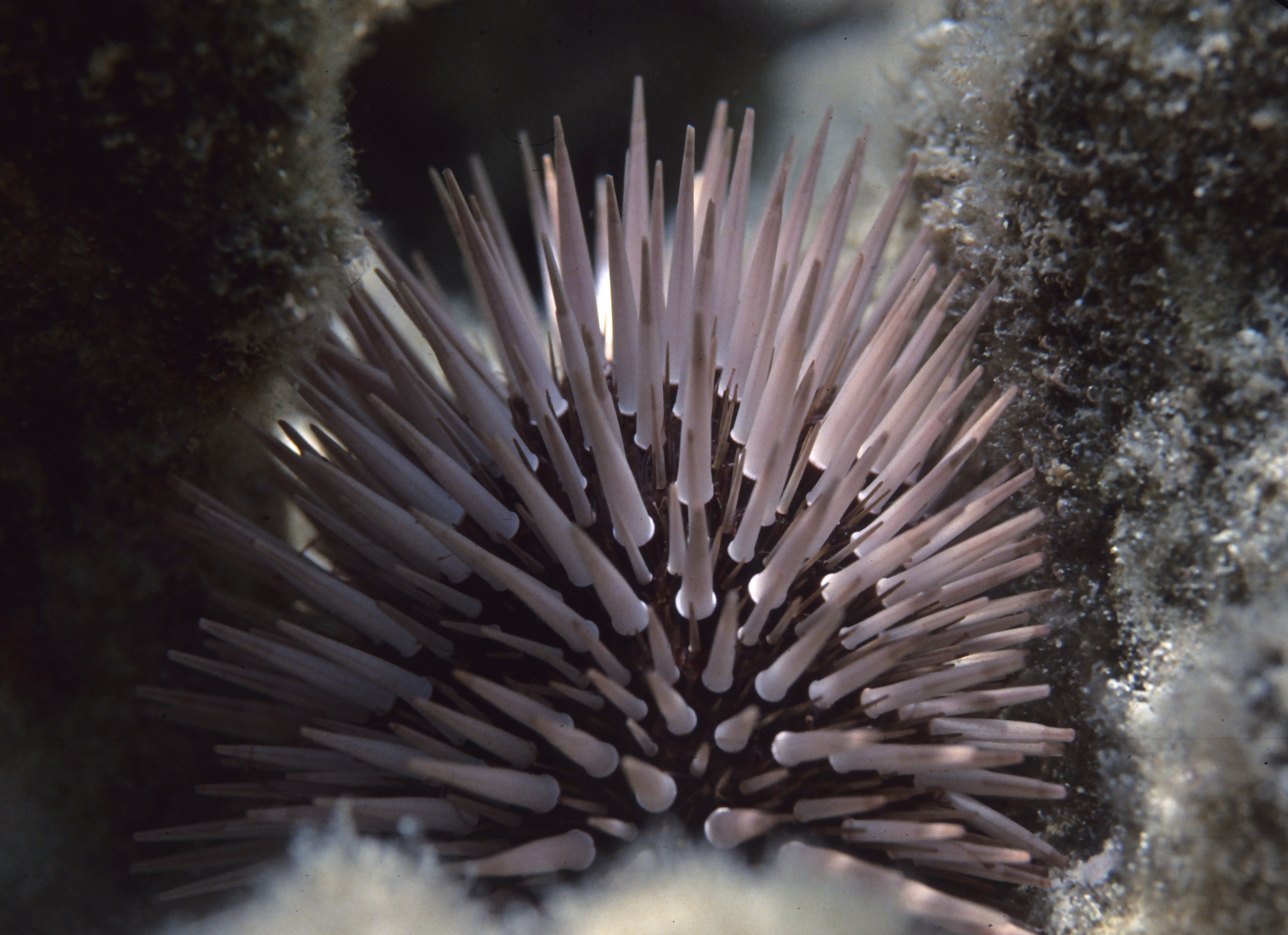
- Echinometra mathaei

Scientific classification
- Kingdom: Animalia
- Phylum: Echinodermata
- Class: Echinoidea
- Order: Camarodonta
- Family: Echinometridae
- Genus: Echinometra; Gray, 1825

Species
- See text

= Echinometra =

Genus of sea urchins

Echinometra is a genus of sea urchins in the family Echinometridae.

== Species ==
The following species are listed in the World Echinoidea Database:

Image	Scientific name	Distribution
	Echinometra insularis H.L. Clark, 1912	Easter Island.
	Echinometra lucunter (Linnaeus, 1758)	western Atlantic Ocean and the Caribbean Sea.
	Echinometra mathaei (Blainville, 1825)	Indo-Pacific region
	Echinometra oblonga (Blainville, 1825)	tropical Indo-Pacific and Southern Africa
	Echinometra vanbrunti A. Agassiz, 1863	Pacific (Mexico)
	Echinometra viridis A. Agassiz, 1863	western Atlantic Ocean and the Caribbean Sea.
