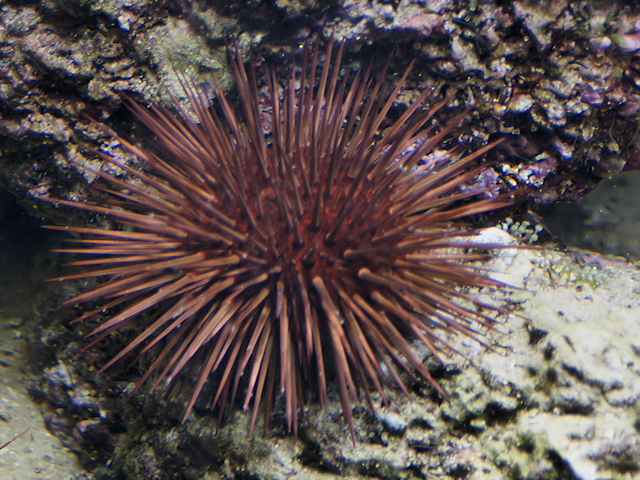
- Echinometra lucunter

Scientific classification
- Kingdom: Animalia
- Phylum: Echinodermata
- Class: Echinoidea
- Order: Camarodonta
- Family: Echinometridae
- Genus: Echinometra
- Species: E. lucunter

Binomial name
- Echinometra lucunter (Linnaeus, 1758)

Synonyms
- Cidaris fenestrata Leske, 1778; Cidaris lucunter (Linnaeus, 1758); Echinometra acufera Mellis, 1875; Echinometra lobatus (Blainville, 1825); Echinometra michelini L. Agassiz & Desor, 1846; Echinometra nigrina Girard, 1850; Echinometra subangularis A. Agassiz, 1872-74; Echinus lobatus Blainville, 1825; Echinus lucunterLinnaeus, 1758; Echinus maugei Blainville, 1825; Ellipsechinus lobatus (Blainville, 1825); Ellipsechinus lukunter (Linnaeus, 1758); Ellipsechinus subangularis (A. Agassiz, 1872-74); Heliocidaris castelnaudi Hupé, 1858; Heliocidaris mexicana L. Agassiz & Desor, 1846; Toxocidaris mexicana (L. Agassiz & Desor, 1846)

= Echinometra lucunter =

Species of sea urchin

Echinometra lucunter, the rock boring urchin, is a species of sea urchin in the family Echinometridae. It is found in very shallow parts of the western Atlantic Ocean and the Caribbean Sea.

== Description ==
Echinometra lucunter has an elliptical rather than a round test (shell). It can grow to a diameter of about 8 centimetres (3.1 in) and grows larger at the extreme north and south ends of its range than it does in the centre. It has moderately short spines with wide bases and sharp tips. The colour of the test varies from black to deep brownish-red, often being more ruddy on its aboral (upper) surface than on its oral (lower) surface. The spines are usually black.

== Distribution and habitat ==
Echinometra lucunter is common throughout the Caribbean Sea and also occurs in Florida, Bermuda and the South American coast as far south as Brazil. It occurs on shallow rocky areas and on coral reefs usually at depths of 2 metres (6 ft 7 in) or less but occasionally in deeper water down to about 45 metres (148 ft). It is sometimes found among seagrasses and often under rock slabs or broken coral especially in places with high water movement. It sometimes occurs in large numbers and causes considerable damage to coral reefs through its boring activities.

== Biology ==
Echinometra lucunter uses the teeth that surround its mouth to grind away at the rock underneath it so as to make a hemispherical depression in which it takes refuge during the day. It emerges at night to graze on algae growing within a few centimetres (inches) of its home. It defends this hole against other sea urchins of its own species. The king helmet shell (Cassis tuberosa) feeds on it and several species of small goby conceal themselves underneath its test.
