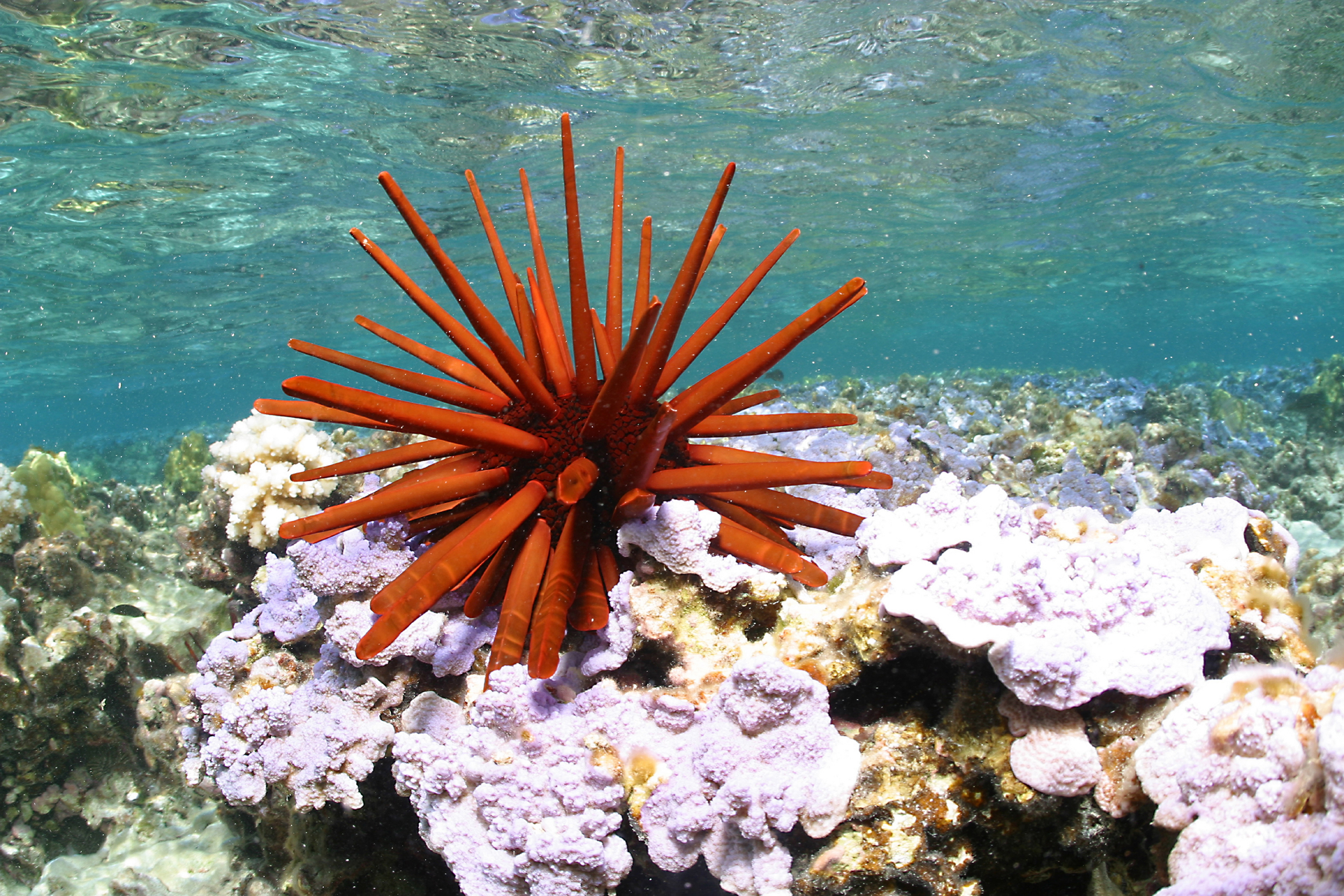
- Heterocentrotus trigonarius

Scientific classification
- Kingdom: Animalia
- Phylum: Echinodermata
- Class: Echinoidea
- Order: Camarodonta
- Infraorder: Echinidea
- Family: Echinometridae; Gray, 1855

Genera
- See text

= Echinometridae =

Family of echinoderms

The Echinometridae are a family of sea urchins in the class Echinoidea.

== Characteristics ==
All Echinometridae have imperforate tubercles and compound ambulacral plates.

== Genera ==
- Anthocidaris A. Agassiz, 1863
- Caenocentrotus H.L. Clark, 1912
- Colobocentrotus Brandt, 1835
- Echinometra Gray, 1825
- Echinostrephus A. Agassiz, 1863
- Evechinus Verrill, 1871
- Heliocidaris L. Agassiz & Desor, 1846
- Heterocentrotus Brandt, 1835
- Selenechinus de Meijere, 1904
- Zenocentrotus A.H. Clark, 1932
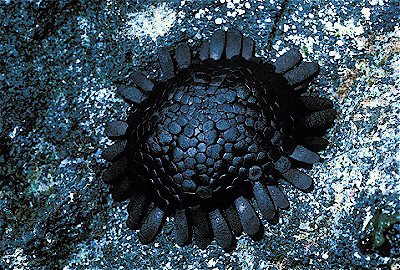
Colobocentrotus atratus

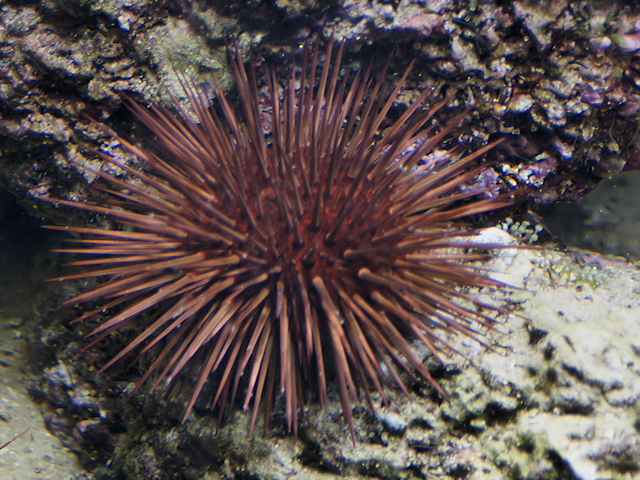
Echinometra lucunter

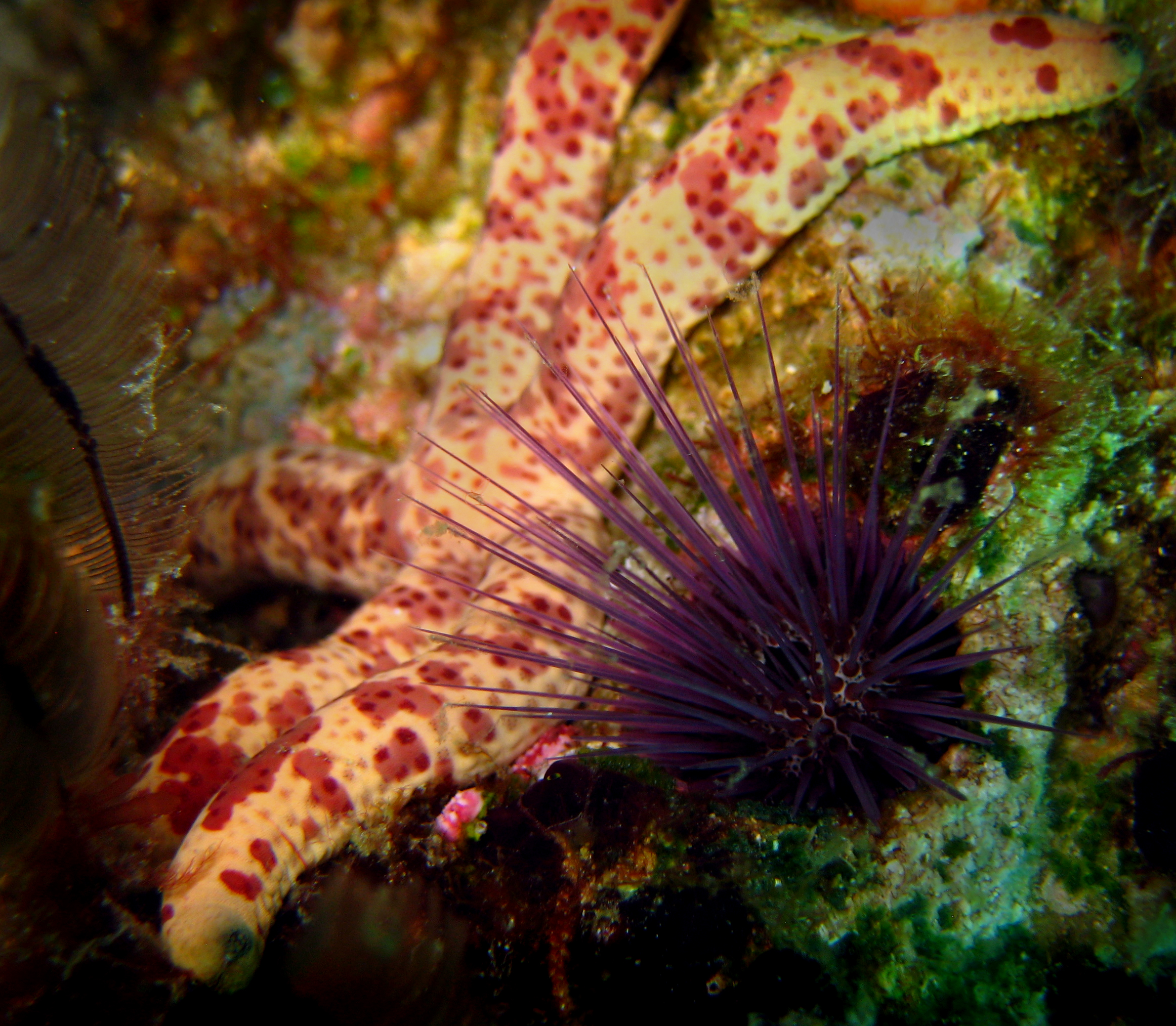
Echinostrephus molaris

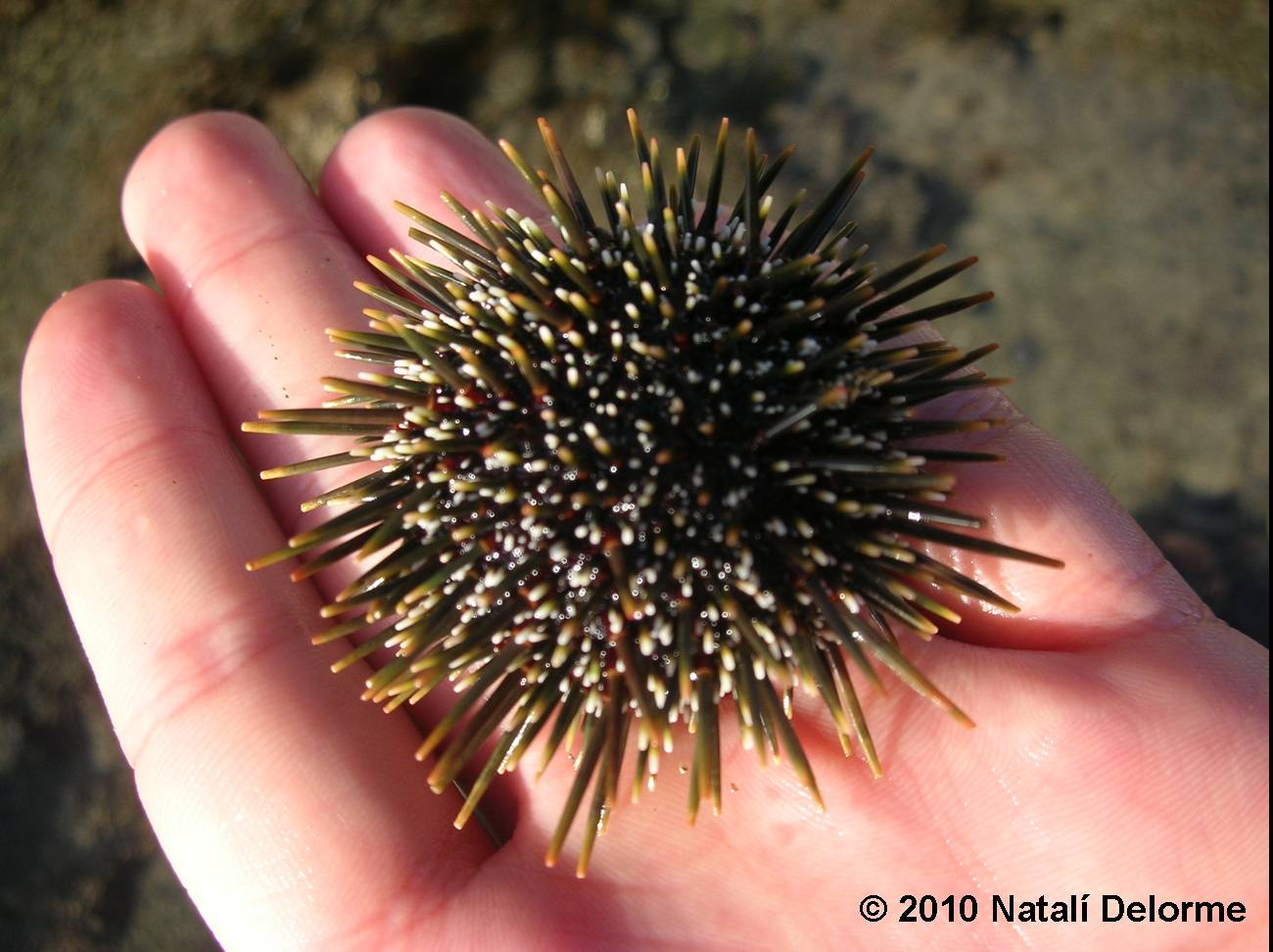
Evechinus chloroticus

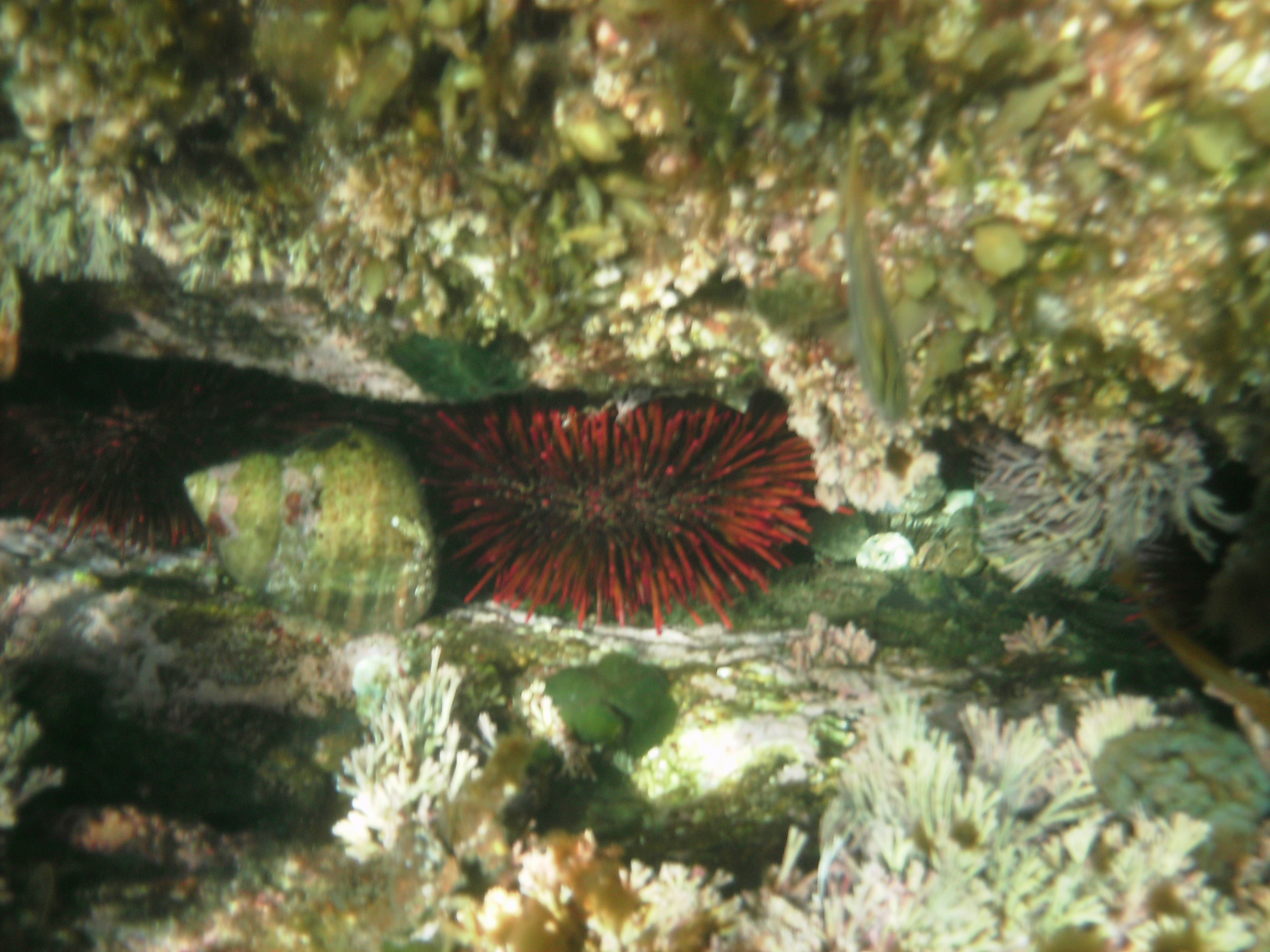
Heliocidaris tuberculata

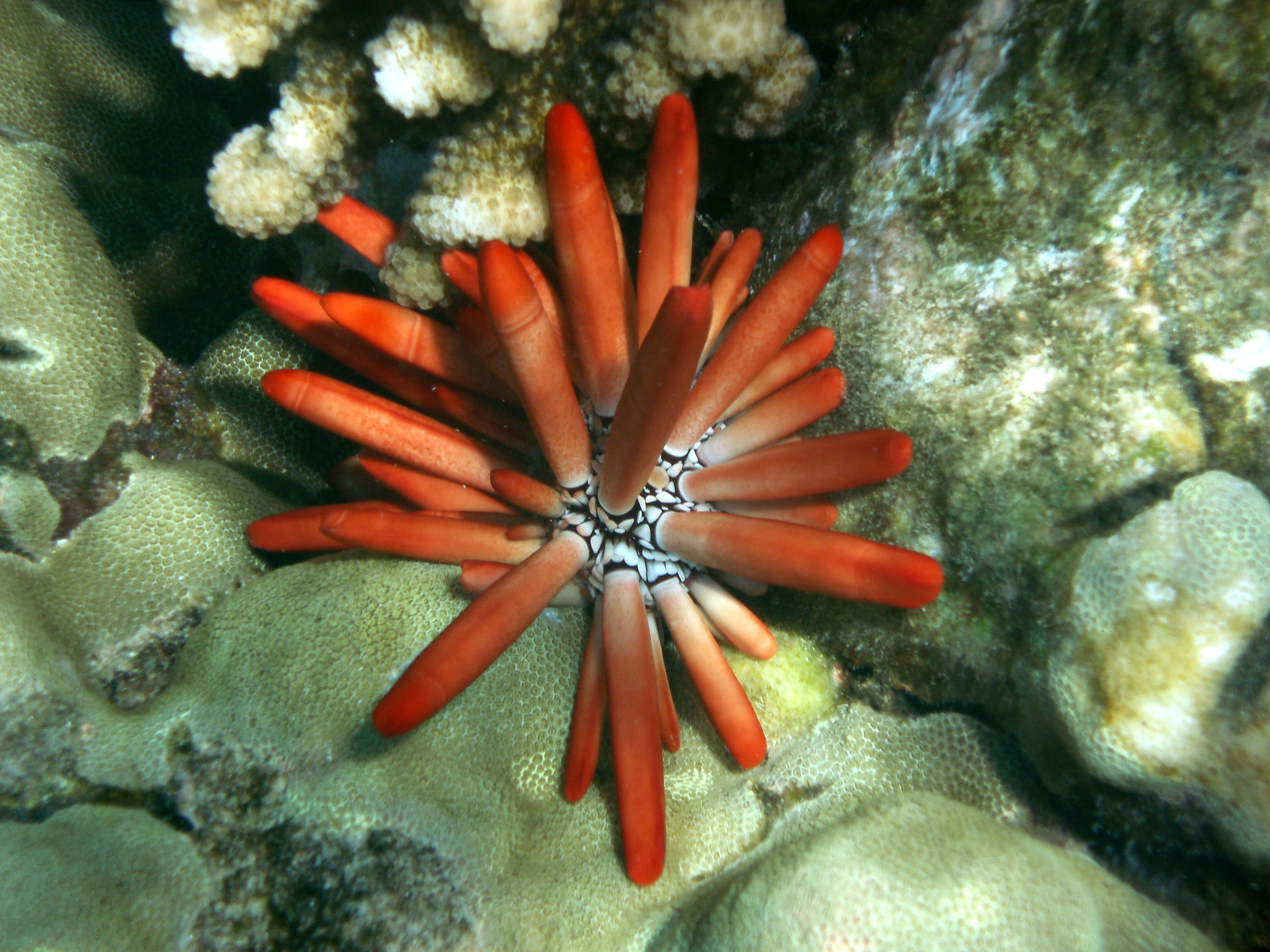
Heterocentrotus mammillatus
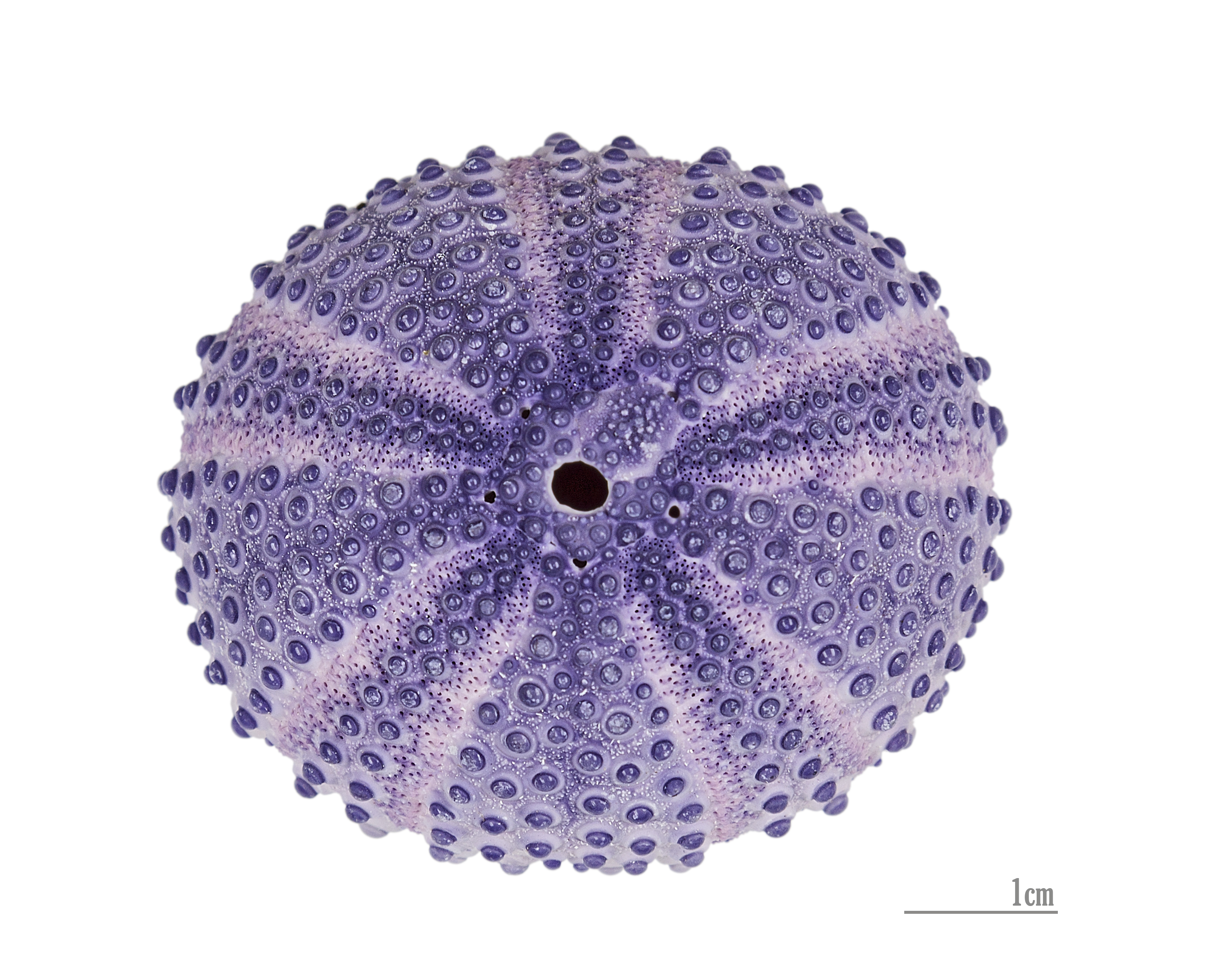
Colobocentrotus atratus dried test

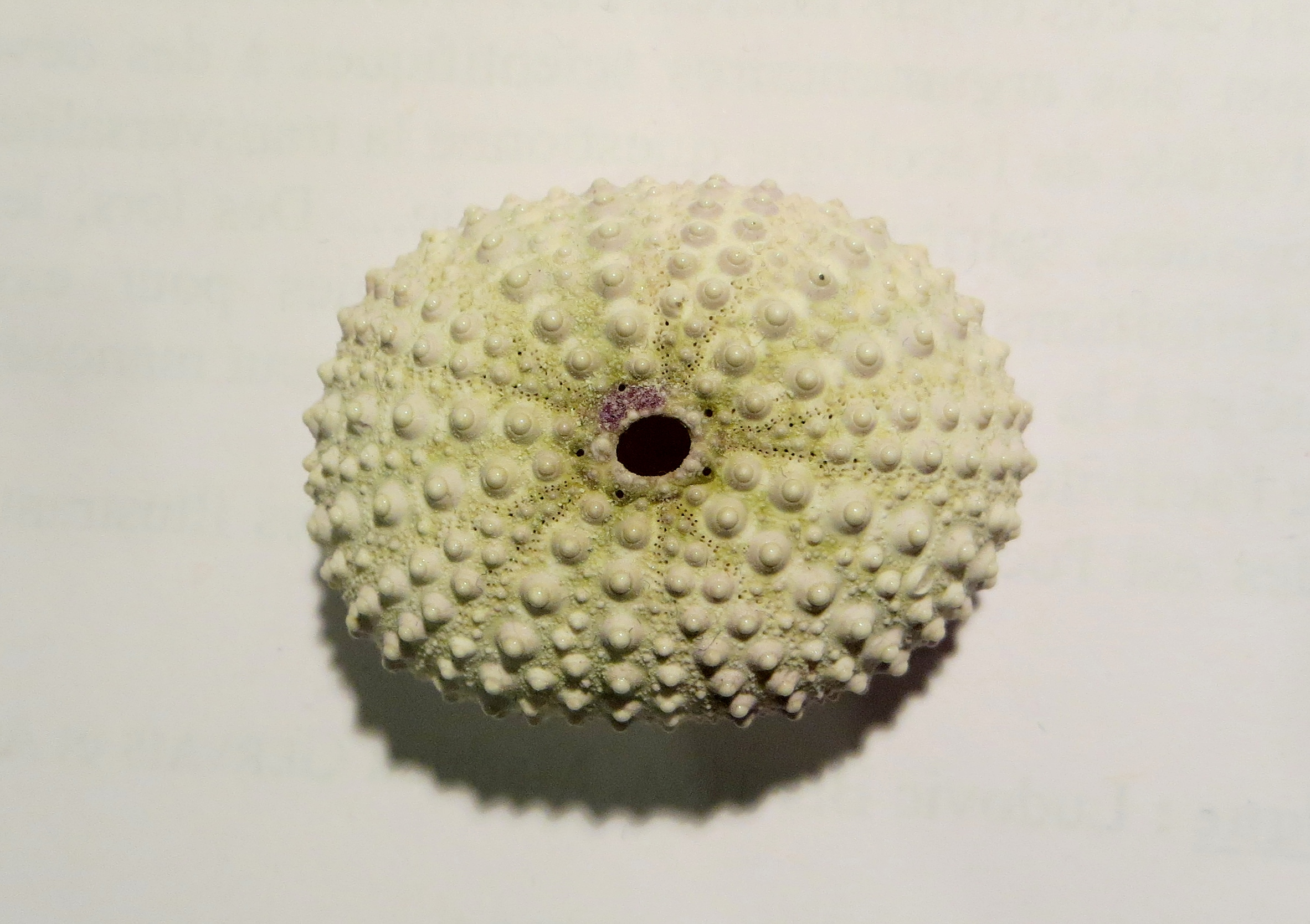
Echinometra mathaei dried test

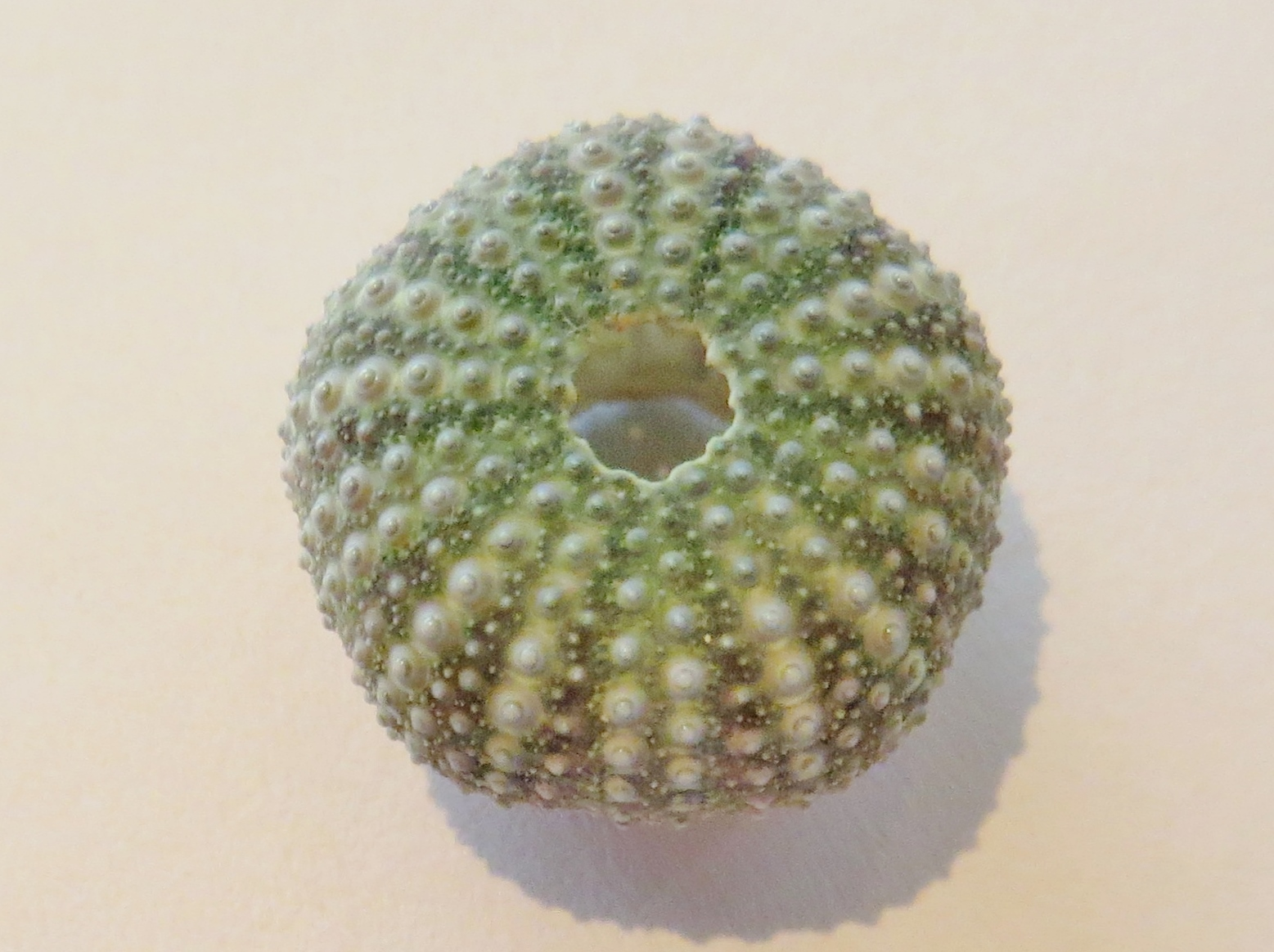
Echinostrephus molaris dried test

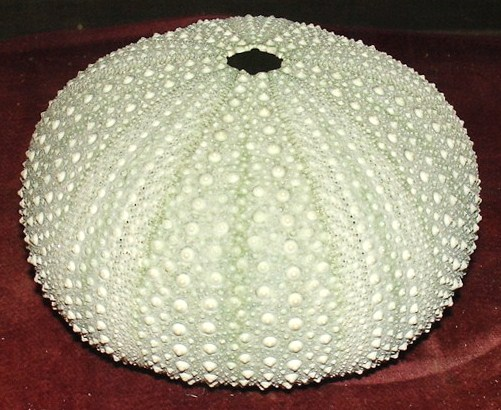
Evechinus chloroticus dried test

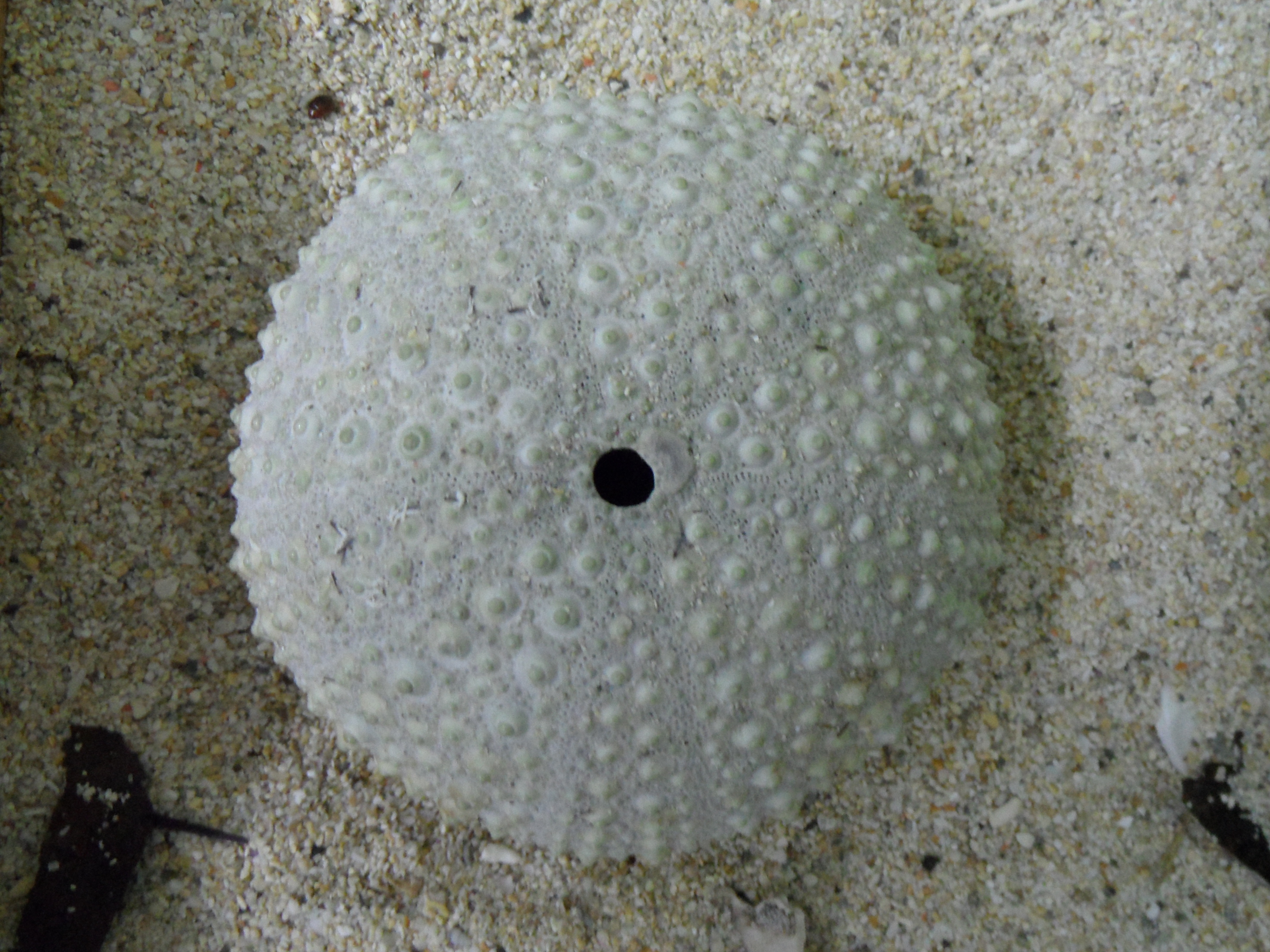
Heliocidaris tuberculata dried test

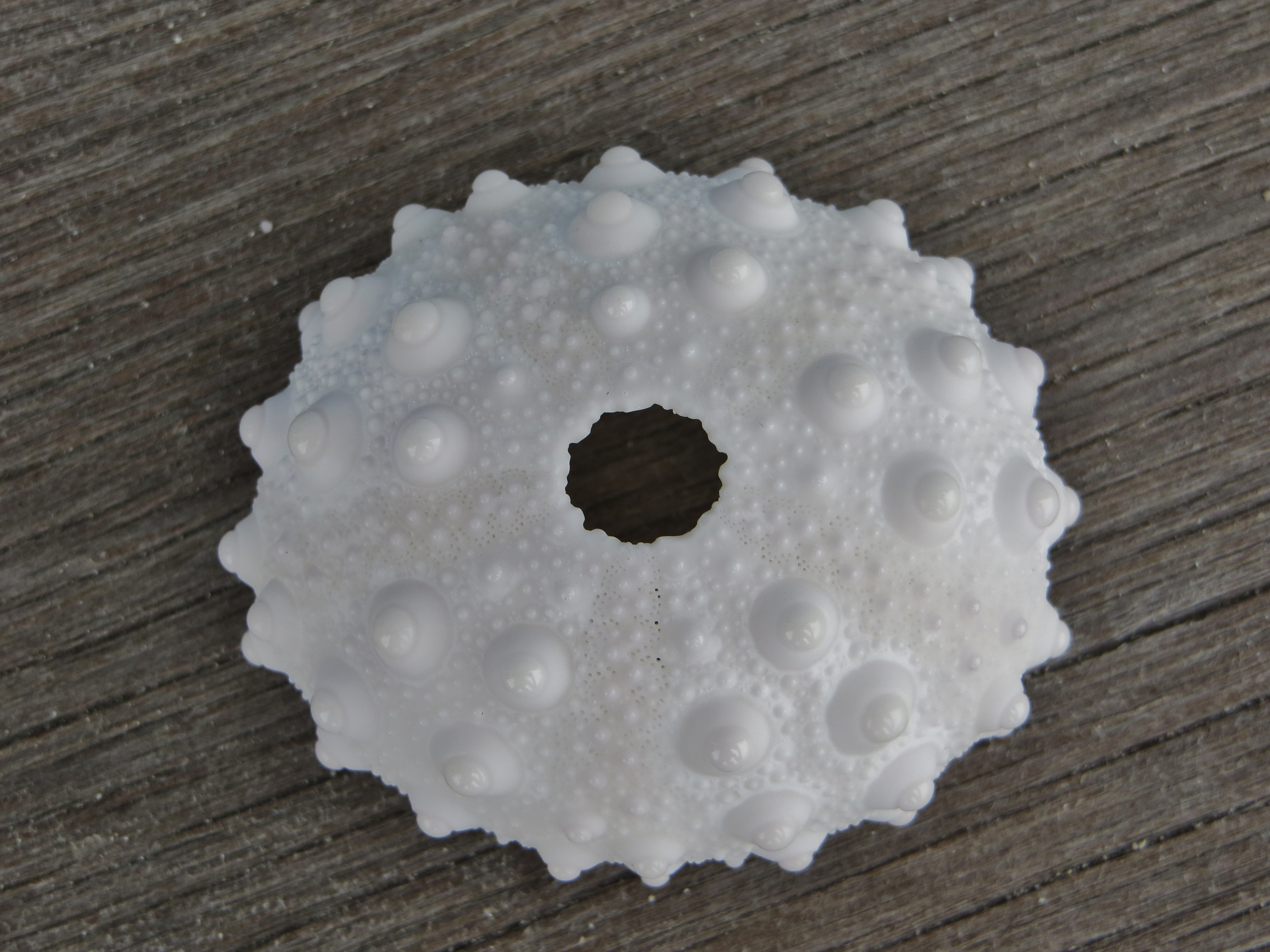
Heterocentrotus mamillatus dried test
