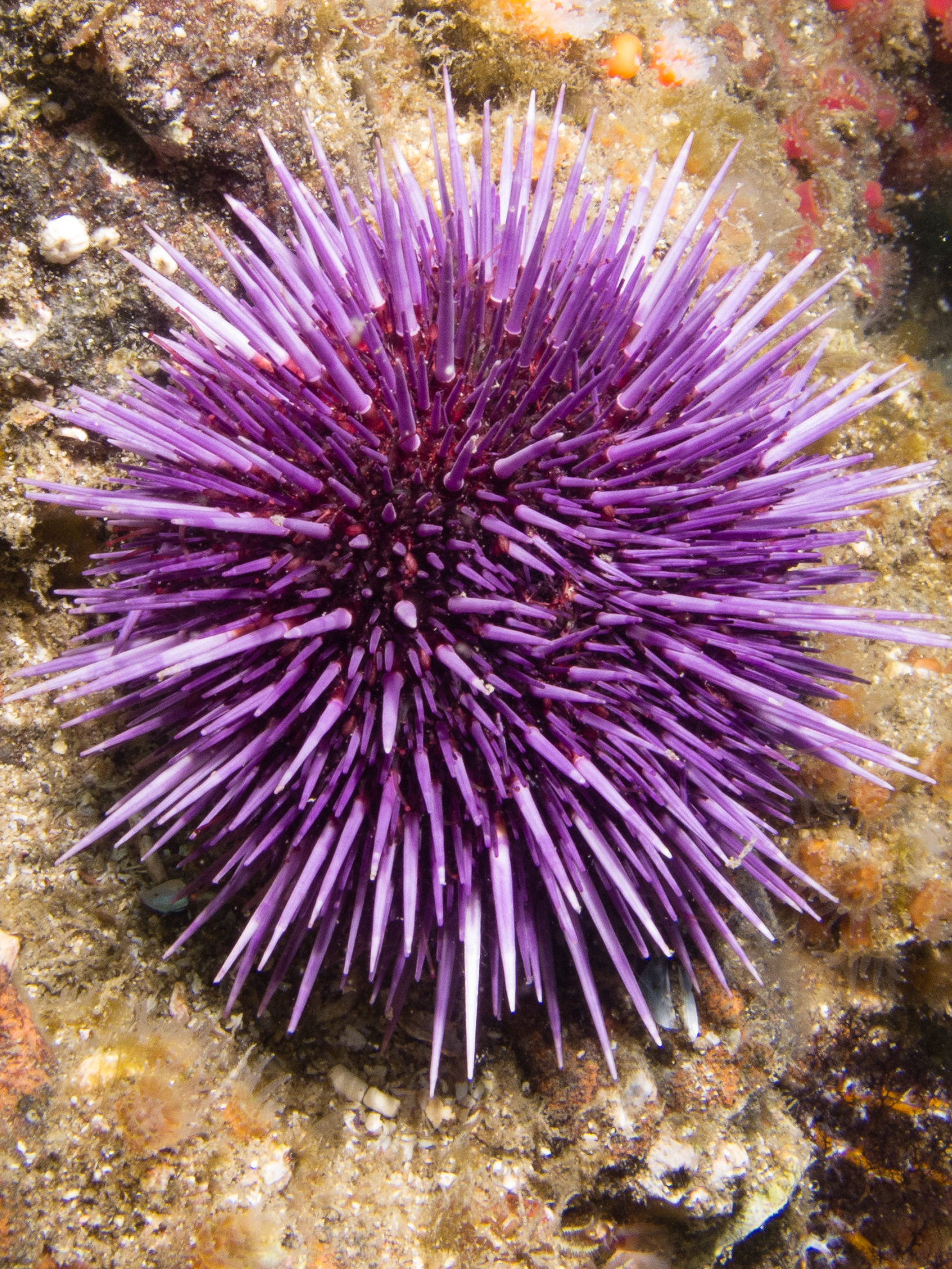

Scientific classification
- Kingdom: Animalia
- Phylum: Echinodermata
- Class: Echinoidea
- Order: Camarodonta
- Family: Strongylocentrotidae
- Genus: Strongylocentrotus
- Species: S. purpuratus

Binomial name
- Strongylocentrotus purpuratus (Stimpson, 1857)
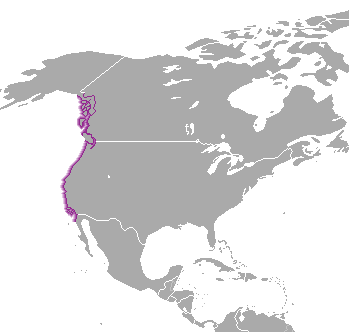
- Range of S. purpuratus

= Strongylocentrotus purpuratus =

Species of sea urchin

Strongylocentrotus purpuratus is a species of sea urchin in the family Strongylocentrotidae, which is commonly known as the purple sea urchin or Pacific purple sea urchin. It lives along the eastern edge of the Pacific Ocean extending from Ensenada, Mexico, to British Columbia, Canada.

== Description ==
As the common and specific names suggest, S. purpuratus is deep purple in color. It lives in lower intertidal and nearshore subtidal communities. It normally grows to a diameter of about 10 centimetres (3.9 in), consisting of a form of exoskeleton called a test. They may live as long as 70 years.

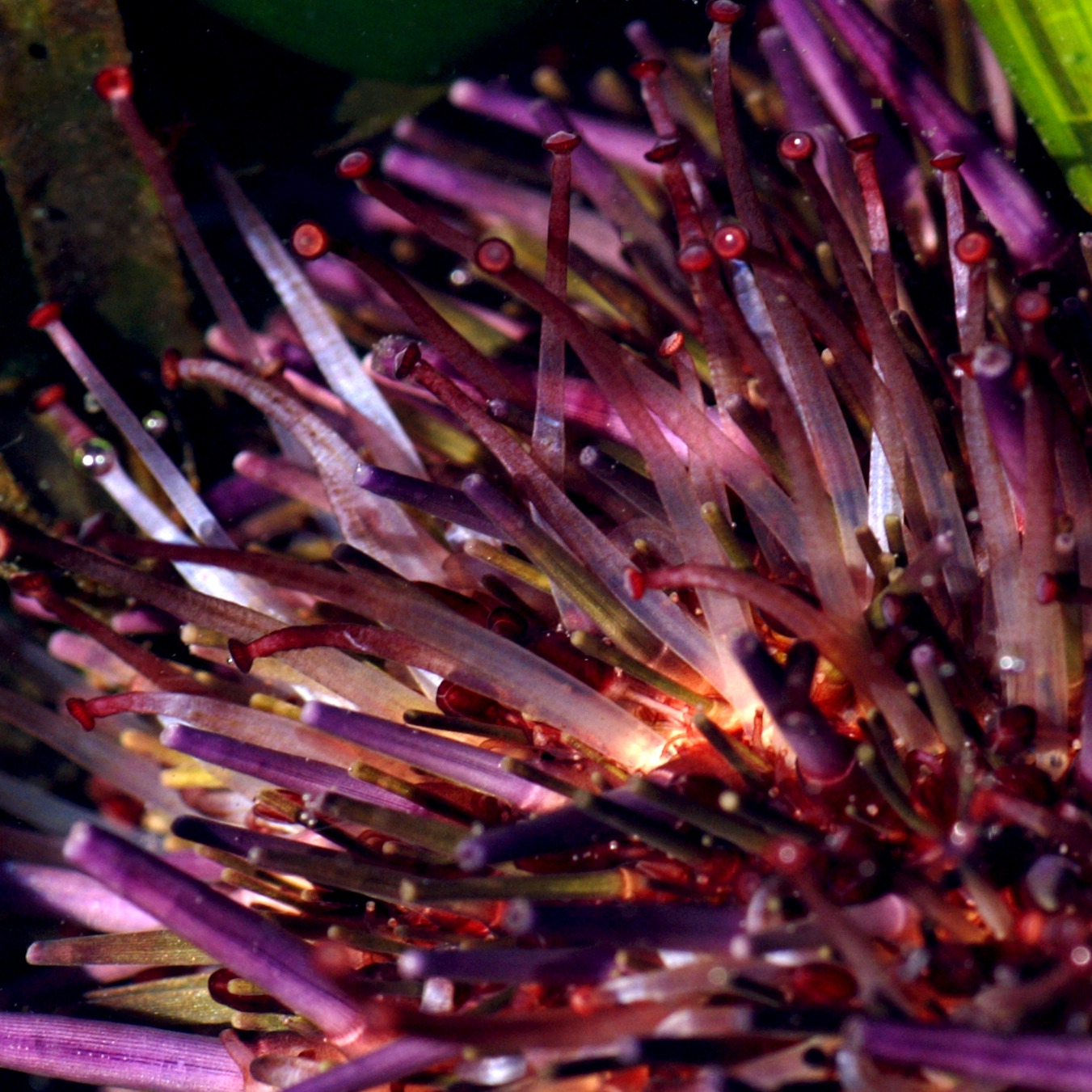
S. purpuratus moves using its tube feet

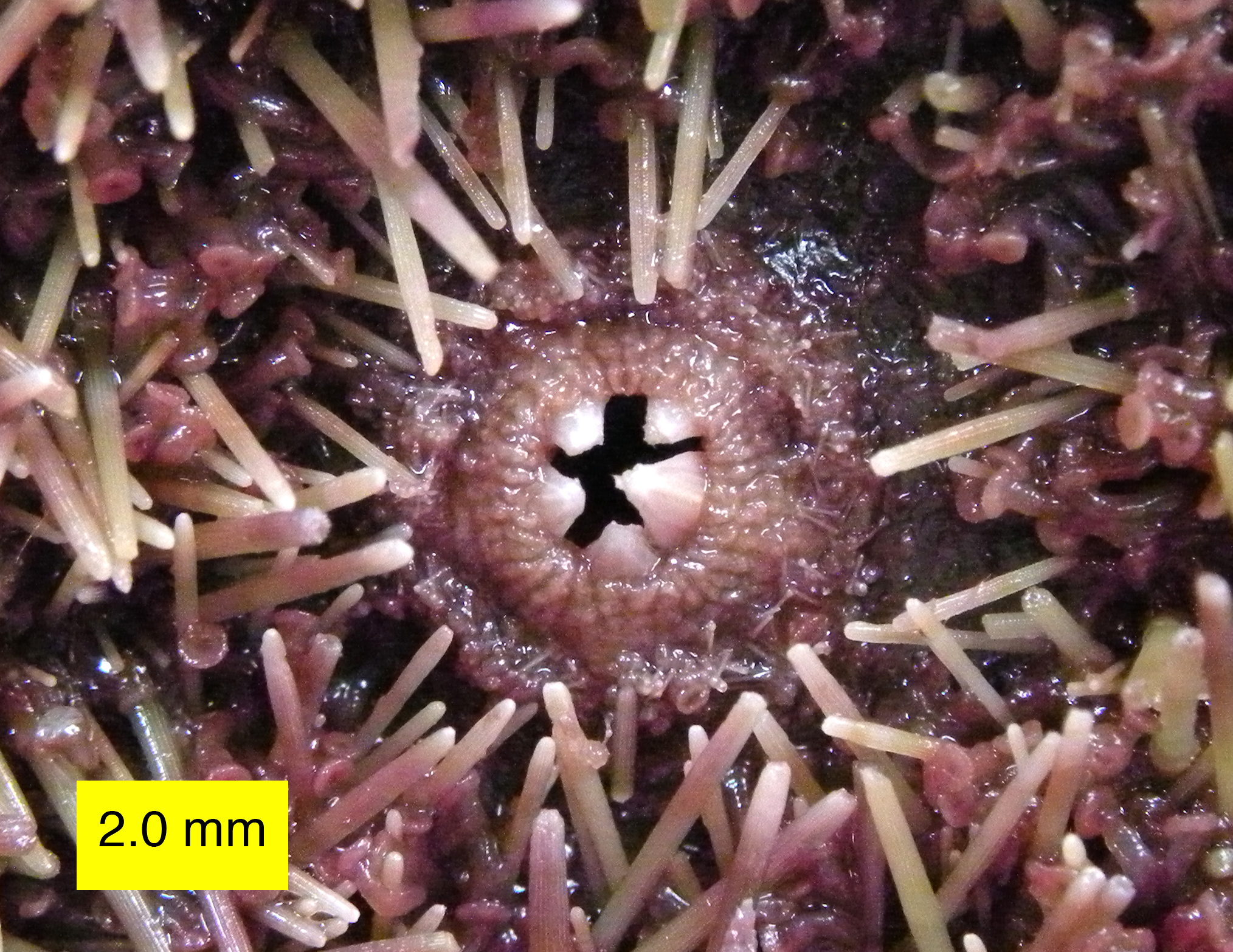
Oral surface of S. purpuratus, showing Aristotle's lantern, spines, and tube feet

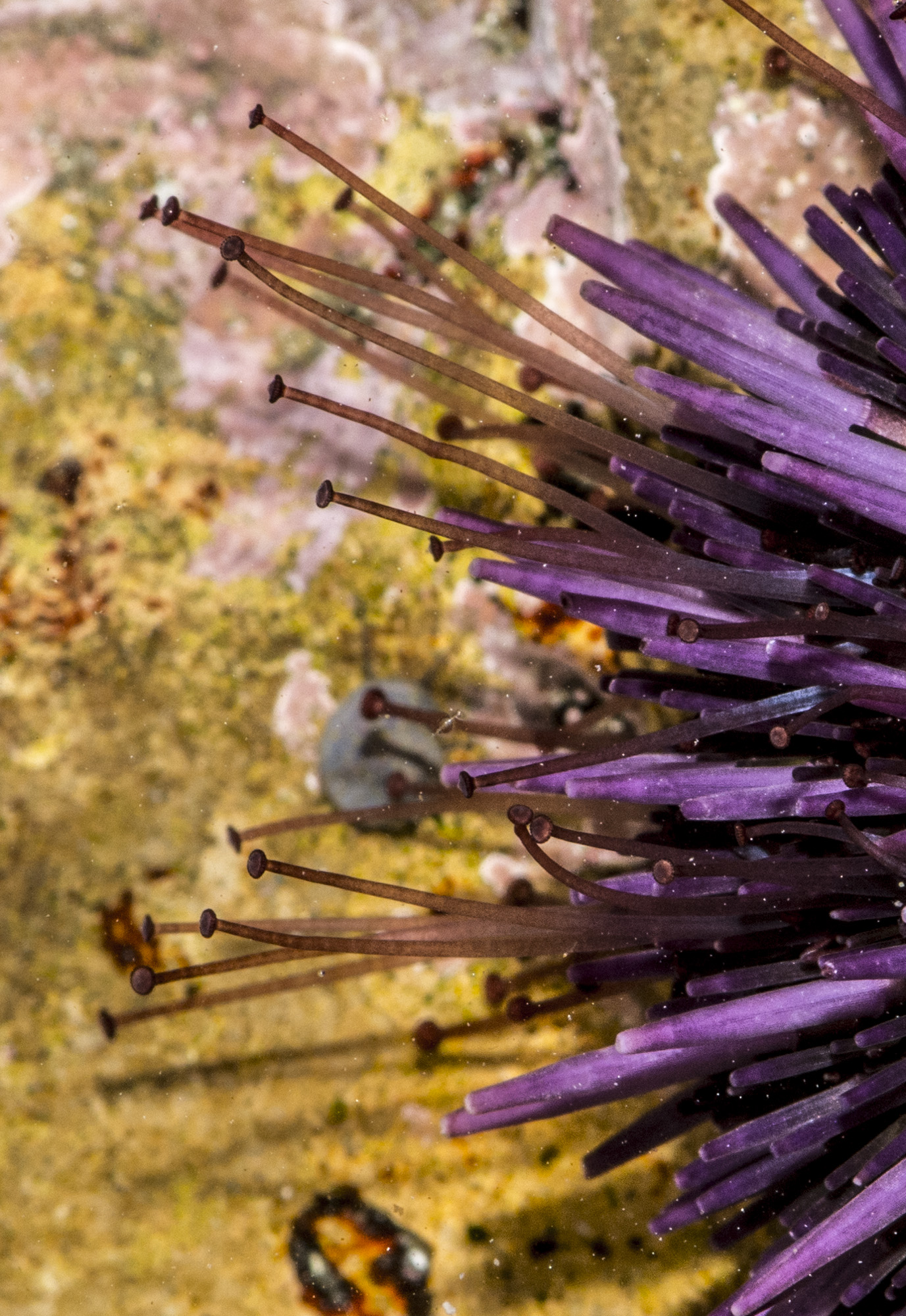
Extended tube feet and spines

Close-up of spines

== Biology ==
The purple sea urchin, along with sea otters and abalones, is a prominent member of the kelp forest community. The purple sea urchin also plays a key role in the disappearance of kelp forests that is currently occurring due to climate change; when urchins completely eliminate kelp from an area, it results in an urchin barren. The purple sea urchin cohabits with the red urchin and the two species exhibit niche partitioning.

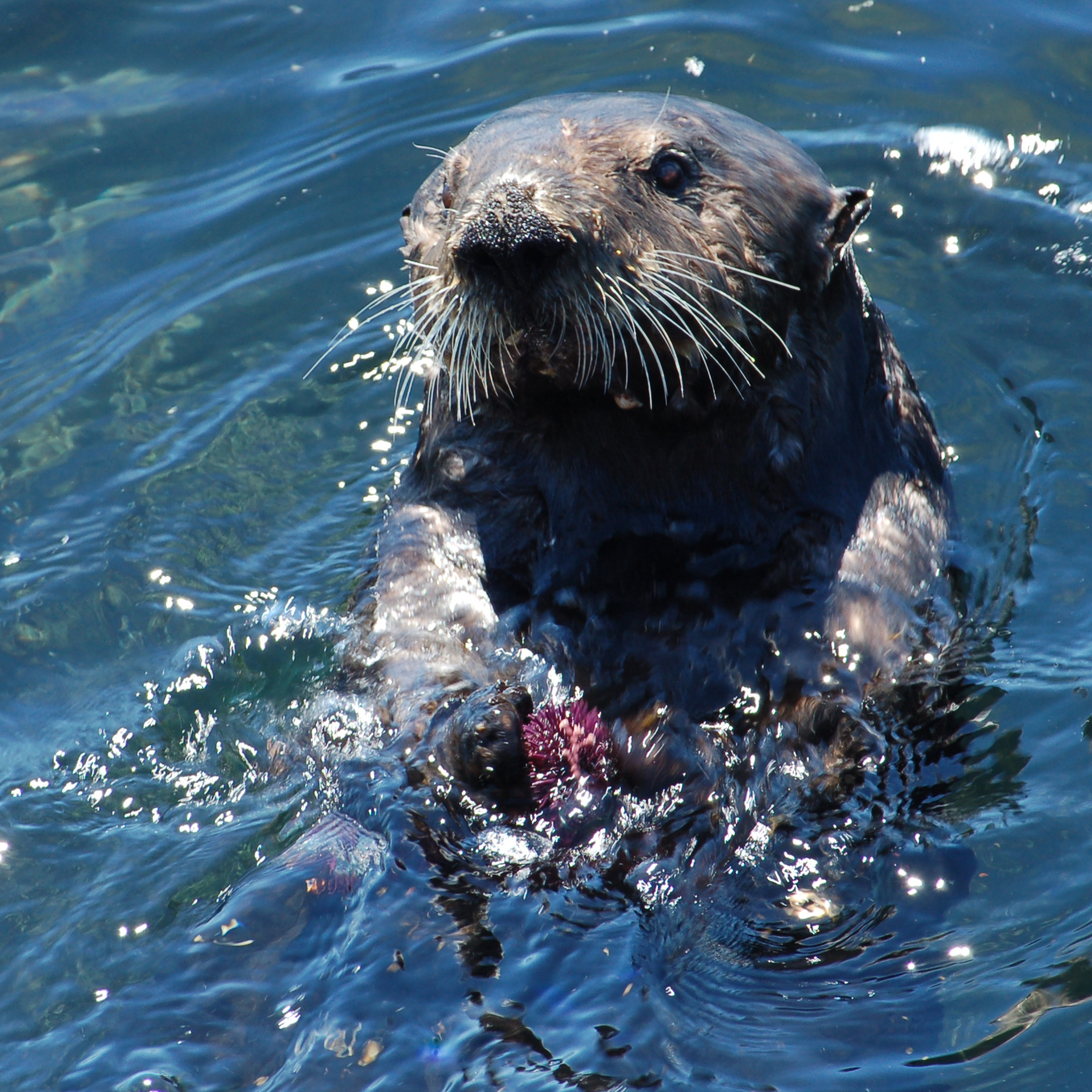
A sea otter feeding on a S. purpuratus

The primary predator of S. purpuratus, the Sunflower sea star has become critically endangered due to sea star wasting disease, and another predator, the sea otter, has also experienced a population decline. This has led to a population boom of the purple sea urchin and in turn created an environmental crisis (urchin-kelp crisis) in waters surrounding California and Oregon since 2013.

The rising population of purple sea urchins has consumed swathes of local bull kelp forest. Efforts were undertaken by volunteer recreational divers to cull the purple sea urchin by smashing them with hammers starting in 2018. However, local laws have prevented from the efforts to continue as the purple sea urchin is a native species and not yet considered an invasive one. A local company has also tried to farm the urchins to increase the amount of gonads inside, in the hopes of creating a commercial demand.

=== Reproduction ===
Male S. purpuratus releasing sperm during experimental spawning in lab

Sexual maturity in purple urchins is reached around two years. Purple urchins are broadcast spawners, with females releasing orange eggs and males releasing white sperm into the water column, where fertilization occurs. January, February, and March function as the typical active reproductive months for the species.

== Relation to humans ==
Sea urchins like the purple sea urchin have been used for food by the indigenous peoples of California, who ate the yellow egg mass (roe) raw. In California, the peak gonad growth season (and therefore peak of edibility) is September–October. Early in the season, the gonads are still growing and the yield will be smaller. From November onwards the gonads are developed, however harvesting stress can induce spawning, decreasing quality.

=== Research ===
S. purpuratus is also used as a model organism and its genome was the first echinoderm genome to be sequenced.

==== Genome sequencing ====
The genome of the purple sea urchin was completely sequenced and annotated in 2006 by teams of scientists from over 70 institutions including the Kerckhoff Marine Laboratory at the California Institute of Technology as well as the Human Genome Sequencing Center at the Baylor College of Medicine. A new improved version of the purple sea urchin genome, Strongylocentrotus purpuratus v5.0, is now available on Echinobase. S. purpuratus is one of several biomedical research model organisms in cell and developmental biology. The sea urchin is the first animal with a sequenced genome that:

1. is a free-living, motile marine invertebrate,
2. has a bilaterally organized embryo but a radial adult body plan,
3. has the endoskeleton and water vascular system found only in echinoderms, and
4. has a nonadaptive immune system that is unique in the enormous complexity of its receptor repertoire.

The sea urchin genome is estimated to encode about 23,500 genes. The S. purpuratus has 353 protein kinases, containing members of 97% of human kinase subfamilies. Many of these genes were previously thought to be vertebrate innovations or were only known from groups outside the deuterostomes (the larger group to which both echinoderms and humans belong). The team sequencing the species concluded that some genes are not vertebrate specific as thought previously, while other genes still were found in the urchin but not the chordate. Sea urchins are also the closest living relative to chordates. Many of the genes of the sea urchin are involved in sensing the environment, a fact surprising for an animal lacking a head structure. The sea urchin also has a chemical defensome that reacts when stress is sensed to eliminate potentially toxic chemicals. Three distinct eukaryotic DNA-dependent RNA polymerases were found within the model organism S. purpuratus.

The research also found that increasing carbon dioxide concentrations affect the epigenome, gene expression, and phenotype of the purple sea urchin. Carbon dioxide concentration also reduces the size of its larvae, which indicates that fitness of the larvae could be negatively impacted.

=== Potential therapeutic uses ===
Using the strictest measure, the purple sea urchin and humans share 7,700 genes. Many orthologs exist for genes associated with human diseases, such as Reelin (from Norman-Roberts lissencephaly syndrome) and many cytoskeletal proteins of the Usher syndrome network like usherin and VLGR1.

Alongside the investigation of embryonic development, orthologs to human diseases have led scientists to investigate potential therapeutic uses for sequences found in S. purpuratus. In 2012, scientists at the University of St Andrews began investigating the "2A" viral region in the S. purpuratus genome which may be useful for Alzheimer's disease and cancer research. The study identified a sequence that can return cells to a 'stem-cell' like state. This trait has made the species a candidate in longevity studies, particularly because of its ability to regenerate damaged or aging tissue, which was found to be upheld in older specimens as they suffered no significant disadvantages compared to younger ones.

== Gallery ==
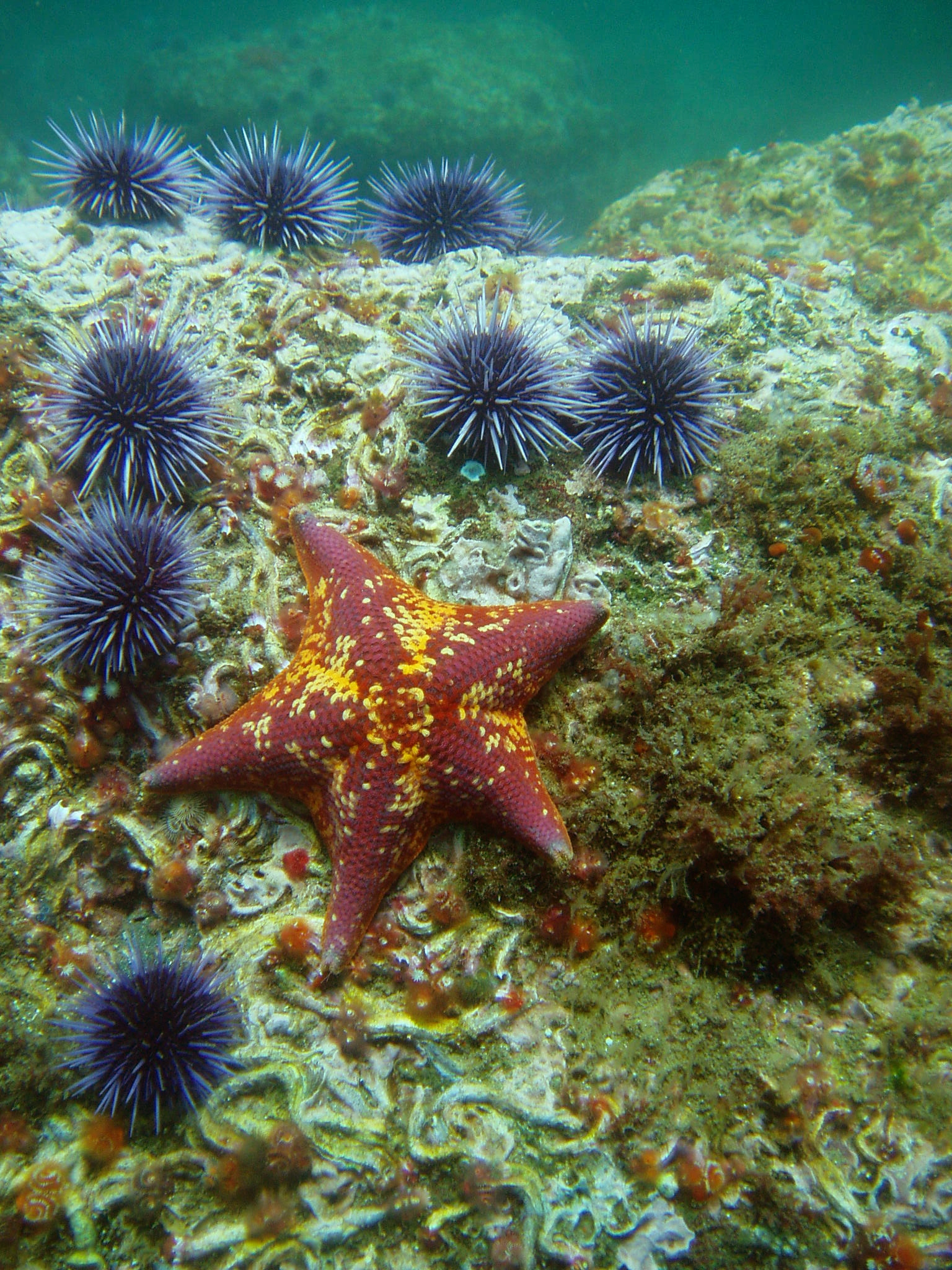
Various S. purpuratus and a Bat star (Patiria miniata)

At Tongue Point, Washington

With a Leather star (Dermasterias imbricata)

In a tide pool

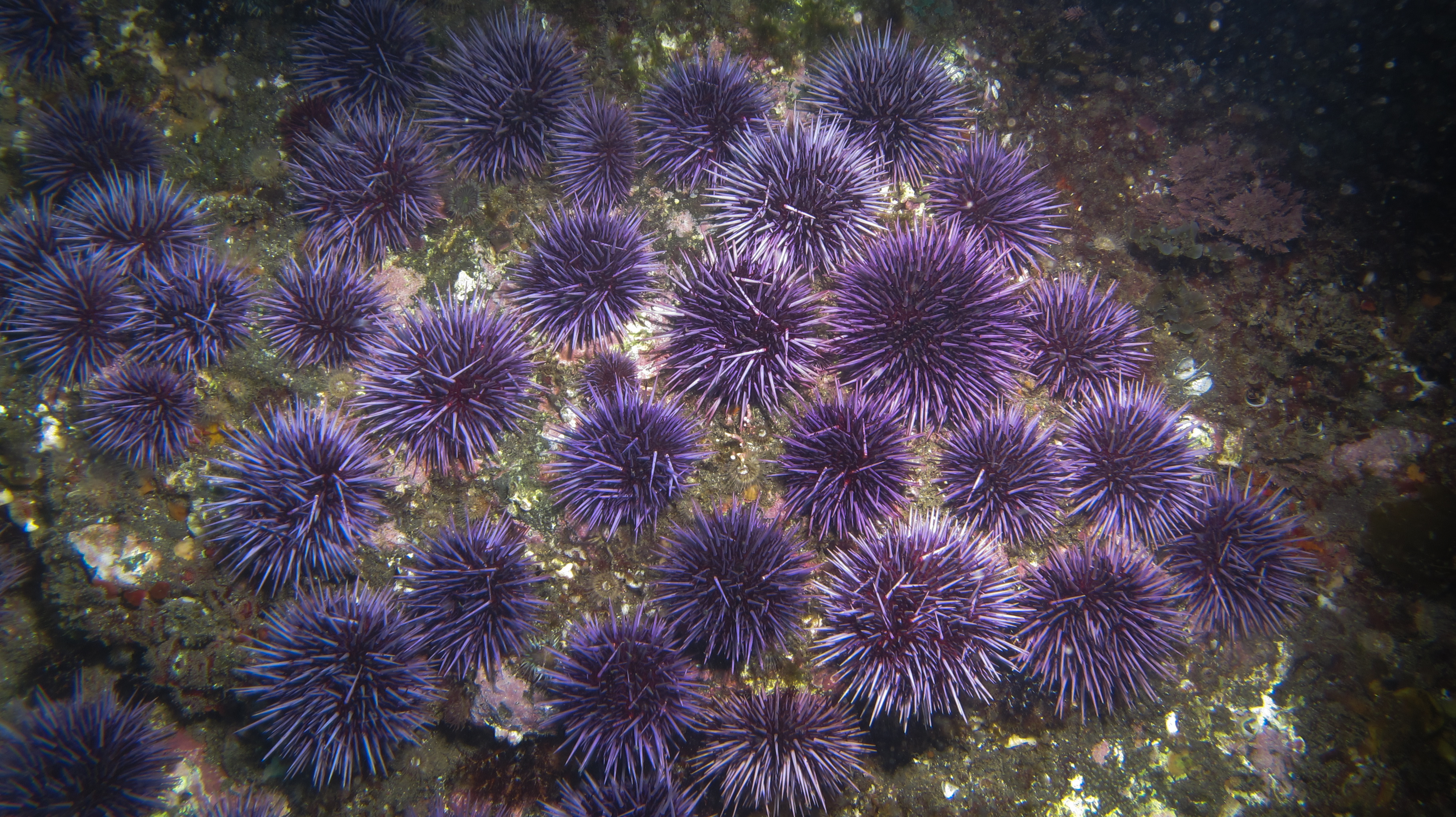
In Ventura, California

With a Purple seastar (Pisaster ochraceus)

== See also ==
- Arbacia punctulata, the Atlantic purple sea urchin
