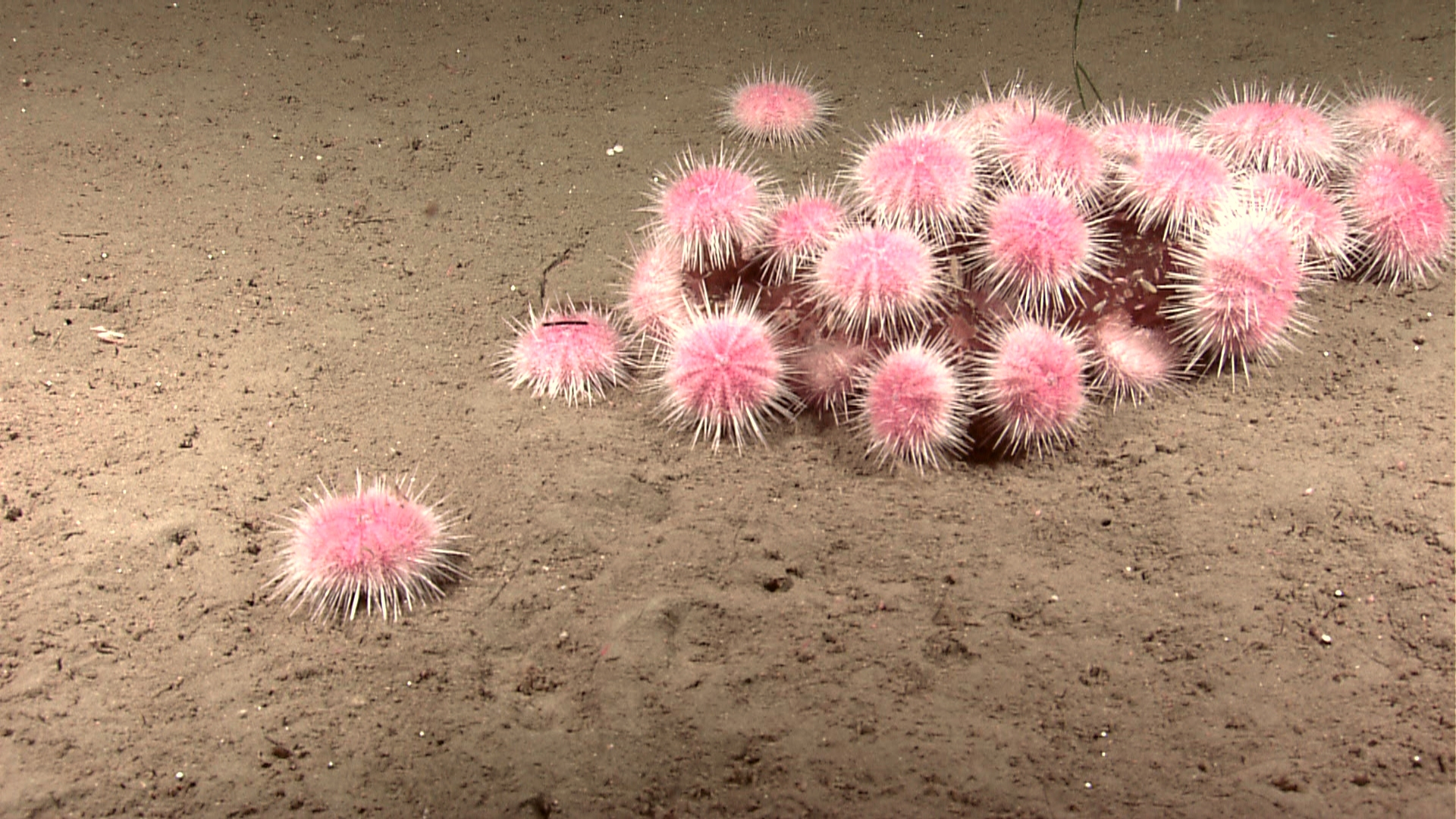

Conservation status
- Secure (NatureServe)

Scientific classification
- Kingdom: Animalia
- Phylum: Echinodermata
- Class: Echinoidea
- Order: Camarodonta
- Family: Strongylocentrotidae
- Genus: Strongylocentrotus
- Species: S. fragilis

Binomial name
- Strongylocentrotus fragilis Jackson, 1912

Synonyms
- Allocentrotus fragilis (Jackson, 1912); Toxocidaris fragilis (Jackson, 1912)

= Strongylocentrotus fragilis =

Species of sea urchin

Strongylocentrotus fragilis is a species of sea urchin of the family Strongylocentrotidae.

== Description and characteristics ==
This is a typical sea urchin, with a spherical test bearing the anus on the top and mouth on the bottom. They are somewhat flattened, and of pale pinkish color with white spines.

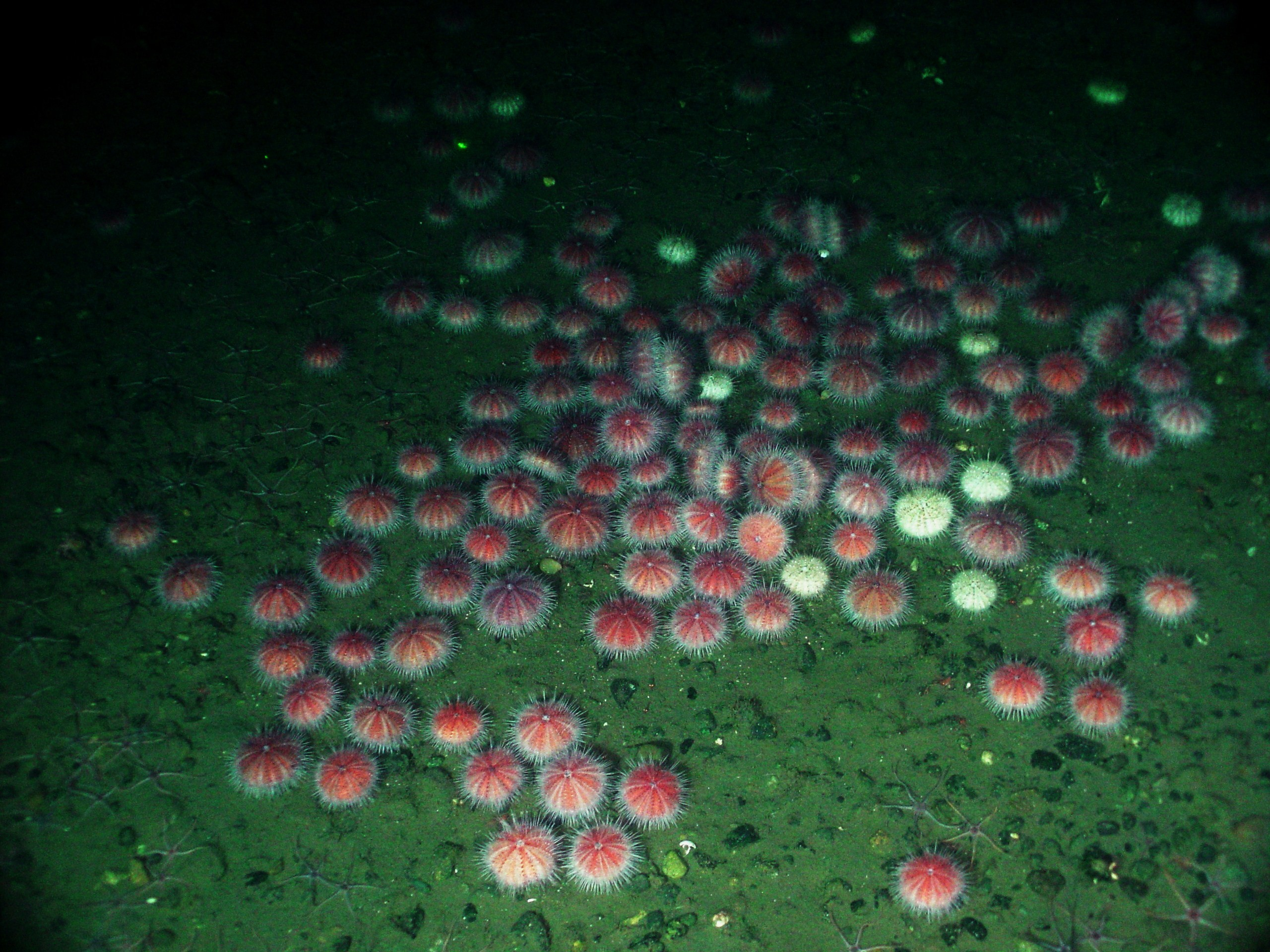
Strongylocentrotus fragilis (pink) with some Strongylocentrotus pallidus (white).

== Habitat and range ==
This is an abyssal species, occurring at many hundred meters depth on the western coastline of North America. They are distributed throughout the continental shelf and slope, being most abundant in the 200–300 m (660–980 ft) depth range.
