= Genocidaris =

Scientific classification
- Kingdom: Animalia
- Phylum: Echinodermata
- Class: Echinoidea
- Order: Camarodonta
- Family: Trigonocidaridae
- Genus: Genocidaris; A. Agassiz, 1869

Genus of echinoderms

Genocidaris is a genus of echinoderms native worldwide.

== Species ==
The follow two species are recognized in this genus:

- Genocidaris incerta H.L. Clark, 1928
- Genocidaris maculata A. Agassiz, 1869
