= Genocidaris maculata =

Scientific classification
- Kingdom: Animalia
- Phylum: Echinodermata
- Class: Echinoidea
- Order: Camarodonta
- Family: Trigonocidaridae
- Genus: Genocidaris
- Species: G. maculata

Binomial name
- Genocidaris maculata A. Agassiz, 1869

Species of urchin

Genocidaris maculata is a species of sea urchin in the genus Genocidaris.
