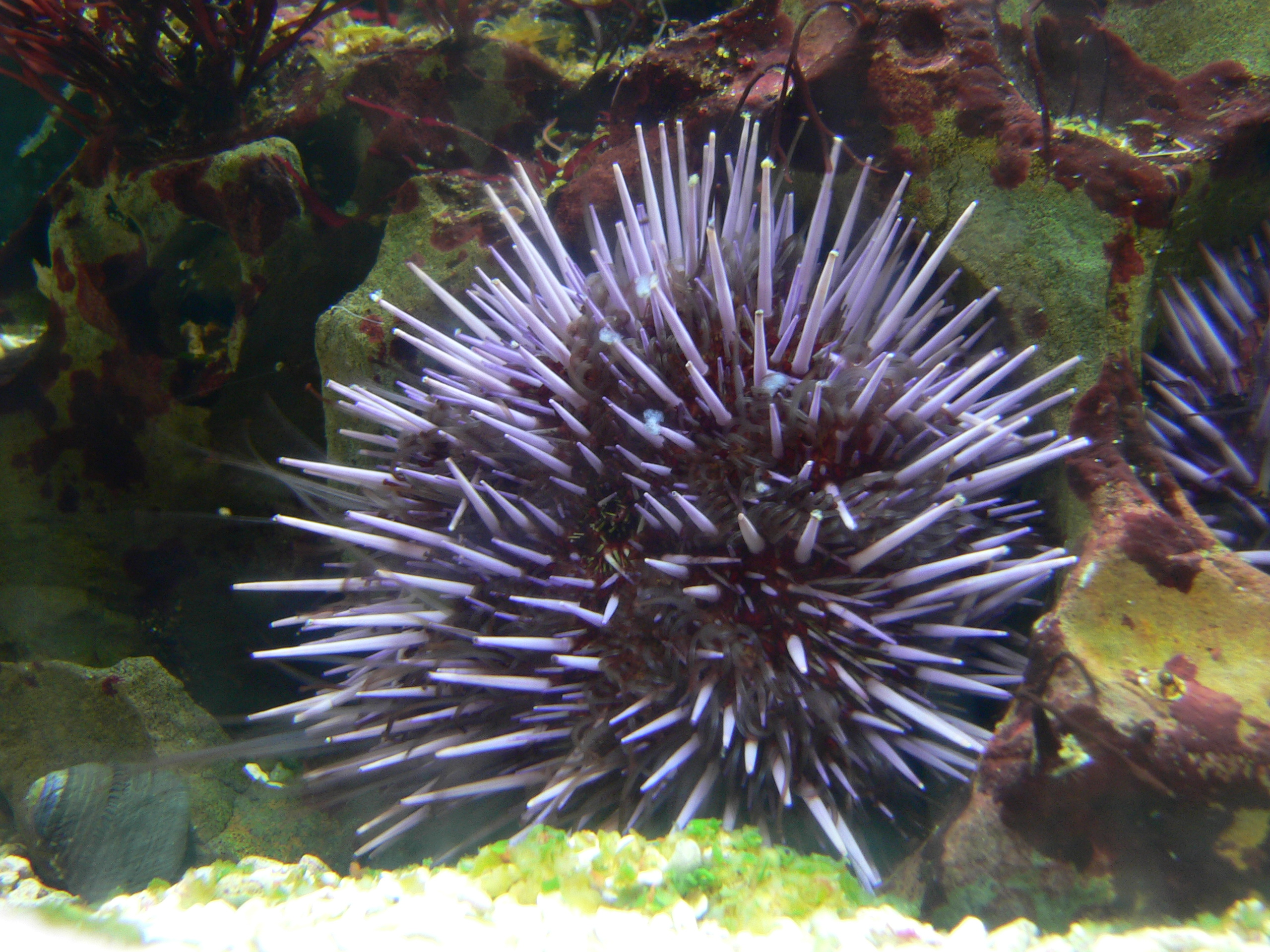
- Strongylocentrotus purpuratus

Scientific classification
- Kingdom: Animalia
- Phylum: Echinodermata
- Class: Echinoidea
- Order: Camarodonta
- Family: Strongylocentrotidae
- Genus: Strongylocentrotus; Brandt, 1835

= Strongylocentrotus =

Genus of sea urchins

Strongylocentrotus is a genus of sea urchins in the family Strongylocentrotidae containing several species.

== Species ==
The World Register of Marine Species includes:

Image	Scientific name	Common name	Distribution
	Strongylocentrotus djakonovi Baranova, 1957		Bering Sea
	Strongylocentrotus droebachiensis (Müller, 1776)	green sea urchin	the Pacific and Atlantic Oceans to a northerly latitude of 81 degrees and as far south as the Puget Sound (Washington State) and England
	Strongylocentrotus fragilis Jackson, 1912		
	Strongylocentrotus intermedius (Agassiz, 1863)		Sea of Japan, Pacific Ocean
	Strongylocentrotus pallidus (Sars, 1871)		Norway, off Russia from the Barents Sea down to the central part of the Sea of Japan
	Strongylocentrotus polyacanthus Agassiz and H. L. Clark, 1907		off Simushir Island
	Strongylocentrotus pulchellus Agassiz & H.L. Clark, 1907		Gulf of Jantary, SW coast of Sachalin
	Strongylocentrotus purpuratus (Stimpson, 1857)	purple sea urchin	Pacific Ocean extending from Ensenada, Mexico to British Columbia, Canada.

== See also ==
- Flabesymbios commensalis
