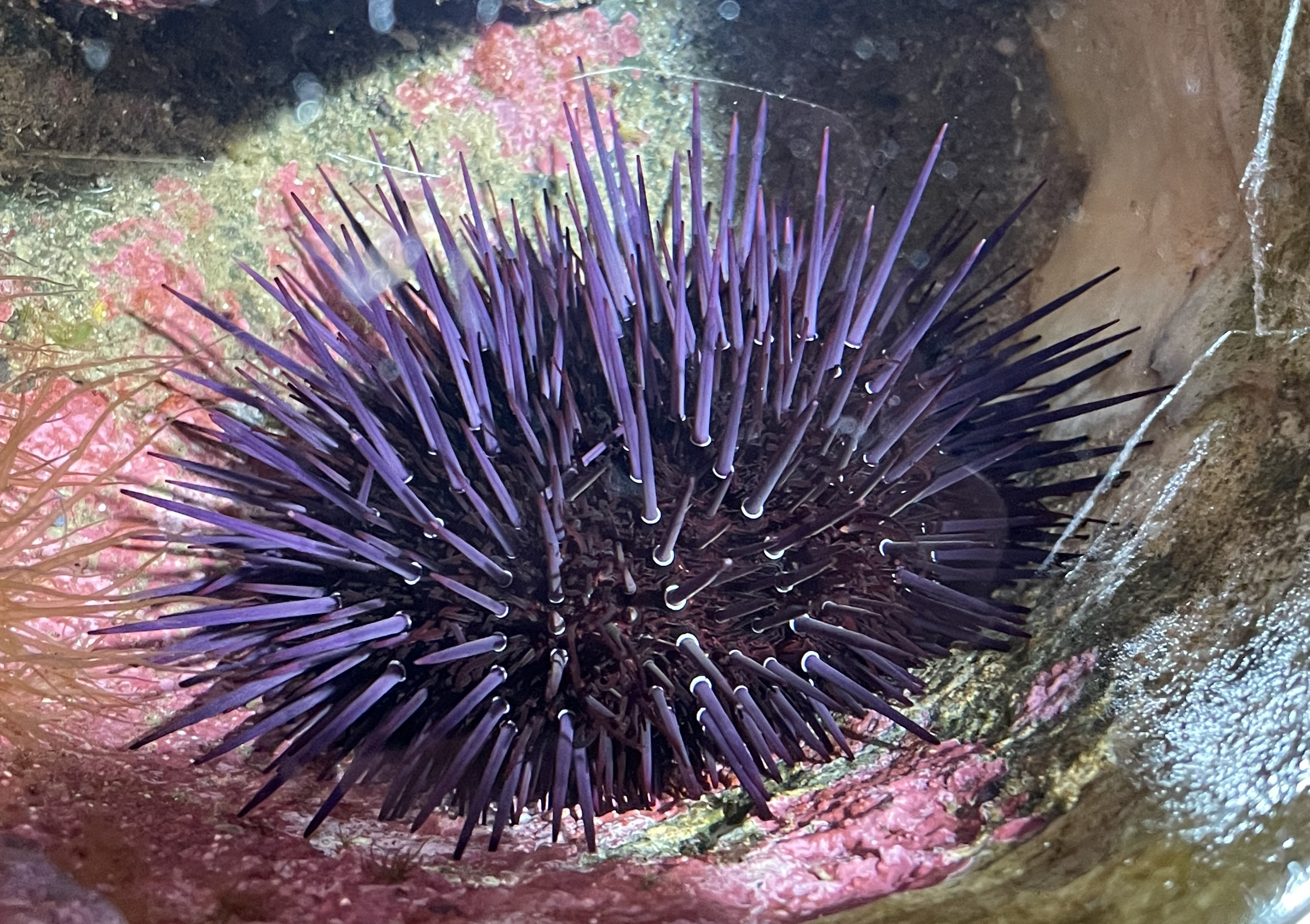

Scientific classification
- Kingdom: Animalia
- Phylum: Echinodermata
- Class: Echinoidea
- Order: Camarodonta
- Family: Strongylocentrotidae
- Genus: Pseudocentrotus
- Species: P. depressus

Binomial name
- Pseudocentrotus depressus (A. Agassiz, 1864)

Synonyms
- Echinus disjunctus von Martens, 1866; Strongylocentrotus depressus (A. Agassiz, 1864); Toxocidaris depressa A. Agassiz, 1864

= Pseudocentrotus depressus =

Species of sea urchin

Pseudocentrotus depressus, commonly known as the pink sea urchin, is a species of sea urchin, one of only two species in the genus Pseudocentrotus. It was first described in 1864 by the American marine zoologist Alexander Agassiz as Toxocidaris depressus, having been collected during the North Pacific Exploring and Surveying Expedition undertaken by Captain Cadwalader Ringgold and later Captain John Rodgers.

== Description ==
This sea urchin is distinctive in its shape, with the oral (lower) surface being flat and the aboral (upper) surface markedly depressed in the centre. The tubercles are numerous and even in size, and the spines are fine and short, their diameter being about a quarter of their length. The inter-ambulacral plates are broad and the pore pairs are arranged in slightly curved groups of six or seven pairs.

== Ecology ==
As is the case with most other sea urchins, the sexes are separate in this species, and adults liberate eggs and sperm into the water column. After fertilisation, the echinopluteus larvae spend several months swimming and drifting with the plankton. Metamorphosis is stimulated by the detection by the larvae of suitable locations to settle on the seabed, cues being provided by the presence on the substrate of films of micro-algae or of microbes. In the absence of a suitable habitat, the larvae can continue swimming, but metamorphosis will eventually happen even in the absence of these cues.

== Uses ==
Pseudocentrotus depressus is used for human consumption and is the most important species of sea urchin in the southern Japan fishery.
