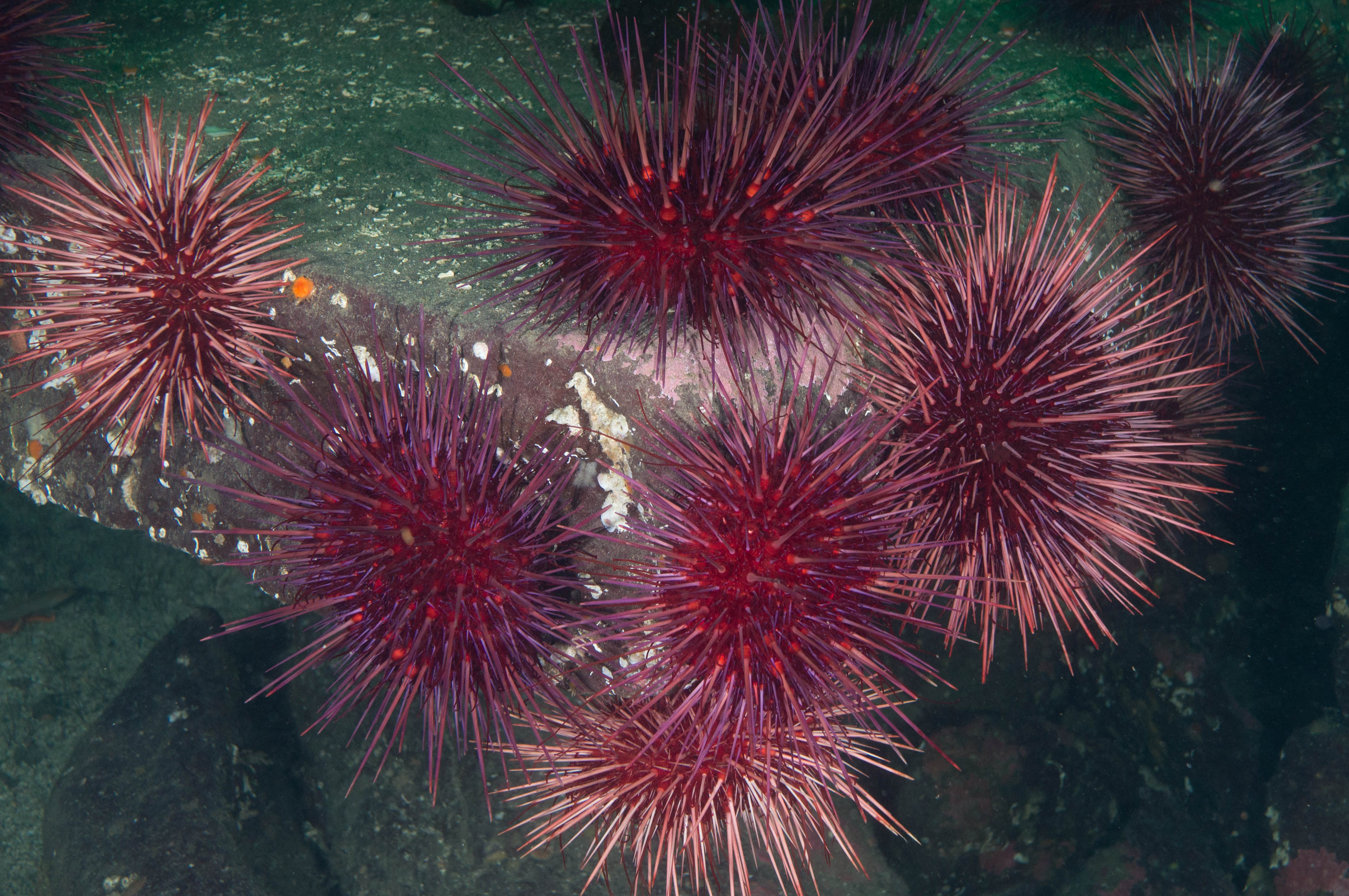
- Mesocentrotus franciscanus

Scientific classification
- Kingdom: Animalia
- Phylum: Echinodermata
- Class: Echinoidea
- Order: Camarodonta
- Family: Strongylocentrotidae
- Genus: Mesocentrotus; Tatarenko & Poltaraus, 1993

= Mesocentrotus =

Genus of sea urchins

Mesocentrotus is a genus of echinoderms belonging to the family Strongylocentrotidae.

The species of this genus are found in Japan and Northern America.

Species:

Image	Scientific name	Distribution
	Mesocentrotus franciscanus (Agassiz, 1863)	northeastern Pacific Ocean from Alaska to Baja California
	Mesocentrotus nudus (Agassiz, 1864)	northwest Pacific.
