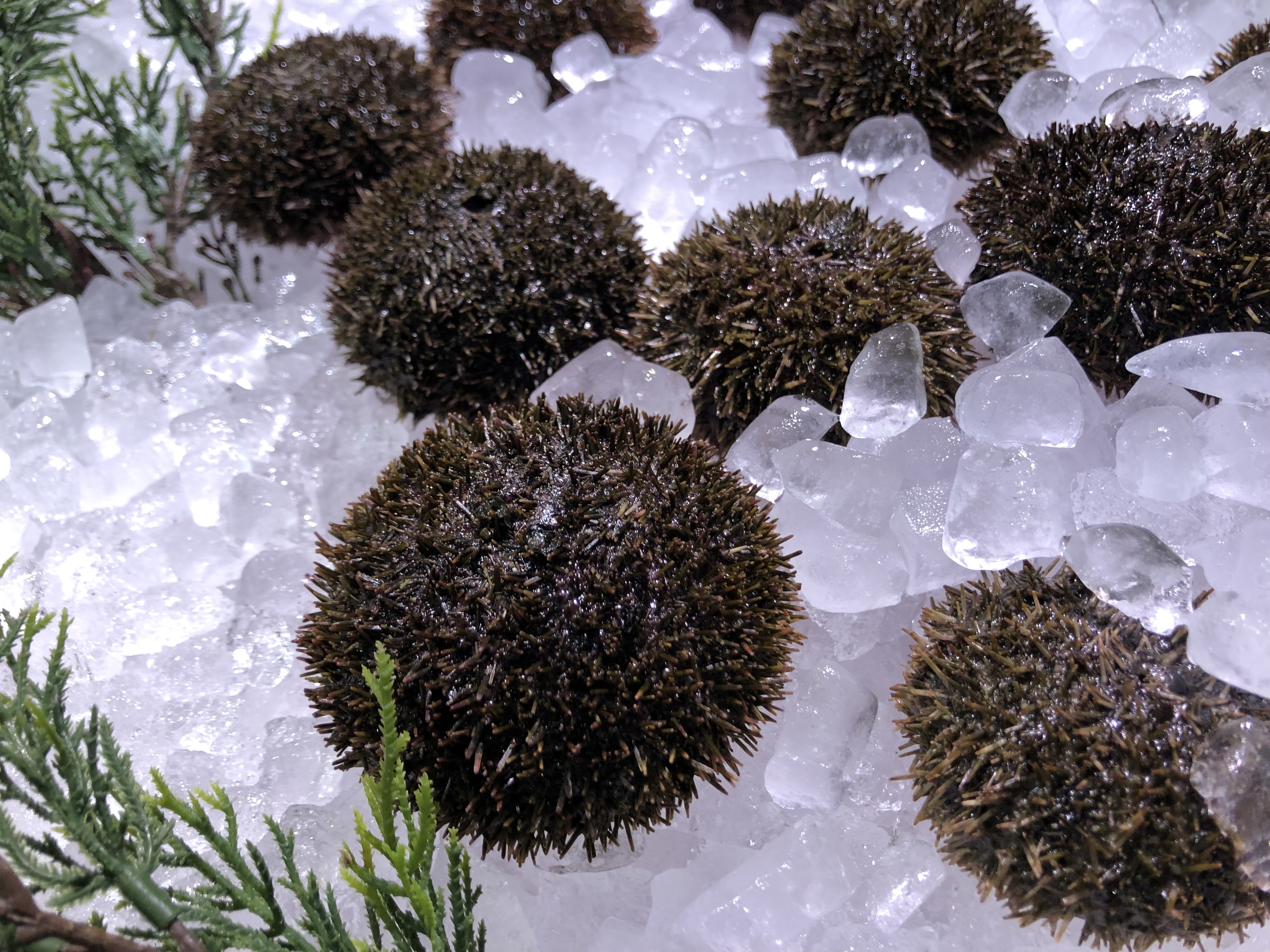

Scientific classification
- Kingdom: Animalia
- Phylum: Echinodermata
- Class: Echinoidea
- Order: Camarodonta
- Family: Strongylocentrotidae
- Genus: Hemicentrotus; Mortensen, 1942
- Species: H. pulcherrimus

Binomial name
- Hemicentrotus pulcherrimus (A. Agassiz, 1864)

Synonyms
- Discaster bernardi Michelin, M.S.; Holopneustes complanatus Herklots, M.S.; Psammechinus pulcherrimus A. Agassiz, 1864; Sphærechinus pulcherrimus (A. Agassiz, 1864); Strongylocentrotus pulcherrimus (A. Agassiz, 1863)

= Hemicentrotus =

Genus of sea urchins

Hemicentrotus pulcherrimus is a species of sea urchin, the only one in the monotypic genus Hemicentrotus. It was first described by the American engineer and marine zoologist Alexander Agassiz in 1864 as Psammechinus pulcherrimus. Its range extends along the coasts of Korea, Taiwan and China, and in Japan from Kyūshū to Ishikari Bay. An edible species, it is harvested from Kyūshū to Fukui, in the Sea of Japan.

== Description ==
This sea urchin has a thick test and a large number of tiny, fine, sharp spines. The tubercles are small and closely packed, arranged in slightly zig-zag horizontal rows, with four to eight tubercles on each inter-ambulacral plate and three on each ambulacral plate. The pores are arranged in diagonal lines of four, with the rows being separated by small tubercles. The colour of this sea urchin is pale greenish-olive above, and brownish-green below.

== Distribution ==
Hemicentrotus pulcherrimus is native to tropical waters in the western Central Pacific Ocean, the waters around Palau and the South China Sea. It occurs down to depths of about 45 m (150 ft), but it is mostly found on boulders in the intertidal zone and in the shallow subtidal zone at depths of less than 2 m (7 ft).

== Ecology ==
The species is herbivorous, grazing on marine algae. It mostly feeds on the red leafy alga Acrosorium polyneurum between December and March at the times of year when it is abundant, and migrating to areas of crustose coralline algae at other times of year when the red alga is scarce.

As is the case with other sea urchins, H. pulcherrimus liberates eggs and sperm into the water column and the echinopluteus larvae spend several months drifting with the plankton. They are stimulated to settle on the seabed by the attachment of diatoms and by the presence in the water of particles of an alga such as Hizikia fusiformis which grows around the coasts of Japan.

== Uses ==
In Japan, H. pulcherrimus has been harvested commercially as a seafood since the 1600s. It is eaten after being preserved with alcohol or brine, since it has a bitter taste when raw.
