= Arenicella chitinivorans =

Scientific classification
- Domain: Bacteria
- Kingdom: Pseudomonadati
- Phylum: Pseudomonadota
- Class: Gammaproteobacteria
- Order: Arenicellales
- Family: Arenicellaceae
- Genus: Arenicella
- Species: A. chitinivorans

Binomial name
- Arenicella chitinivorans Nedashkovskaya et al. 2013

Type strain
- KCTC 12711, KMM 6208, LMG 26983

Species of bacterium

Arenicella chitinivorans is a Gram-negative, rod-shaped, strictly aerobic and non-motile bacterium from the genus Arenicella which has been isolated from the sea urchin Strongylocentrotus intermedius.
