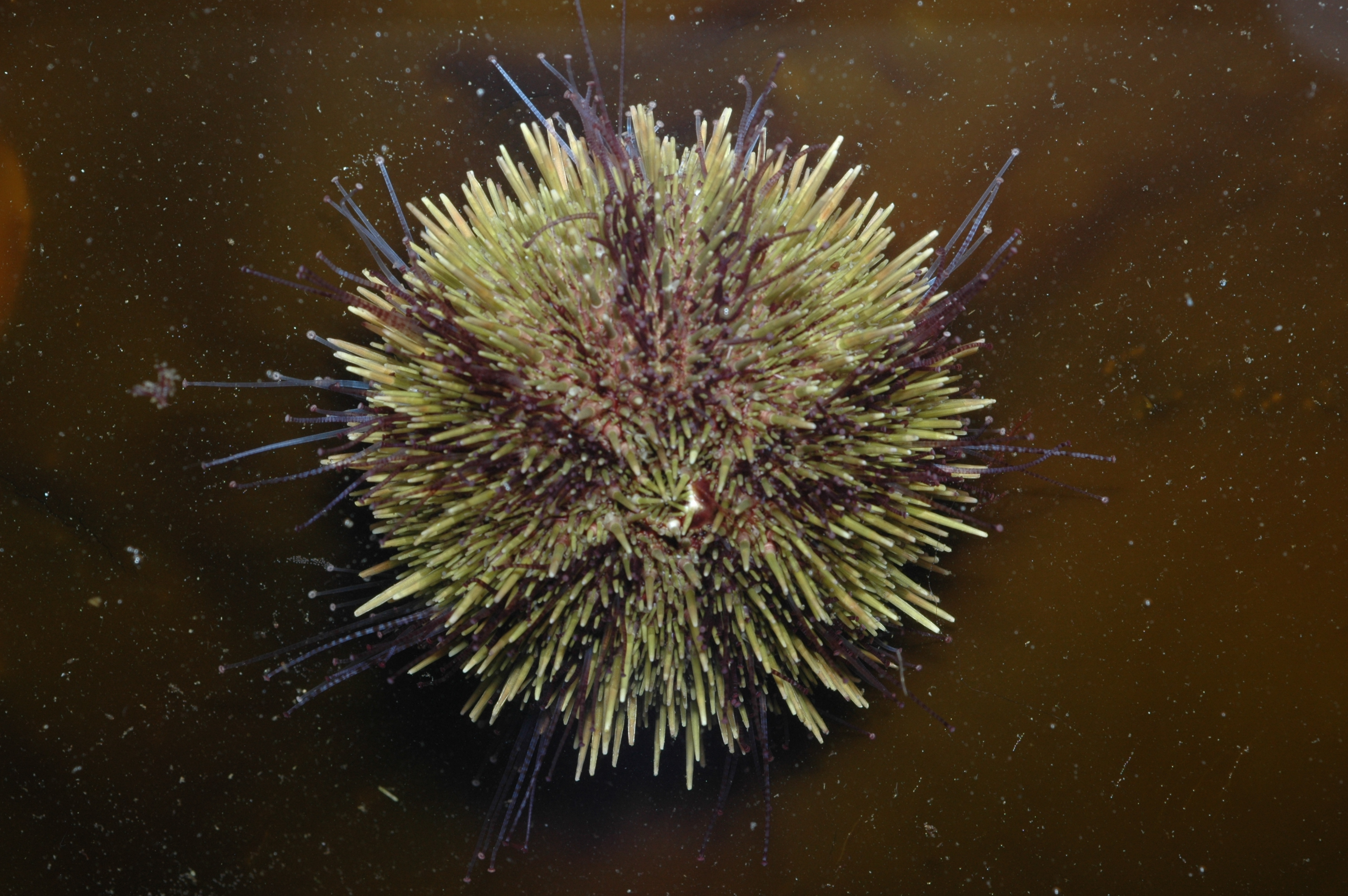

Conservation status
- Secure (NatureServe)

Scientific classification
- Kingdom: Animalia
- Phylum: Echinodermata
- Class: Echinoidea
- Order: Camarodonta
- Family: Strongylocentrotidae
- Genus: Strongylocentrotus
- Species: S. droebachiensis

Binomial name
- Strongylocentrotus droebachiensis (Müller, 1776)
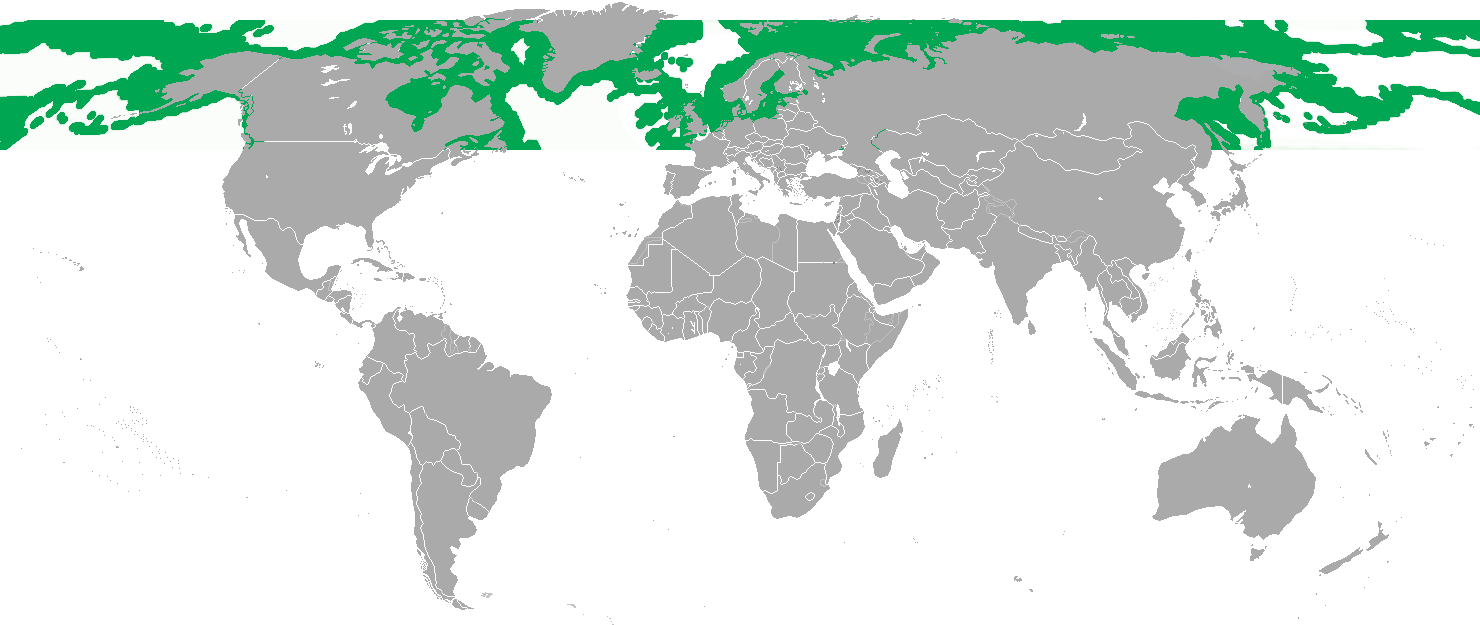
- Strongylocentrotus droebachiensis range

Synonyms
- List: Strongylocentrotus Draebachiensis (lapsus calami); Echinus dröbachiensis O.F. Müller, 1776; Echinus droebachiensis O.F. Müller, 1776; Toxopneustes droebachiensis (O.F. Müller, 1776); Echinometra droebachiensis (O.F. Müller, 1776); Euryechinus droebachiensis (O.F. Müller, 1776); Echinus (Toxopneustes) droebachiensis (O.F. Müller, 1776); Strongylocentrotus granularis (Say, 1827 non Lamarck, 1816); Echinus subangularis Fleming, 1829; Strongylocentrotus chlorocentrotus Brandt, 1835; Echinus chlorocentrotus Des Moulins, 1837; Strongylocentrotus chlorocentrotus (Des Moulins, 1837); Euryechinus granulatus (Gould, 1841); Echinus (Toxopneustes) dübenii L. Agassiz in L. Agassiz & Desor, 1846; Echinus pictus (Norman, 1869); Strongylocentrotus pictus (Norman, 1869)

= Strongylocentrotus droebachiensis =

Species of sea urchin

Strongylocentrotus droebachiensis, commonly known as the green sea urchin because of its characteristic green color, is a species of sea urchin commonly found in northern waters all around the world including both the Pacific and Atlantic Oceans to a northerly latitude of 81 degrees and as far south as Maine (in the U.S.) and England.

The average adult size is around 50 mm (2 in), but it has been recorded at a diameter of 87 mm (3.4 in). The green sea urchin prefers to eat seaweeds but will eat other organisms. They are eaten by a variety of predators, including sea stars, crabs, large fish, mammals, birds, and humans. The species name "droebachiensis" is derived from the name of the town Drøbak in Norway.

== Habitat ==
Strongylocentrotus droebachiensis is found on rocky substratum in the intertidal and up to depths of 1,150 meters (3,770 ft). It uses its strong Aristotle's lantern to burrow into rock, and then can widen its home with the spines. Usually, this sea urchin can leave its hole to find food and then return, but sometimes it creates a hole that gets bigger as it gets deeper, so that the opening is too small for S. droebachiensis to get out. S. droebachiensis is a euryhaline species, and can survive in waters of low salinity. This allows it to flourish in southern Puget Sound. Acclimation and size are important factors as larger individuals have a lower surface area to volume ratio and can handle the increased osmotic tension.

== Anatomy ==
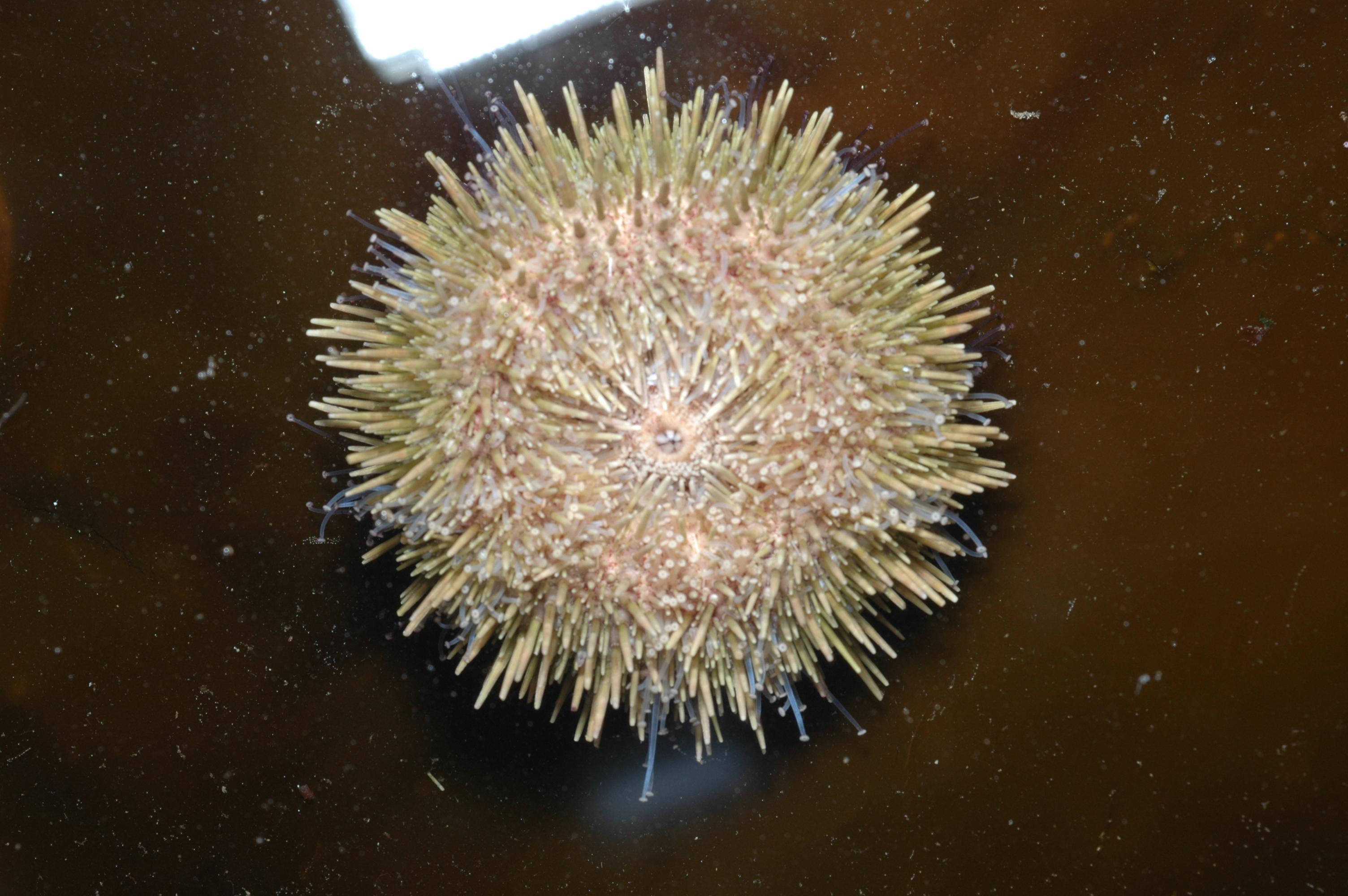
Underside of S. droebacheinsis

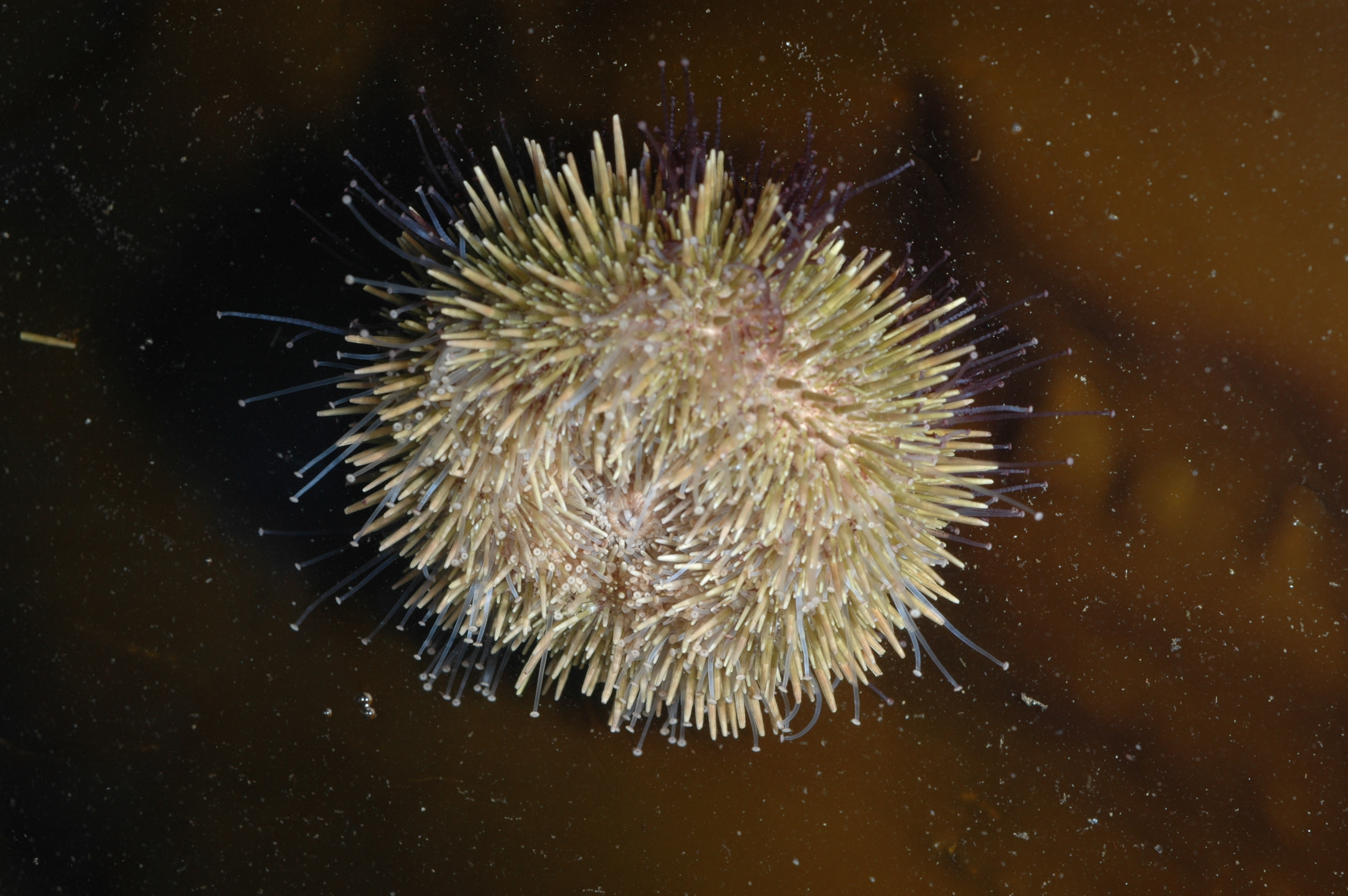
S. droebachiensis righting itself

=== External anatomy ===
Strongylocentrotus droebachiensis is in the shape of a slightly flattened globe (dorsoventrally). The oral side rests against the substratum and the aboral side (the side with the anus) is in the opposite direction. It has pentameric symmetry, which is visible in the five paired rows of podia (tube feet) that run from the anus to the mouth. The size is calculated as the diameter of the test (the body not including the spines). This is a relatively fast growing sea urchin, and its age is generally calculable based on its size: one year for every 10 mm.

==== Test ====
Twenty curved plates, or ossicles, are fused together to form a rigid test or exoskeleton. They are made of calcium carbonate, and have two rows of holes for the tube feet to pass through. If the test is cracked or chunks are removed, calcium carbonate will slowly fill in the gaps left behind until a complete and rigid test is regained.

==== Spines ====
The spines of Strongylocentrotus droebachiensis are used for defense and locomotion and are not considered poisonous. The spines attach to small tubercles on the test where they are held in place by muscles creating a ball and socket joint. They are round, tapering to a point, with ridges around the outside in a fan-like design made of calcium carbonate. Usually, the longest spines are around the peripheral edge of the animal. If broken, the spines will regenerate, and if completely torn off, the tubercle will be reabsorbed to fit the slowly growing spine.

==== Tube feet ====
Tube feet are a structure that help Strongylocentrotus droebachiensis attach to the substratum for stabilization or locomotion, or to move loose food particles to the mouth. The tube feet are quite flexible and can extend beyond the length of the spikes to reach the substratum or attach onto particles floating in the water. They come out of five pairs of rows through the test structure.

The tube feet of S. droebachiensis are actually composed of two parts: the ampulla and the podium. The ampulla is a hollow bulbous structure that raises the tube foot above the skeletal plates that surround the lateral canal. The podia extend off the ampulla and contain the muscular suckered structure used for attachment. The movement of the tube foot depends on the hydraulic pressure of the water vascular system, and individual muscle action. When the ampulla contracts, it forces the liquid into the podia which elongates. Once the podia has attached itself to the substrate, the longitudinal muscles of the podia constrict forcing that liquid back into the ampulla causing the podia to shrink and pulling the body in that direction, or food closer to the mouth. Tube feet that have been pulled off as the sea urchin is thrown around by the sea will quickly regenerate.

==== Pedicellariae ====
Echinoderms of the classes Asteroidea (sea stars) and Echinoidea (sea urchins/sand dollars) have three small pincher-like jaws held up by a calcareous stalk, called pedicellariae, at the base of the spines on the body. These have the ability to respond to outside stimuli separately from the main nervous system. Historically thought of as parasites or larvae of the sea urchin, it is now commonly believed that the pedicellariae are actually part of the living creature. The muscles that control them are outside of the test, and therefore must get nutrients from a different source: they have possibly developed the ability to absorb nutrients directly from the surrounding water.

Pedicellariae are used by the sea urchin by keeping detritus from collecting on the body, or collecting kelp to use as a defense from the drying abilities of the sunlight. Their pinching jaws can even be used to defend against possible predators, and some are even poisonous on S. droebachiensis. If the spikes are lightly touched, they converge toward the pressure, but if they are strongly pushed, then they spread apart so that the pedicellariae can pinch the intruder. One of the four main types of pedicellariae on S. droebachiensis is actually poisonous and can be used for defense, or to paralyze small fish (although this species prefers algae, it will catch and eat fish for supplemental food).

=== Internal anatomy ===
==== Water vascular system ====
The water vascular system is a series of canals through which fluid moves to help propel the podia of the sea urchin. The fluid that fills the water vascular system is similar to marine water, but also has free wandering cells and organic compounds such as proteins and a high concentration of potassium ions when compared to the surrounding sea water. This liquid is moved through the system by cilia that line the inside of the canal and help keep the fluid moving in the desired direction.

The structure of the water vascular system contains several calcareous parts before moving to the podia. The first is called the madreporite. This is a skeletal plate, or sieve, opening to the water vascular system, located on the aboral surface. Just underneath the madreporite, is a cup-like depression called the ampulla. Next the stone canal carries the liquid into the central disc of the urchin. Finally, five lateral canals run along the inside of the test and converge at the aboral pole. Along this entire distance, tube feet emerge from the lateral canal through the test to outside the epidermis of the sea urchin.

==== Aristotle's lantern ====
Strongylocentrotus droebachiensis eats by using a special appendage called an Aristotle’s lantern to scrape or tear their food into digestible bits. This structure is made of five calcareous, protractible teeth that are maneuvered by a complex muscular structure. The sea urchin crawls on top of its food and uses the Aristotle's lantern to tear up and masticate chunks of it. If food lands on the aboral surface or is caught by pedicellariae, then it is carried via podia to the mouth and devoured in the same manner.

==== Digestive system ====
The digestive system begins with the Aristotle’s lantern, where the food enters the body of the sea urchin. An esophagus extends from the mouth through the center of the Aristotle’s lantern, where it joins up with an intestine. The intestine is arranged in little bundles that adhere to the inside of the test in a counter-clockwise circuit around the Aristotle’s lantern. Once the intestine gets back to itself, it doubles over itself and reverses directions in a second clockwise direction. Digestive enzymes are produced by the intestinal walls and breakdown of food is almost completely extracellular. From the intestine, what is left of the food moves out of the intestine into the short rectum, and out the anus. S. droebachiensis gets its green color from the pigments of its plant food.

==== Nervous system ====
In the nervous system of sea urchins the spines, podia, and pedicellariae all act as sensors. A circular nerve ring encircles the esophagus, and radial nerves extend inside of the test parallel to the lateral canals of the water vascular system. Sensory neurons in the epidermis can detect touch, chemicals, and light, and are usually associated with pedicellariae or spines.

== Reproduction and development ==
Sea urchins are dioecious, meaning they either contain male or female reproductive organs. They contain five gonads tucked under the test. These are located close to the anus and are protected by genital plates. One of these plates is perforated, and also acts as the madreporite. Sea urchins all release their eggs or sperm directly into the water column at the same time to ensure fertilization. It is not understood what causes S. droebachiensis to release their sperm or eggs, but it may have to do with temperature, because they usually reproduce in early spring.

Once fertilized, the gamete grows via mitosis and eventually becomes a larva capable of simple swimming called an echinoplutes. The metamorphosis from larva to a radially symmetrical adult is hugely complex, and only some of the more basic details are included here. The larva swims to the appropriate substratum where it attaches, usually with the “left and right” sides of the larva, becoming the “mouth and anus” sides. The embryonic openings for the mouth and the anus disappear completely, and new openings are created in the proper position. The ring canal grows radial extensions becoming the lateral canals. At this point in development, the sea urchin settles down to a benthic life.

== Ecology ==
Snails of the families Melanellidae and Stiliferidae live on the surface of the test and adhere their own eggs to the base of the spines as protection.

S. droebachiensis feeds on algae, preferring species like Sargassum muticum and Mazzaella japonica over Saccharina latissima, Ulva, and Chondracanthus exasperatus.

In coastal Nova Scotia, a disease known as paramoebiasis can cause mass mortality events in S. droebachiensis, and exert a major control on abundance. Paramoebiasis is caused by a protist, Paramoeba invadens, which is a member of the taxon Amoebozoa. Mass mortality events are strongly associated with water temperature (threshold ~12°C), but it is thought that storms may play a role in introducing the amoeba to susceptible populations.

=== Predation ===
The most largely known predators of the green sea urchin consists of a variety of fish, crustaceans, and echinoderms. Sea stars, wolffish, lobsters, and crabs have all been observed to prey upon the green sea urchin when available, though this is no easy task due to the spines on the urchin which deters most predators such as small fish.

== Relation to humans ==
=== As food ===
The green urchin is edible, and is known to have been eaten by the Native peoples of New Brunswick from archaeological remains. It is harvested and eaten year round by the Inuit of the Belcher Islands.

It is also harvested for export in, among other places, Newfoundland and Labrador, Iceland and Norway. In France, the urchin is often found as a part of the Plateau de fruits de mer.

It has been used in fine dining by chefs such as René Redzepi in raw and cured forms.

The urchin is now more commonly being farmed via Aquaculture for its roe that is considered a valuable and heavily sought-after food in places overseas such as Japan.

=== Fishing methods ===
The green urchin is fished using different techniques.

In Iceland, Breiðafjörður, it is trawled at from 8 to 30 meters depth. The fishery is regulated.

In Norway, small quantities are fished by hand by freedivers and SCUBA-divers. The fishery is not regulated, and the green sea urchin is considered a pest in the Norwegian waters, eating up the kelp forest. It is not common to find the green sea urchin south of Hitra, and the urchin population is moving northward as water temperatures increase.

In Canada (Newfoundland and Labrador and British Columbia), fishing is by SCUBA-divers in a regulated fishery.

In the United States, regulations vary depending on state. In Maine, it is both trawled and fished by SCUBA depending on the specific location. The peak season in Maine is September-March. The fishery is regulated. In Washington (state), it is fished by divers in a regulated fishery.

=== Aquaculture ===
Strongylocentrotus droebachiensis has been farmed in the United States since roughly 1998 primarily due to the large demand for the roe which is a delicacy in many countries especially Japan. Despite only having been farmed in the United States for a little over twenty years other countries such as China, Norway, Ireland, and Japan all have had or now have aquaculture facilities that specifically focus upon the successful production and harvesting of the green sea urchin.

=== Conservation status ===
The green sea urchin is observed to be under no potential threat of extinction or at risk of overfishing or currently being overfished.
