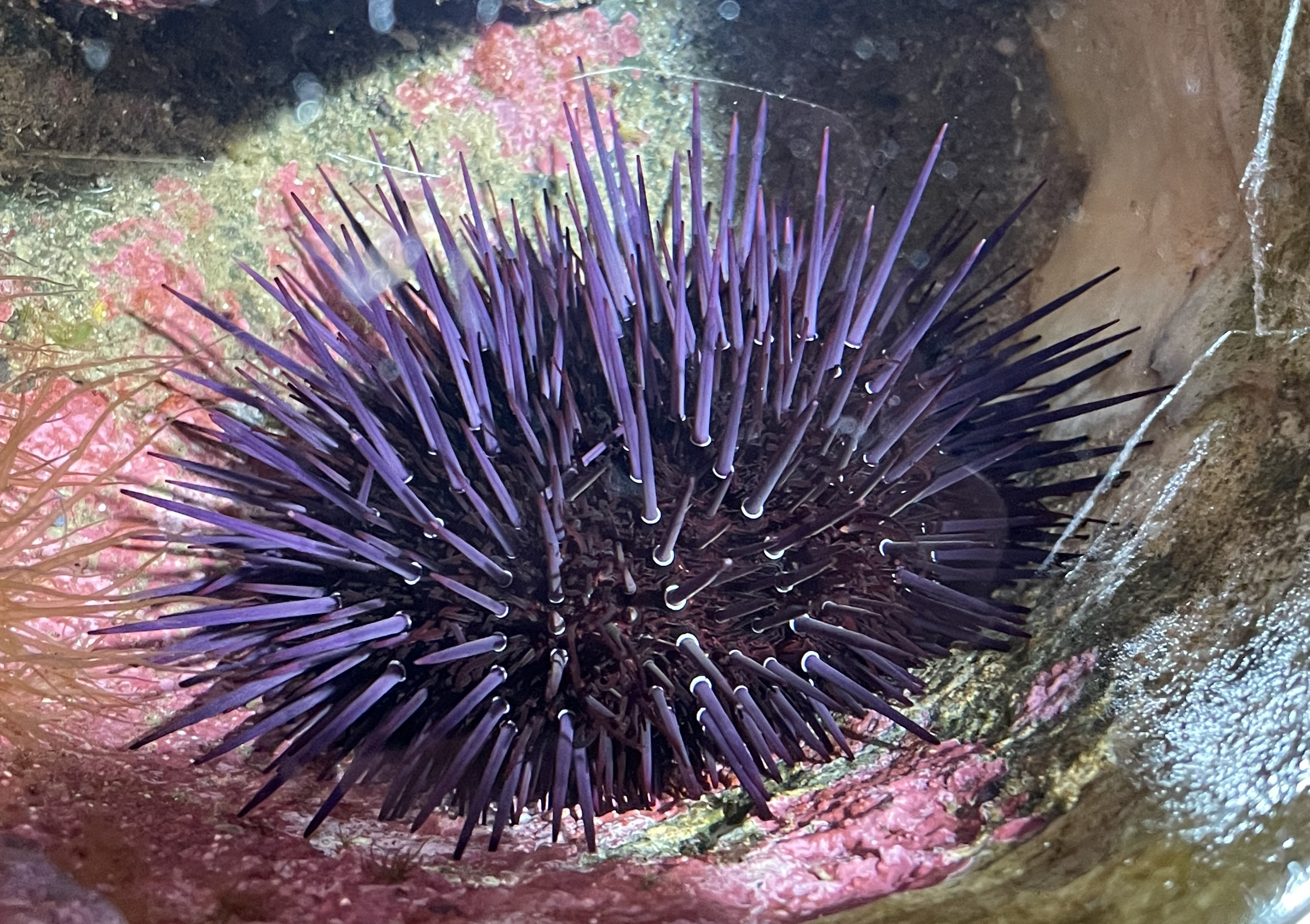
- Pseudocentrotus depressus

Scientific classification
- Kingdom: Animalia
- Phylum: Echinodermata
- Class: Echinoidea
- Order: Camarodonta
- Family: Strongylocentrotidae
- Genus: Pseudocentrotus; Mortensen, 1903

= Pseudocentrotus =

Genus of sea urchins

Pseudocentrotus is a genus of echinoderms belonging to the family Strongylocentrotidae.

The species of this genus are found in Japan.

Species:

- Pseudocentrotus depressus (A. Agassiz, 1864)
- Pseudocentrotus stenoporus Nisiyama, 1966
