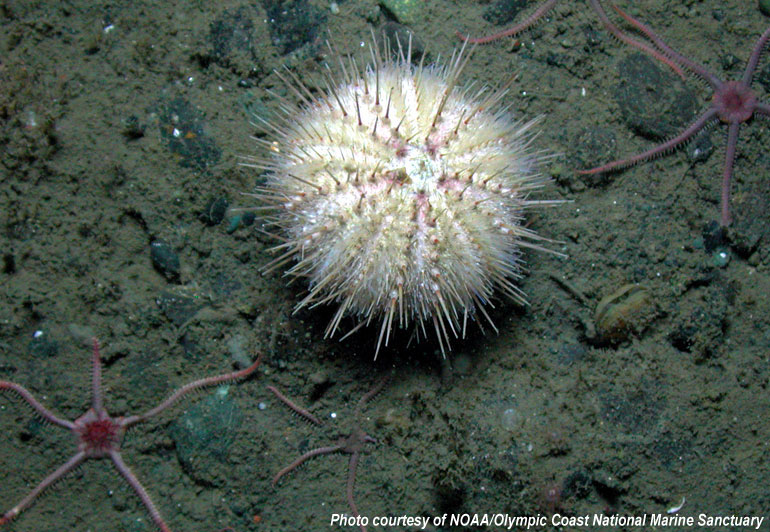

Conservation status
- Secure (NatureServe)

Scientific classification
- Kingdom: Animalia
- Phylum: Echinodermata
- Class: Echinoidea
- Order: Camarodonta
- Family: Strongylocentrotidae
- Genus: Strongylocentrotus
- Species: S. pallidus

Binomial name
- Strongylocentrotus pallidus (G.O. Sars, 1871)

= Strongylocentrotus pallidus =

Species of sea urchin

Strongylocentrotus pallidus, or the pale sea urchin, is a species of sea urchin found in rocky areas in Norway, off Russia from the Barents Sea down to the central part of the Sea of Japan.
