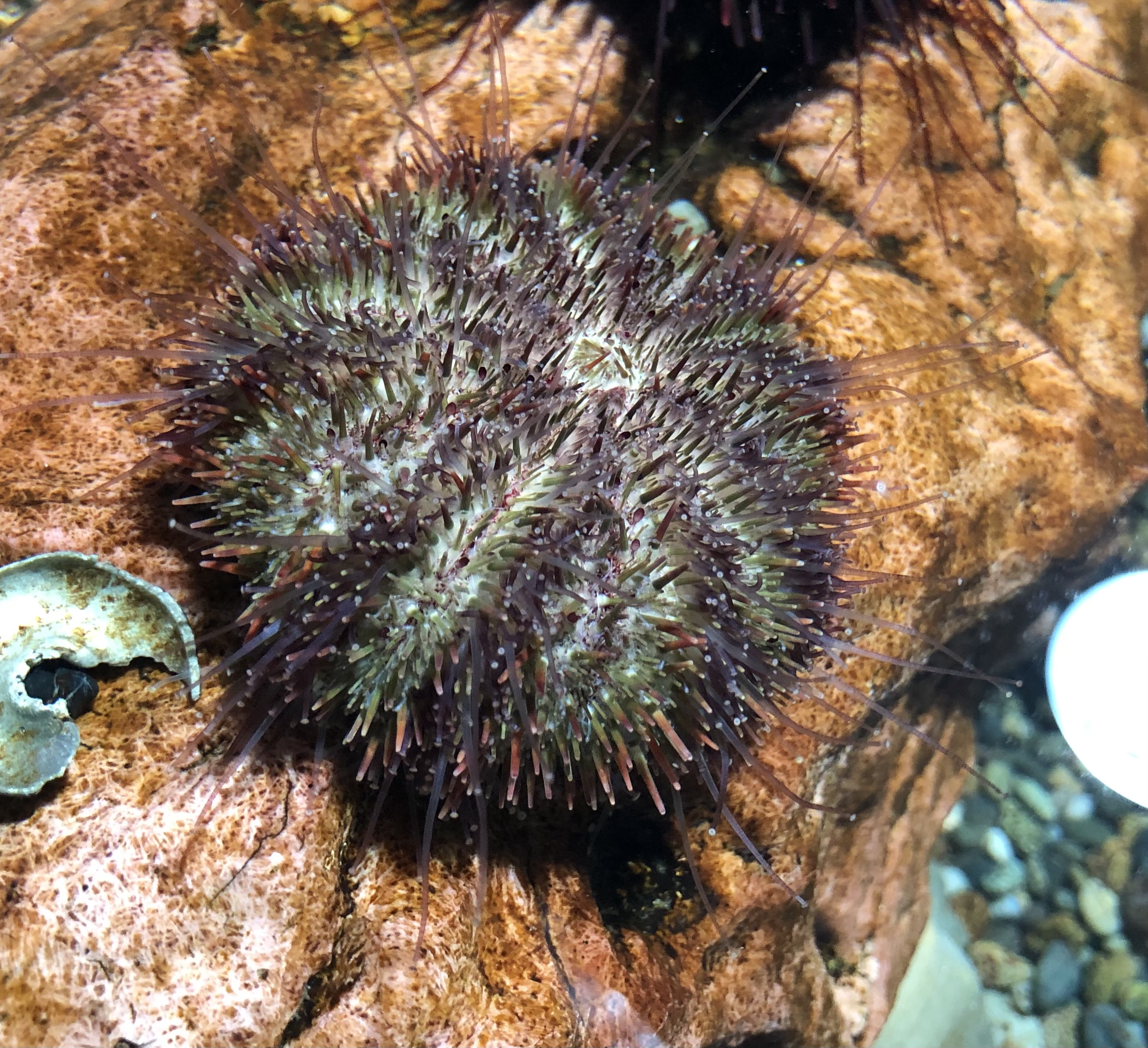

Scientific classification
- Kingdom: Animalia
- Phylum: Echinodermata
- Class: Echinoidea
- Order: Camarodonta
- Family: Strongylocentrotidae
- Genus: Strongylocentrotus
- Species: S. intermedius

Binomial name
- Strongylocentrotus intermedius (A. Agassiz, 1864)

= Strongylocentrotus intermedius =

Species of sea urchin

Strongylocentrotus intermedius is a species of sea urchin described by Alexander Agassiz in 1864.

== Genomics ==
A chromosome-level genome assembly of Strongylocentrotus intermedius was published in 2026. The genome size is approximately 705 Mb, with 97.77% of the sequence assembled into 21 chromosomes. The assembly has a BUSCO completeness of 91.72%, and 23,127 protein-coding genes were predicted. Comparative genomic analysis identified an expansion of gene families involved in fatty acid biosynthesis, particularly the Elovl gene family.
