= Arenicella xantha =

Scientific classification
- Domain: Bacteria
- Kingdom: Pseudomonadati
- Phylum: Pseudomonadota
- Class: Gammaproteobacteria
- Order: Arenicellales
- Family: Arenicellaceae
- Genus: Arenicella
- Species: A. xantha

Binomial name
- Arenicella xantha Romanenko et al. 2010

Type strain
- JCM 16153, KMM 3895, NRIC 0759

Species of bacterium

Arenicella xantha is a Gram-negative, rod-shaped, aerobic and non-motile bacterium from the genus Arenicella which has been isolated from offshore sediments from the Sea of Japan in Russia.
