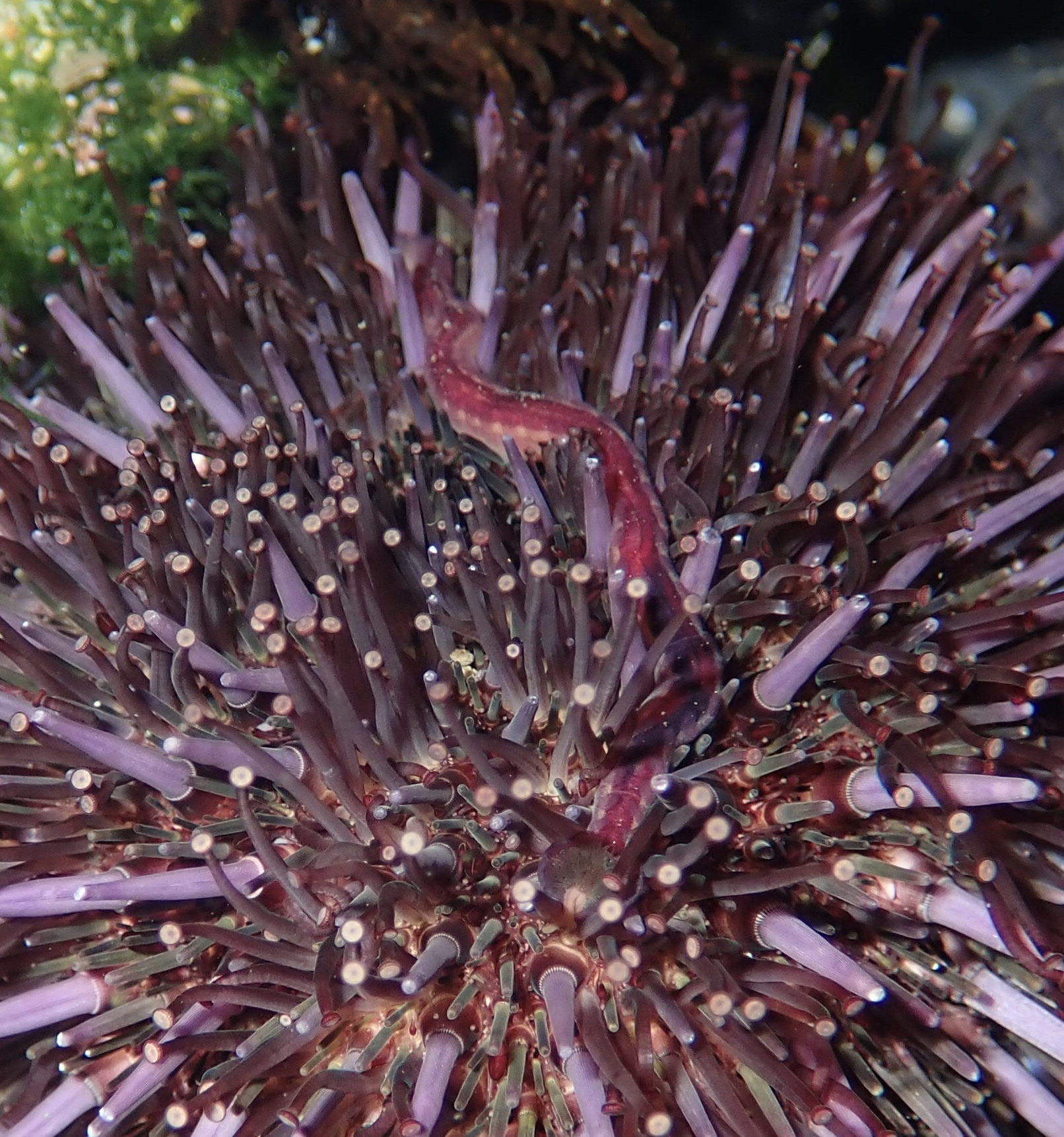

Scientific classification
- Kingdom: Animalia
- Phylum: Annelida
- Clade: Pleistoannelida
- Clade: Sedentaria
- Order: Terebellida
- Family: Flabelligeridae
- Genus: Flabesymbios
- Species: F. commensalis

Binomial name
- Flabesymbios commensalis Moore, 1909

Synonyms
- Flabelligera commensalis Moore, 1909

= Flabesymbios commensalis =

Species of worm

Flabesymbios commensalis is a species of marine worm that lives in sea urchin spikes. According to recent research, F. commensalis has a two-color body and lives on urchins in the genus Strongylocentrotus. It has been found along the Pacific coast of North America.
