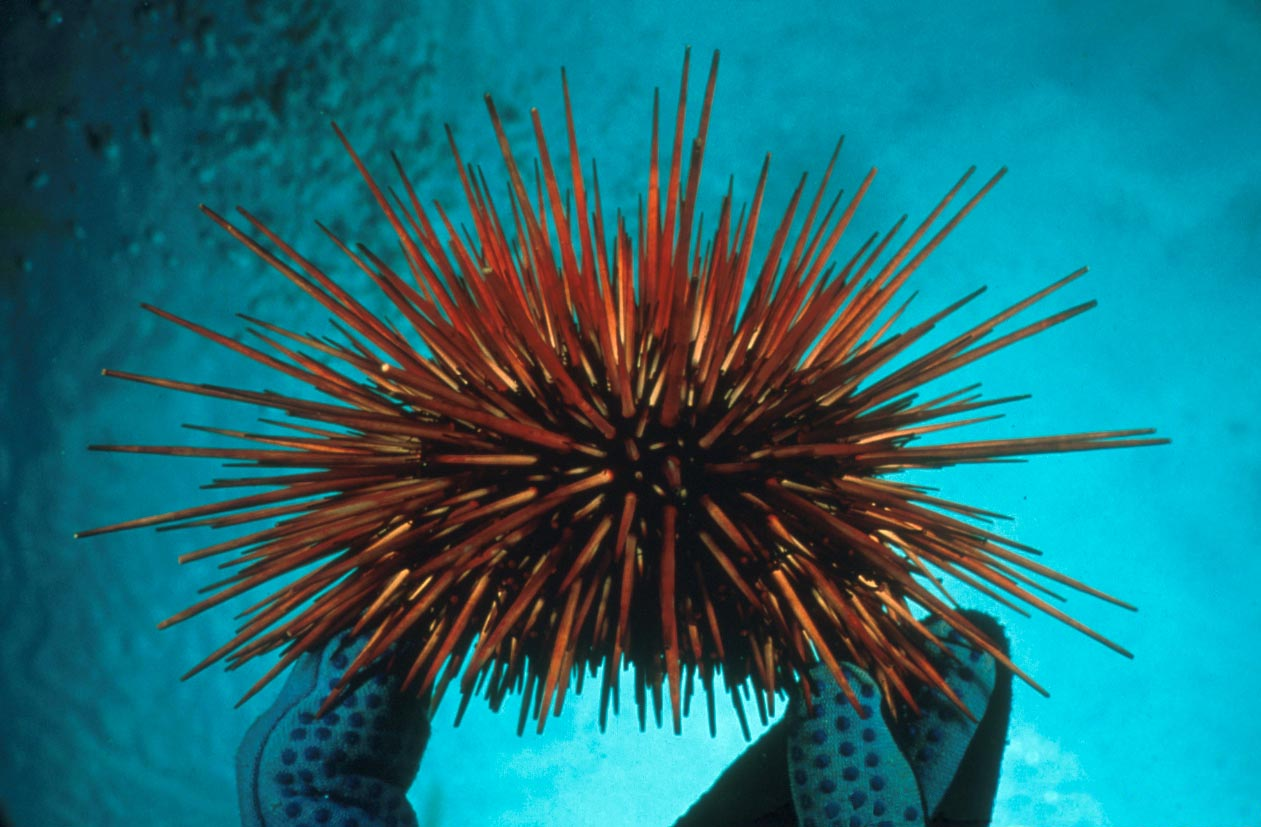
- red sea urchin (Mesocentrotus franciscanus)

Scientific classification
- Kingdom: Animalia
- Phylum: Echinodermata
- Class: Echinoidea
- Order: Camarodonta
- Infraorder: Echinidea
- Family: Strongylocentrotidae; Gregory, 1900

Genera
- Hemicentrotus; Mesocentrotus; Pseudocentrotus; Strongylocentrotus

= Strongylocentrotidae =

Family of sea urchins

The Strongylocentrotidae are a family of sea urchins in the order Camarodonta.

== Genera ==
Image	Genus	Species
	Hemicentrotus Mortensen, 1942	Hemicentrotus pulcherrimus (A. Agassiz, 1863)
	Mesocentrotus Tatarenko & Poltaraus, 1993	Mesocentrotus franciscanus (A. Agassiz, 1863); Mesocentrotus nudus (A. Agassiz, 1863)
	Pseudocentrotus Mortensen, 1903b	Pseudocentrotus depressus (A. Agassiz, 1863); Pseudocentrotus stenoporus Nisiyama, 1966 †
	Strongylocentrotus Brandt, 1835	Strongylocentrotus antiquus Philip, 1965 †; Strongylocentrotus djakonovi Baranova, 1957; Strongylocentrotus droebachiensis (Müller, 1776); Strongylocentrotus fragilis Jackson, 1912; Strongylocentrotus intermedius (A. Agassiz, 1863); Strongylocentrotus magistrus Nisiyama, 1966 †; Strongylocentrotus octoporus Nisiyama, 1966 †; Strongylocentrotus pallidus (Sars G.O., 1871); Strongylocentrotus polyacanthus A. Agassizz & H.L. Clark, 1907; Strongylocentrotus polyacathus A. Agassiz & H.L. Clark, 1907; Strongylocentrotus pulchellus A. Agassiz & H.L. Clark, 1907; Strongylocentrotus purpuratus (Stimpson, 1857)
