= Arenicella =

Scientific classification
- Domain: Bacteria
- Kingdom: Pseudomonadati
- Phylum: Pseudomonadota
- Class: Gammaproteobacteria
- Order: Arenicellales
- Family: Arenicellaceae
- Genus: Arenicella; Romanenko et al. 2010

Type species
- Arenicella xantha

Species
- Arenicella chitinivorans Arenicella xantha

Genus of bacteria

Arenicella is a genus of bacteria from the class Gammaproteobacteria.
