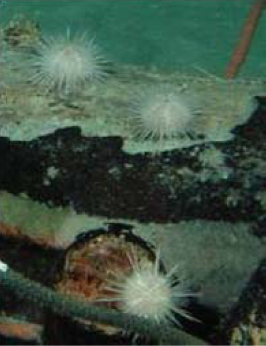

Scientific classification
- Kingdom: Animalia
- Phylum: Echinodermata
- Class: Echinoidea
- Order: Camarodonta
- Family: Trigonocidaridae
- Genus: Asterechinus; Mortensen, 1942
- Species: A. elegans

Binomial name
- Asterechinus elegans Mortensen, 1942

= Asterechinus =

Species of sea urchin

Asterechinus elegans is a species of sea urchin of the family Trigonocidaridae. Their armour is covered with spines. It is the only species in the genus Asterechinus and lives in the sea. Asterechinus elegans was first scientifically described in 1942 by Ole Theodor Jensen Mortensen.
