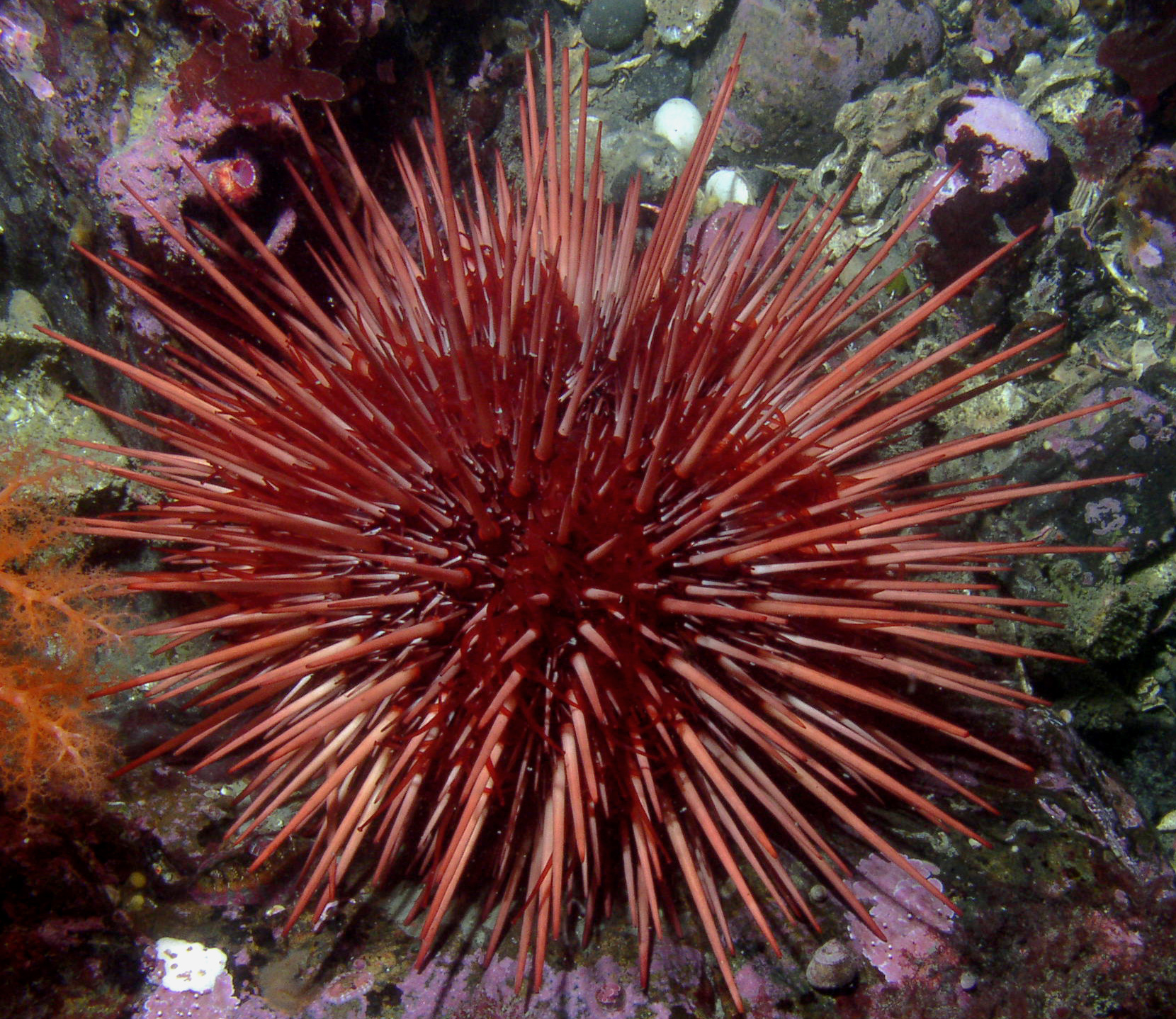

Conservation status
- Secure (NatureServe)

Scientific classification
- Kingdom: Animalia
- Phylum: Echinodermata
- Class: Echinoidea
- Order: Camarodonta
- Family: Strongylocentrotidae
- Genus: Mesocentrotus
- Species: M. franciscanus

Binomial name
- Mesocentrotus franciscanus (Aggasiz, 1863)

Synonyms
- Mesocentrotus franciscanus; Toxocidaris franciscana; Toxocidaris franciscanus; Strongylocentrotus franciscanus

= Red sea urchin =

Species of echinoderm

The red sea urchin (Mesocentrotus franciscanus) is a sea urchin found in the northeastern Pacific Ocean from Alaska to Baja California. It lives in shallow waters from the low-tide line to greater than 280 m (920 ft) deep, and is typically found on rocky shores sheltered from extreme wave action in areas where kelp is available.

== Description ==
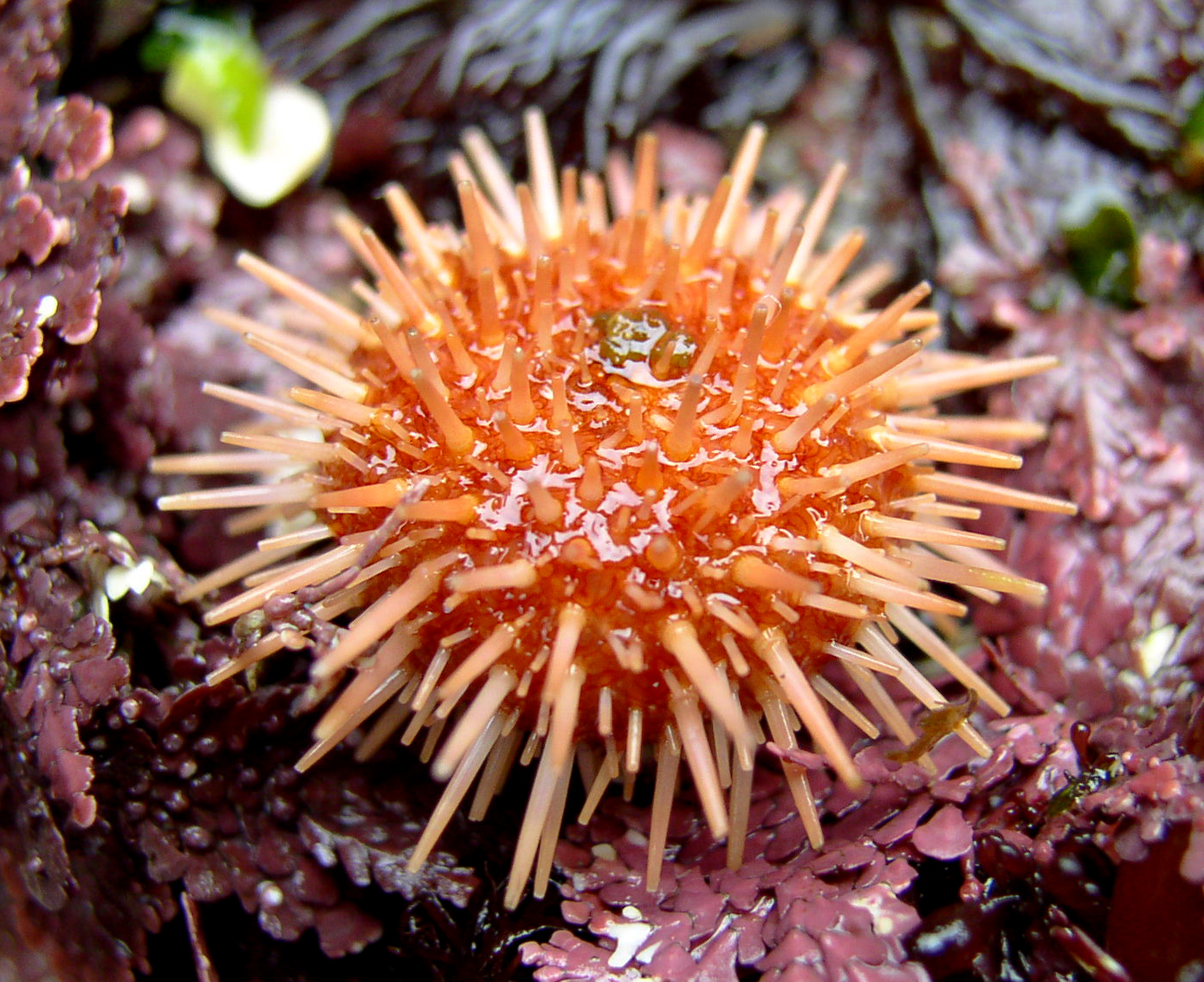
M. franciscanus juvenile, found at Cape Flattery, WA: This individual is about 1.5 cm in diameter.

A sea urchin's spherical body is completely covered by sharp spines. These spines grow on a hard shell called the "test", which encloses the animal. It can vary in color from red to dark burgundy. Rarely, albino specimens are found. It has a mouth located on its underside, which is surrounded by five teeth. During larval development, the body of a sea urchin transitions from bilateral to radial symmetry.

This bilaterally symmetrical larva, called an echinopluteus, subsequently develops a type of pentaradiate symmetry that characterizes echinoderms. It crawls very slowly over the sea bottom using its spines as stilts, with the help of its tube feet. Scattered among its spines are rows of tiny tube feet with suckers that help it to move and stick to the sea floor.

== Feeding habits ==
This animal has a mouth with special jaws (Aristotle's lantern) located on the bottom (oral) surface. Its preferred diet is seaweeds and algae, including giant kelp (Macrocystis pyrifera) and bull kelp (Nereocystis luetkeana), which it scrapes off and tears up from the sea floor. Adults may consume plankton and algae (particularly Lithothamnion sp. and Bossiella sp.) if other food sources are not available. During larval development, urchins use bands of cilia to capture food (namely zooplankton) from the water column. Red sea urchins found in the channel adjacent to San Juan Island have been found to live a uniquely sedentary lifestyle with the heavy currents bringing an abundance of food.

== Behavior and reproduction ==
Sea urchins are often found living in groups of five to ten individuals. They can regenerate lost spines. Their lifespan frequently exceeds 30 years, and marine biologists have discovered some species with dramatically longer lifespans; certain individuals have been estimated to live for more than 200 years. Red sea urchins are notoriously ravenous kelp-eaters and are implicated in devastating kelp beds by forming grazing fronts. The intense grazing pressure exerted by urchins is an important link in a trophic cascade often observed along the west coast of North America in which sea otter predation influences urchin abundance, which in turn influences kelp devastation. In contrast to their negatively perceived impact on community structure in open coastal kelp beds, the sedentary behavior and capture of detrital seaweed in the San Juan Islands is hypothesized to create an important habitat and energy source below the photic zone. These diverse ecosystem effects of red urchins highlight their importance as ecosystem engineers in temperate rocky reef ecosystems.

Spawning peaks between June and September. Eggs are fertilized externally while they float in the ocean, and planktonic larvae remain in the water column for about a month before settling on the bottom of the sea floor, where they undergo metamorphosis into juvenile urchins. These juveniles use chemical cues to locate adults. Although juveniles are found almost exclusively under aggregated adults, the adults and juveniles are not directly related.

== Effects of overpopulation ==
Since 2014, Red Sea Urchin populations have increased drastically in many areas along the pacific coast of North America. This is mainly due to them having very few natural predators, and with a decreasing population of Sea Otters and sunflower sea stars, their main predators can no longer keep their populations in check. While having a limited amount of sea urchins is beneficial in reducing overgrowth of kelp forests which can block out light and nutrients from reaching corals, too many urchins can result in a complete loss of kelp. Sea urchins mainly eat kelp forests, which many organisms rely on to survive. When Red Sea Urchin populations increase, entire kelp forests can be consumed. This leads to loss of food and shelter, resulting in a sharp decrease of biodiversity in that area. The loss of kelp forests can also impact fisheries. Without food or shelter, fish populations move to new areas or die off, which makes affected areas impossible to fish. Because this is so detrimental, humans have started working on ways to reduce populations. Culling and predator restoration are among the most successful of the methods.

Culling works by physically removing urchins one by one. This method is useful for small areas of high density, but is difficult to scale. While it is an easy method to execute, it is difficult to cull large areas. A much better method is to reintroduce their main predators to the affected areas. Sea Otters and Sunflower Sea Stars are the main predators of Red Sea Urchins, but many of them have been forced out. Sea Star wasting disease wiped out many of the Sunflower Sea Stars in key areas, and over-hunting in California decimated Otter populations. Projects have been conducted with the goal of restoring habitats for predators and physically bringing animals into affected areas. Bringing these predators back has been proven to be beneficial, reducing the amount of urchins and increasing biodiversity in many areas along the West Coast.
