= Trigonocidaridae =

Scientific classification
- Kingdom: Animalia
- Phylum: Echinodermata
- Class: Echinoidea
- Order: Camarodonta
- Family: Trigonocidaridae; Mortensen, 1903

Family of sea urchins

Trigonocidaridae is a family of echinoderms belonging to the order Camarodonta.

== Genera ==
Genera:

- Arbacina Pomel, 1869
- Asterechinus Mortensen, 1942
- Brochopleurus
