= Camarodonta =

Camarodonta Temporal range: Early Cretaceous–Present
- Paracentrotus lividus

Scientific classification
- Kingdom: Animalia
- Phylum: Echinodermata
- Class: Echinoidea
- Superorder: Echinacea
- Order: Camarodonta; Jackson, 1912

Families
- See text

Order of sea urchins

The Camarodonta are an order of globular sea urchins in the class Echinoidea. The fossil record shows that camarodonts have been in existence since the Lower Cretaceous.

== Characteristics ==
All camarodonts have imperforate tubercles and compound ambulacral plates with the lowest elements enlarged. The pores are at regular intervals along the ambulacral plates from the apex to the mouth opening or peristome. The Aristotle's lantern, or jaw system, has keeled teeth with the supports meeting above the "foramen magnum".

== Families ==
According to World Register of Marine Species:

- Infraorder Echinidea (Kroh & Smith, 2010)
  - Family Echinidae (Gray, 1825)
  - Superfamily Odontophora (Kroh & Smith, 2010)
    - Family Echinometridae (Gray, 1855)
    - Family Strongylocentrotidae (Gregory, 1900)
    - Family Toxopneustidae (Troschel, 1872)
  - Family Parechinidae (Mortensen, 1903b)
- Family Parasaleniidae (Mortensen, 1903b)
- Infraorder Temnopleuridea (Kroh & Smith, 2010)
  - Family Temnopleuridae (A. Agassiz, 1872)
  - Family Trigonocidaridae (Mortensen, 1903b)
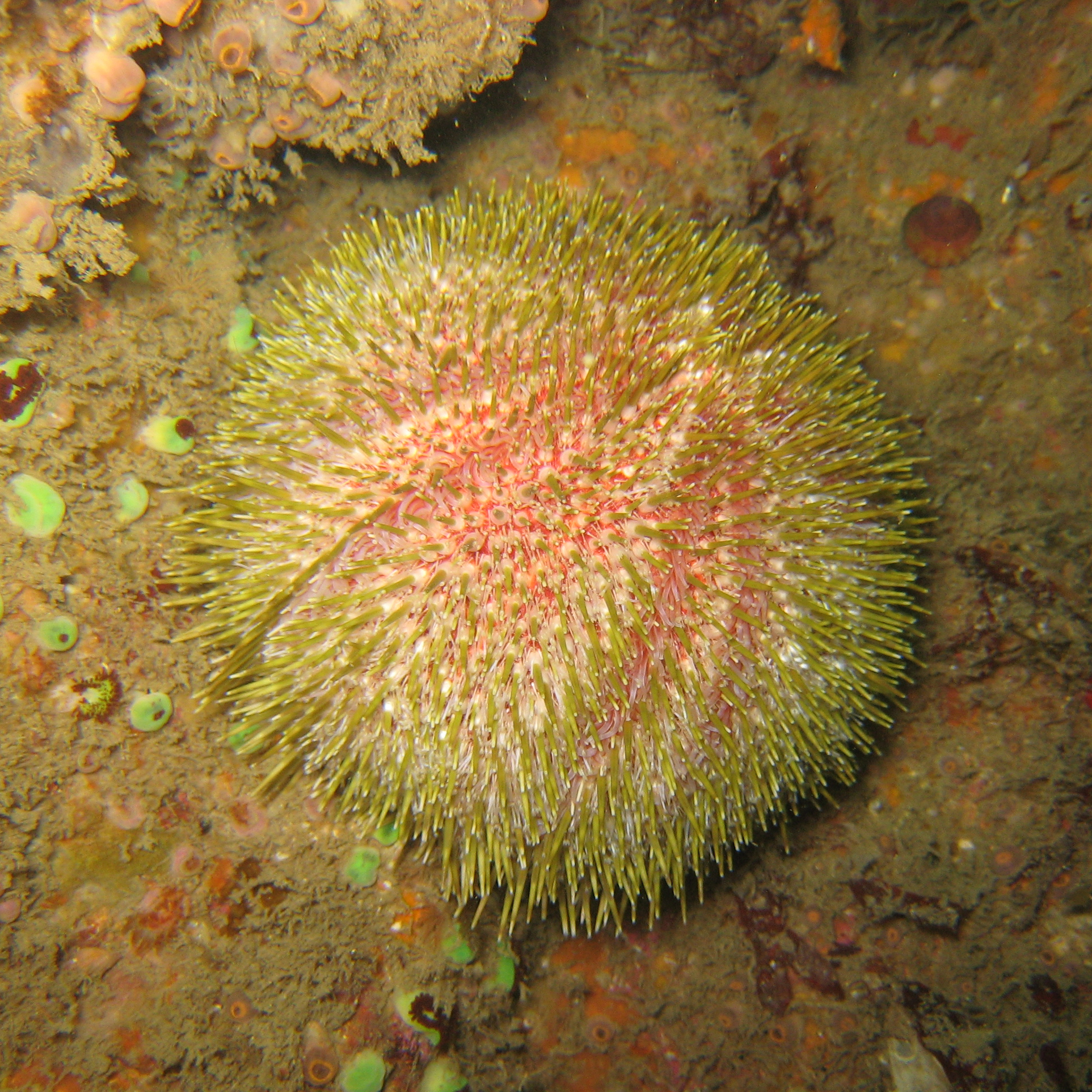
Echinus esculentus, Echinidae

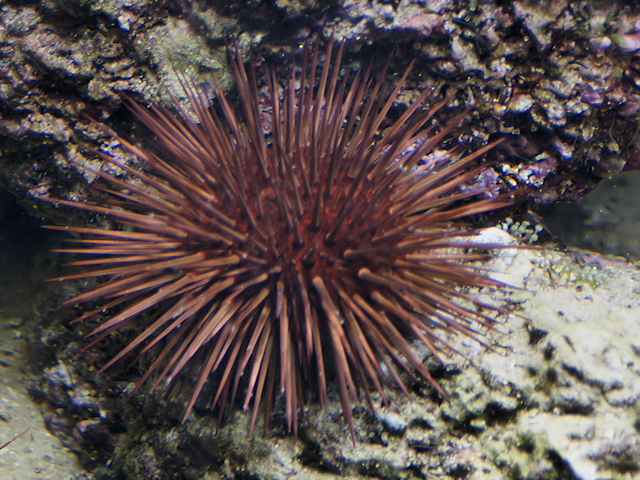
Echinometra lucunter, Echinometridae

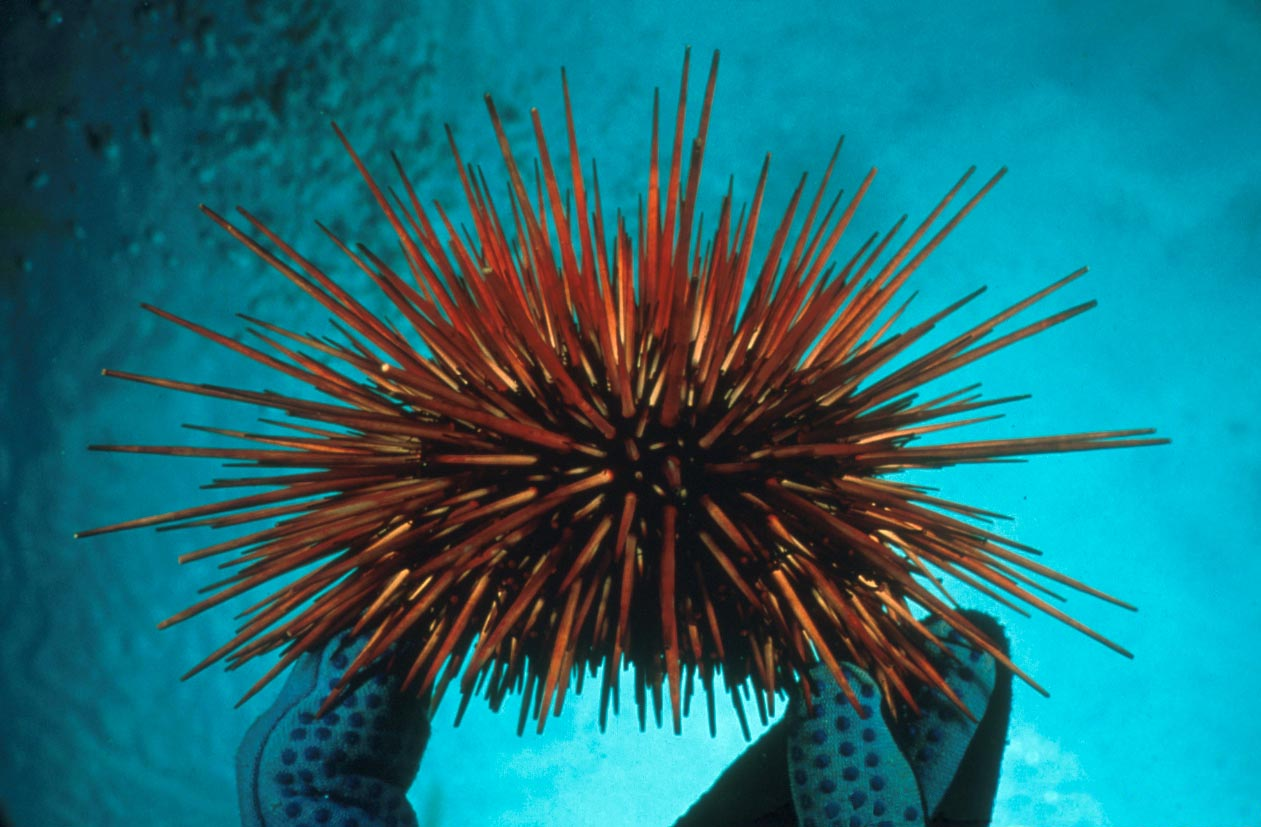
Strongylocentrotus franciscanus, Strongylocentrotidae

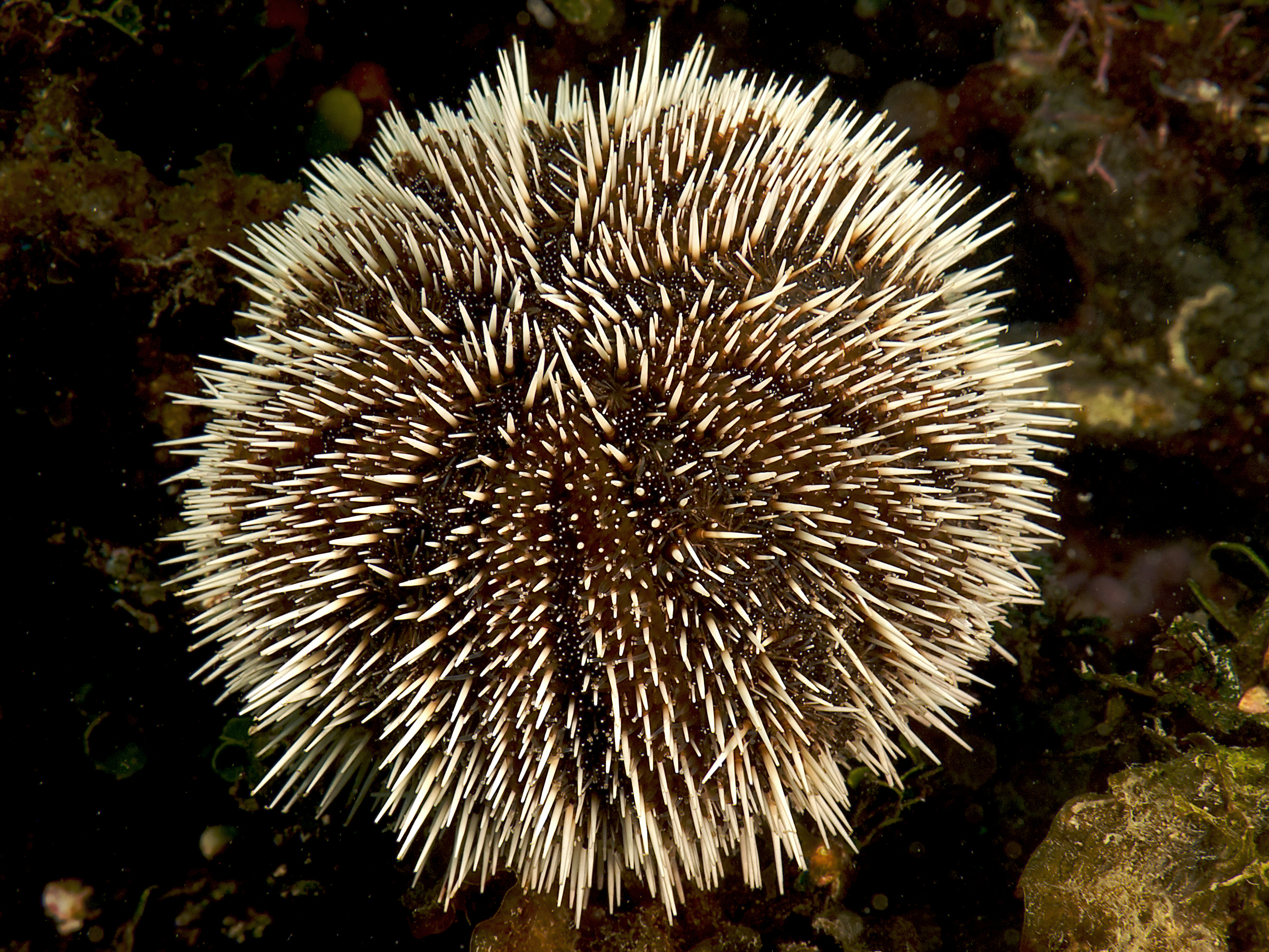
Tripneustes ventricosus, Toxopneustidae

Paracentrotus lividus, Parechinidae

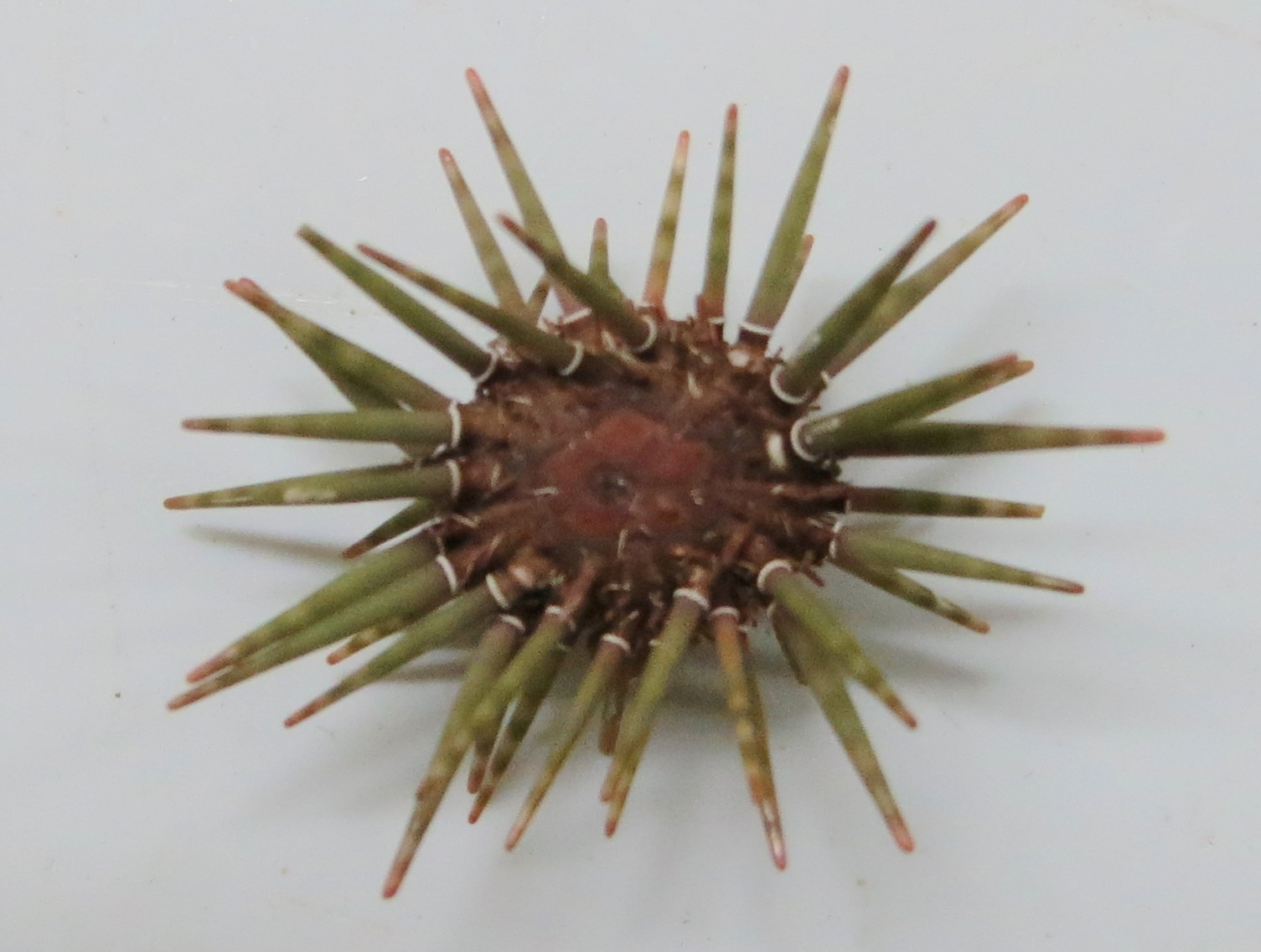
Parasalenia poehlii, Parasaleniidae

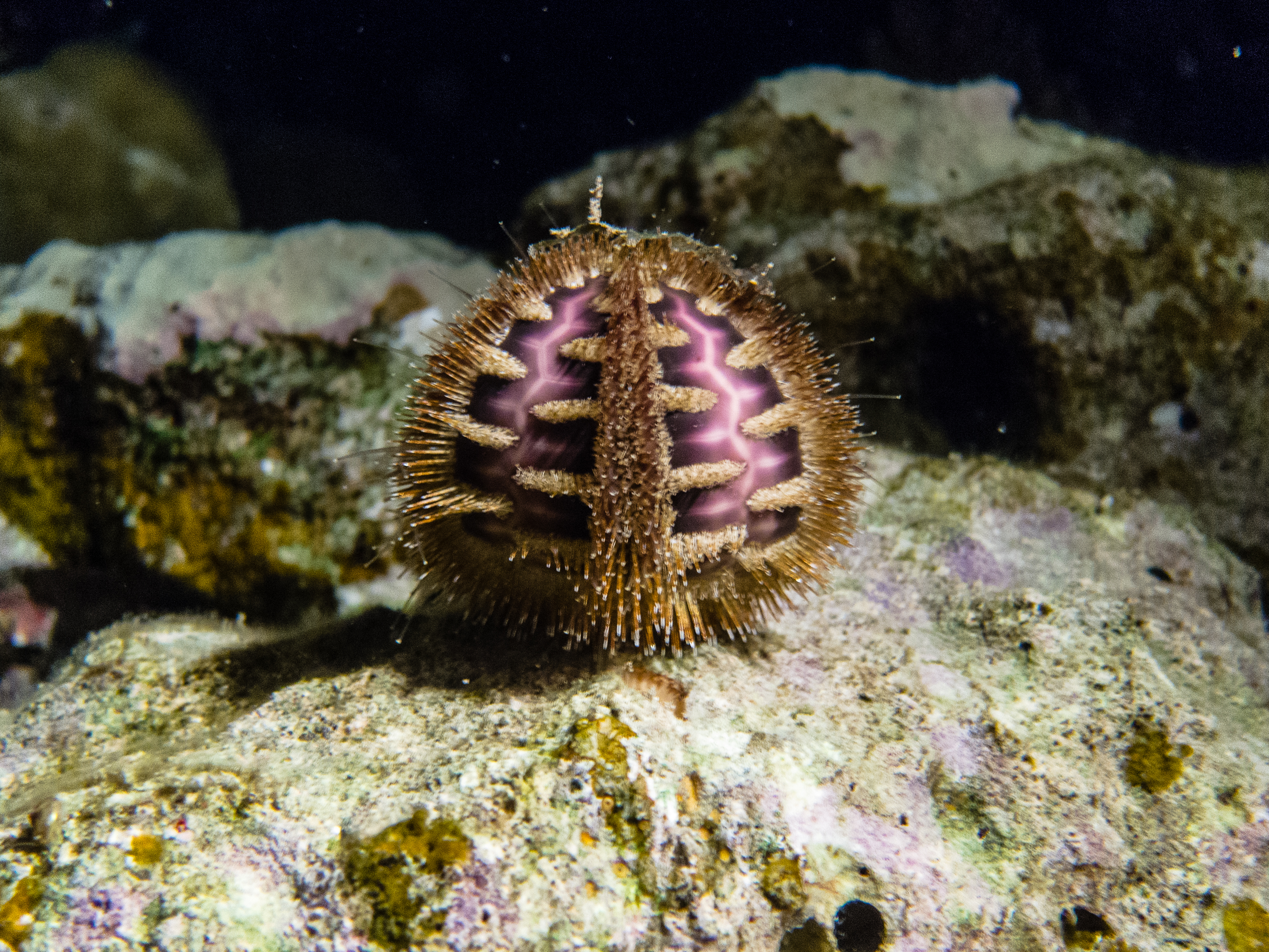
Microcyphus rousseaui, Temnopleuridae

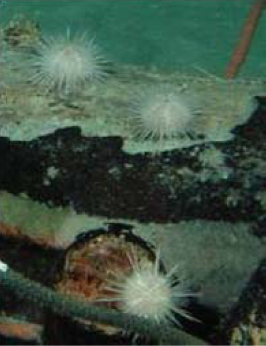
Asterechinus elegans, Trigonocidaridae
