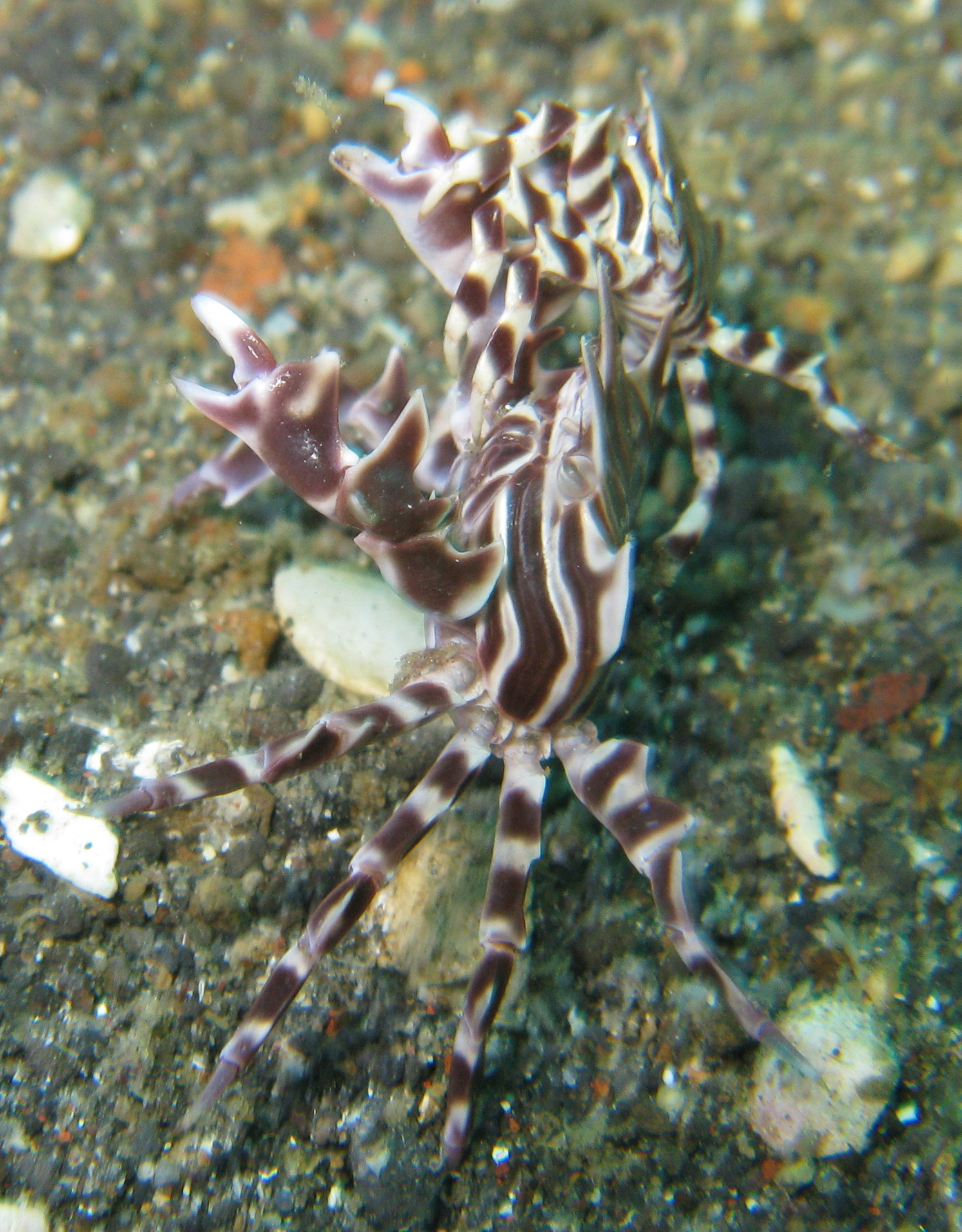

Scientific classification
- Domain: Eukaryota
- Kingdom: Animalia
- Phylum: Arthropoda
- Class: Malacostraca
- Order: Decapoda
- Suborder: Pleocyemata
- Infraorder: Brachyura
- Superfamily: Pilumnoidea
- Family: Pilumnidae
- Subfamily: Eumedoninae
- Genus: Zebrida
- Species: Z. adamsii

Binomial name
- Zebrida adamsii White, 1847

Synonyms
- Acanthonyx zebrida Wood, 1867; Zebrida paucidentata Flipse, 1930

= Zebrida adamsii =

Species of crab

Zebrida adamsii is a distinctively striped species of crab that lives in association with a sea urchin in the Indo-Pacific region. It is cryptically coloured with vertical stripes and has special adaptations to its legs to enable it to cling to its host's spines.

== Description ==
Z. adamsii is a small crab, described as "a torpid, though elegant little crustacean" by the English naturalist Arthur Adams when it was first discovered by him and the Scottish zoologist Adam White during the surveying voyage of HMS Samarang in the Far East between 1843 and 1846. The carapace and limbs are smooth and hairless and are adorned with long spines. The colour is pink with dark, reddish-brown vertical stripes.

== Distribution ==
Z. adamsii has a wide distribution in shallow water in the tropical Indian Ocean and western Pacific Ocean. The type locality is the estuary of the Pantai River in Borneo at a depth of about 35 ft (11 m).

== Ecology ==
Z. adamsii lives in symbiosis with a sea urchin, living among its spines. Sea urchins on which it has been found include Asthenosoma ijimai, Diadema setosum, Heliocidaris crassispina, Pseudocentrotus depressus, Salmacis bicolor, Salmacis virgulata, Toxopneustes elegans, Toxopneustes pileolus, Tripneustes gratilla and a species of Acanthocidaris. Adaptations for this lifestyle include a specialist joint between the propodus and dactylus on the walking legs enabling the crab to cling to its host, and cryptic colouring in the form of vertical stripes. Females are slightly larger than males and usually live singly on a sea urchin while males move from one urchin to another searching for females.

Z. adamsii feeds on its host's tube feet and on the epidermal tissue covering the test and the base of the spines. This does little harm to the host which readily regenerates both the tissue and the tube feet.

Z. adamsii larvae are planktonic and pass through four zoeal stages, and one megalopa stage before settling on the seabed and undergoing metamorphosis into juvenile crabs.
