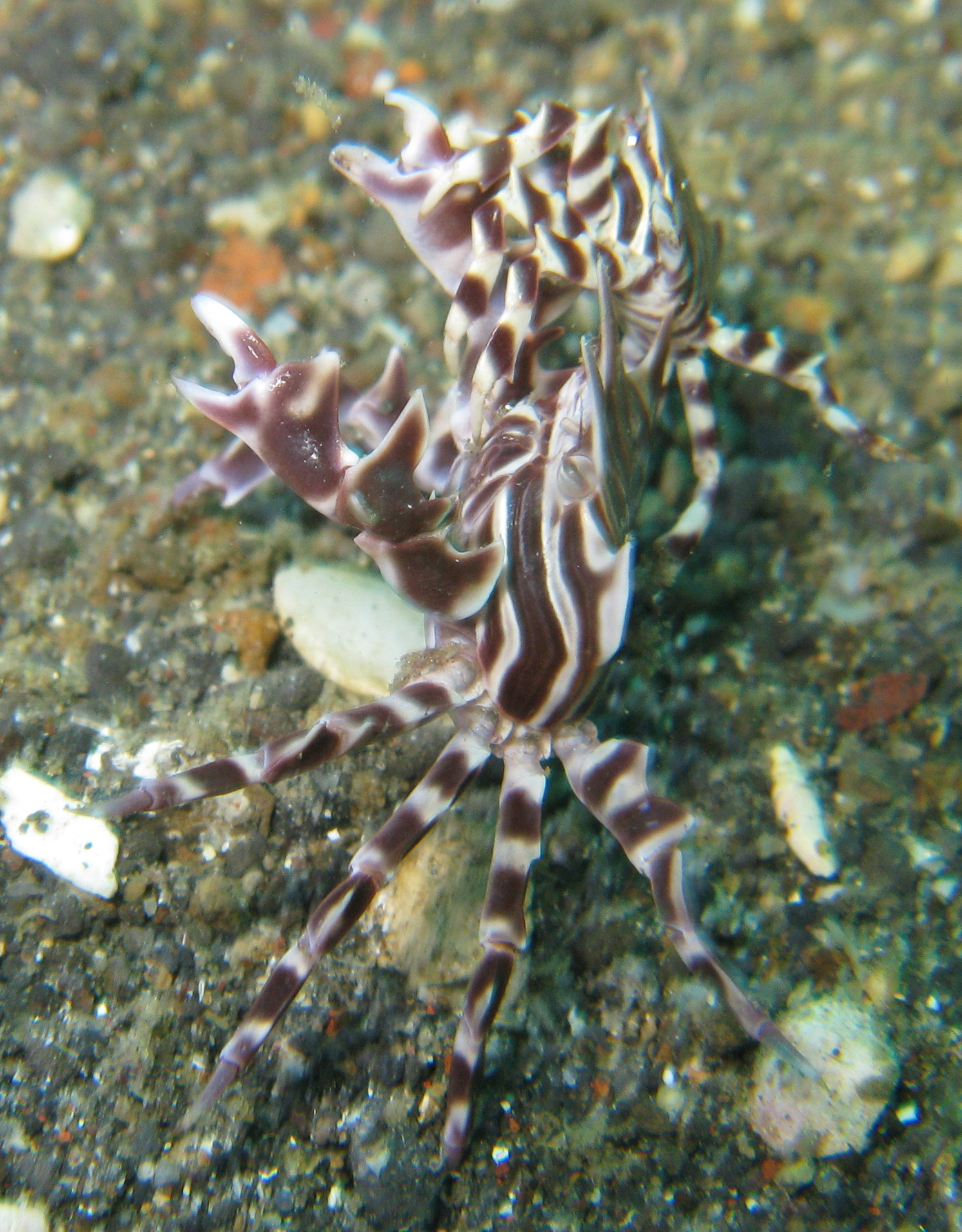
- Zebrida adamsii

Scientific classification
- Domain: Eukaryota
- Kingdom: Animalia
- Phylum: Arthropoda
- Class: Malacostraca
- Order: Decapoda
- Suborder: Pleocyemata
- Infraorder: Brachyura
- Family: Pilumnidae
- Subfamily: Eumedoninae
- Genus: Zebrida; White, 1847

Species
- Z. adamsii White, 1847; Z. brevicarinata Ng & D. G. B. Chia, 1999; Z. longispina Haswell, 1880

= Zebrida =

Genus of crabs

Zebrida is a small genus of distinctive striped crabs, known as zebra crabs, that live in association with sea urchins in the Indo-Pacific.

== Description ==
Zebrida was described by Arthur Adams as "a torpid, though elegant little crustacean". It is "the most unusual" of the genera in the subfamily Eumedoninae, with long spines projecting from the body, and a distinctive pattern of stripes across the exoskeleton.

== Taxonomy and distribution ==
The genus was thought to be monotypic for a long time, but in 1999, Peter Ng & Diana Chia recognised two additional species, bringing the total number to three.

- Zebrida adamsii is widespread in the Indian Ocean and western Pacific Ocean, from Japan to Australia.
- Zebrida brevicarinata is only known from Western Australia.
- Zebrida longispina is only known from Western Australia.

== Ecology and life cycle ==
Crabs of the genus Zebrida live, often in pairs, in association with sea urchins, including Toxopneustes pileolus, Toxopneustes elegans, Tripneustes gratilla, Diadema setosum, Asthenosoma ijimai, Salmacis bicolor, Salmacis virgulata, Heliocidaris crassispina, Pseudocentrotus depressus and a species of Acanthocidaris.

Z. adamsii passes through four zoeal phases, and one megalopa phase before reaching the mature condition.
