= Flower urchins =

Flower urchins may refer to:

- Toxopneustes pileolus, a venomous species of sea urchin from the tropical Indo-West Pacific
- Members of the genus Toxopneustes in general
