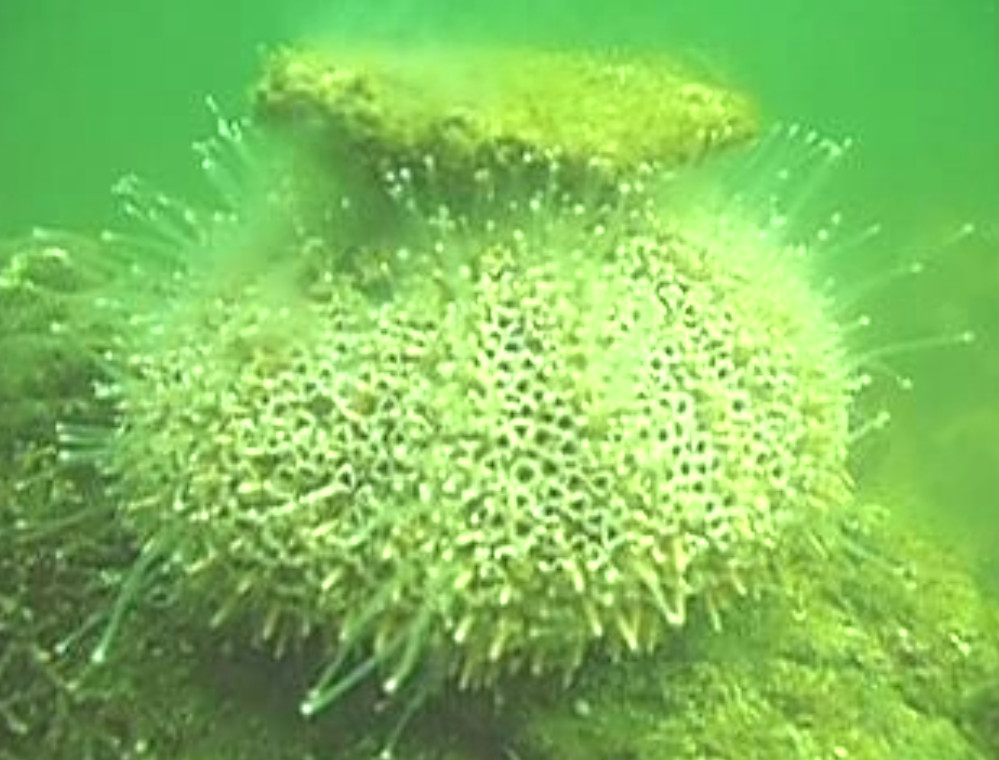
- Male Toxopneustes roseus from the Gulf of California releasing milt (see video here). The object on top of the animal is a piece of coral rubble.

Scientific classification
- Domain: Eukaryota
- Kingdom: Animalia
- Phylum: Echinodermata
- Class: Echinoidea
- Order: Camarodonta
- Family: Toxopneustidae
- Genus: Toxopneustes
- Species: T. roseus

Binomial name
- Toxopneustes roseus (A. Agassiz, 1863)
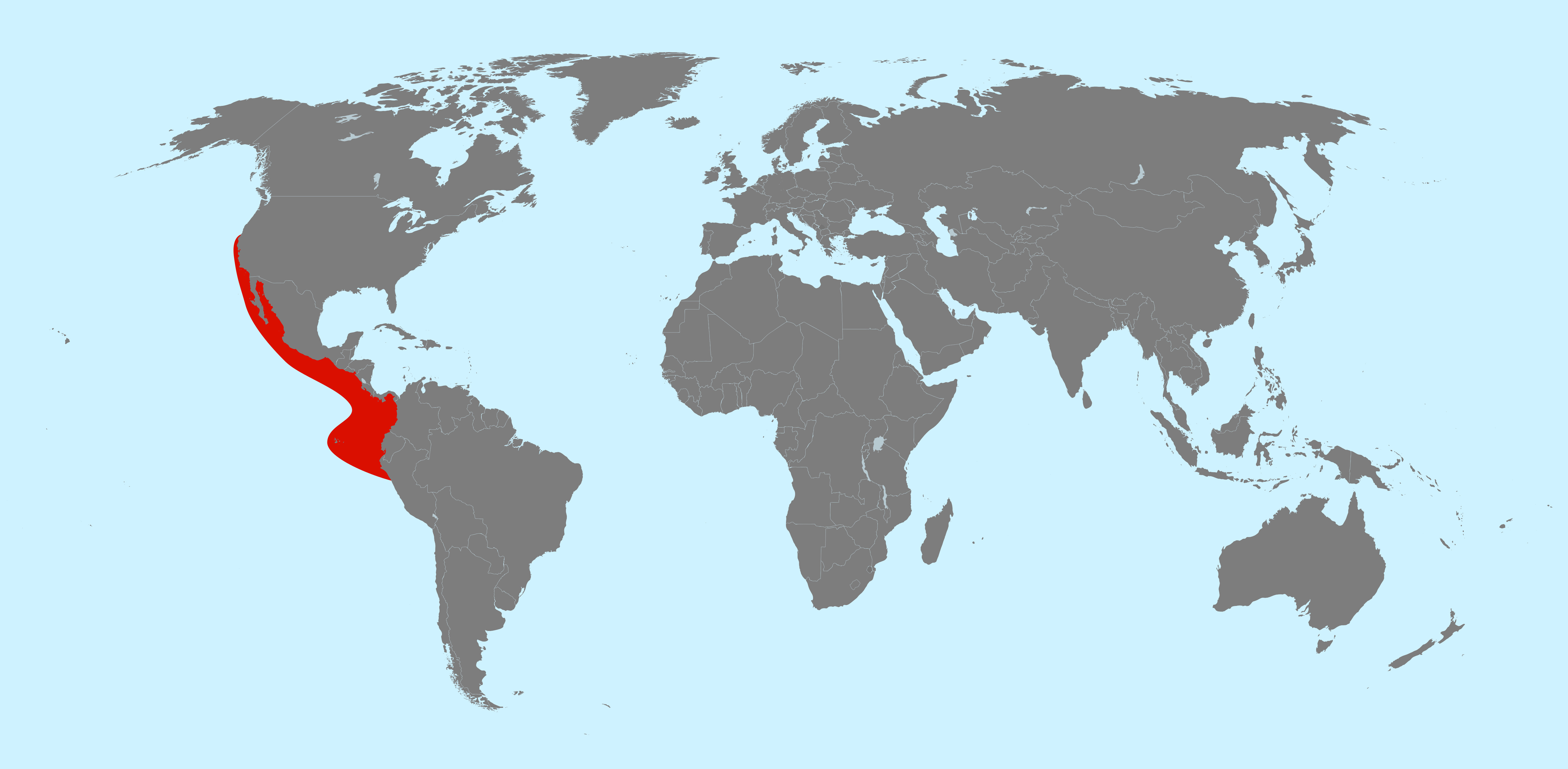
- Estimated range

Synonyms
- Boletia picta Verrill, 1871; Boletia roseus A. Agassiz, 1863; Lytechinus roseus (A. Agassiz, 1863)

= Toxopneustes roseus =

Species of sea urchin

Toxopneustes roseus is a species of sea urchin from the East Pacific. It is sometimes known as the rose flower urchin or the pink flower urchin. Like the related flower urchin, they are venomous.

== Taxonomy ==
Toxopneustes roseus is one of the four species in the genus Toxopneustes. It was first described by the American zoologist Alexander Emanuel Agassiz in 1863 as Boletia roseus.

The generic name Toxopneustes literally means "poison breath", derived from Greek τοξικόν [φάρμακον] (toksikón [phármakon], "arrow [poison]") and πνευστος (pneustos, "breath"). The specific name roseus means "rosy" in Latin.

Though it does not have a widely used common name, it is sometimes known as the "rose flower urchin" or the "pink flower urchin". More commonly, it is simply called a "flower urchin", though that name strictly applies only to the related Indo-West Pacific species, Toxopneustes pileolus.

== Description ==
Toxopneustes roseus is similar in appearance to the more widespread flower urchin, Toxopneustes pileolus. It can be distinguished by having a rigid "shell" (test) that is a solid pink, red, or purple in color, in contrast to the variegated coloration of the test of Toxopneustes pileolus. Like other members of the genus, its most conspicuous feature are its numerous pedicellariae (stalked grasping appendages) which gives it the appearance of being a cluster of flowers.

== Distribution ==
Toxopneustes roseus is the only member of the genus found in the East Pacific. It can be found from Peru, up along the coast of Central America (including the Gulf of California), and as far north as California. They can also be found in the waters around the Galapagos Islands.

They are common in coral reefs, rhodolith beds, and rocky environments, at depths of 2 to 50 m (7 to 164 ft). They can also be found in sand and mud substrates.

== Ecology ==
Toxopneustes roseus feeds almost exclusively on rhodoliths, a coralline algae. They are highly mobile. They move and feed throughout the day and night, though they seem to be more active at night.

Toxopneustes roseus are among the numerous species of sea urchins known as "collector urchins", so named because they frequently cover the upper surfaces of their bodies with debris from their surroundings. This behavior is usually referred to as "covering" or "heaping". A 1998 study has postulated that the debris collected by the sea urchins may serve as ballast, preventing them from being swept away by wave surges when feeding

== Venom ==
Like other members of the genus, Toxopneustes roseus is venomous. The flower-like pedicellariae can deliver a painful sting if touched.
