= Zebrida longispina =

Scientific classification
- Kingdom: Animalia
- Phylum: Arthropoda
- Class: Malacostraca
- Order: Decapoda
- Suborder: Pleocyemata
- Infraorder: Brachyura
- Family: Pilumnidae
- Genus: Zebrida
- Species: Z. longispina

Binomial name
- Zebrida longispina Haswell, 1880

Species of crustacean

Zebrida longispina is a species of decapod in the family Pilumnidae.
