= Zebrida brevicarinata =

Scientific classification
- Kingdom: Animalia
- Phylum: Arthropoda
- Class: Malacostraca
- Order: Decapoda
- Suborder: Pleocyemata
- Infraorder: Brachyura
- Family: Pilumnidae
- Genus: Zebrida
- Species: Z. brevicarinata

Binomial name
- Zebrida brevicarinata Ng & D.G.B.Chia, 1999

Species of crustacean

Zebrida brevicarinata is a species of decapod in the family Pilumnidae.
