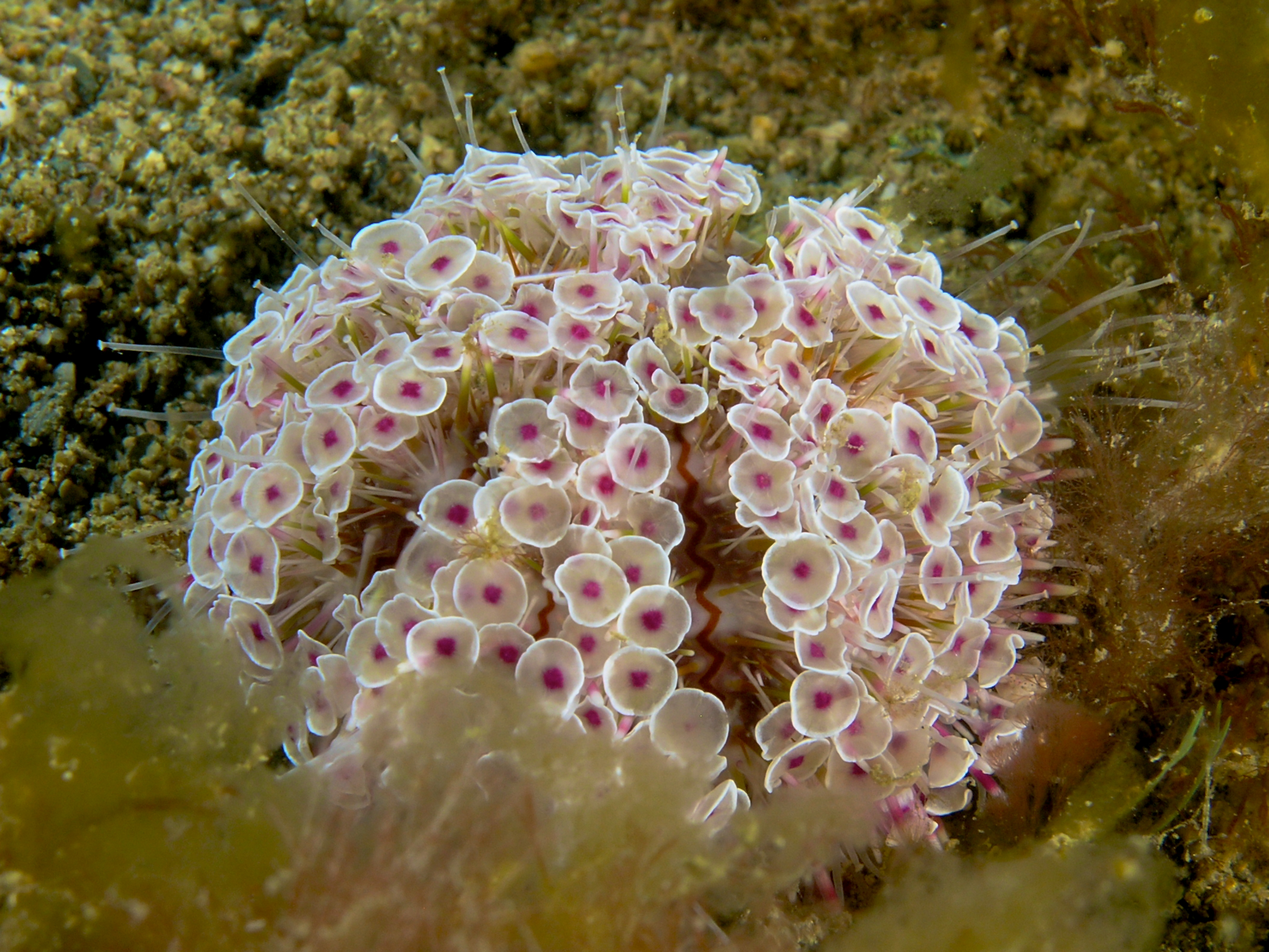
- The flower urchin (Toxopneustes pileolus) is potentially dangerous to humans

Scientific classification
- Kingdom: Animalia
- Phylum: Echinodermata
- Class: Echinoidea
- Order: Camarodonta
- Family: Toxopneustidae
- Genus: Toxopneustes; L. Agassiz, 1841

Type species
- Echinus pileolus Lamarck, 1816

Synonyms
- Boletia L. Agassiz, 1841

= Toxopneustes =

Toxopneustes Temporal range: Pliocene–Recent

Genus of sea urchins

Toxopneustes is a genus of sea urchins from the tropical Indo-Pacific. It contains four species. They are known to possess medically significant venom to humans on their pedicellariae (tiny claw-like structures). They are sometimes collectively known as flower urchins, after the most widespread and most commonly encountered species in the genus, the flower urchin (Toxopneustes pileolus).

== Species ==
Species included in the genus are the following:

Image	Scientific name	Description	Distribution
	Toxopneustes elegans Döderlein, 1885	Can be distinguished by the presence of a distinctive dark stripe just below the tips of their spines.	Restricted to waters around Japan.
	Toxopneustes maculatus (Lamarck, 1816)	Can be distinguished by bright violet coloration on the bottom and in a band around the middle of their tests.	Very rare species found in the Indo-West Pacific. Known only from specimens from Réunion, Christmas Island, and the Palmyra Atoll.
	Toxopneustes pileolus (Lamarck, 1816)	Can be distinguished by variegated red, grey, green, or purple coloration of their tests.	Common and widespread in the Indo-West Pacific, from East Africa to the Cook Islands.
	Toxopneustes roseus (A. Agassiz, 1863)	Can be distinguished by the uniform coloration of their tests of pink, brown, or purple.	Restricted to the East Pacific, along the coasts of California, Mexico, Central America, and part of South America (including the Galapagos Islands).

== Gallery ==
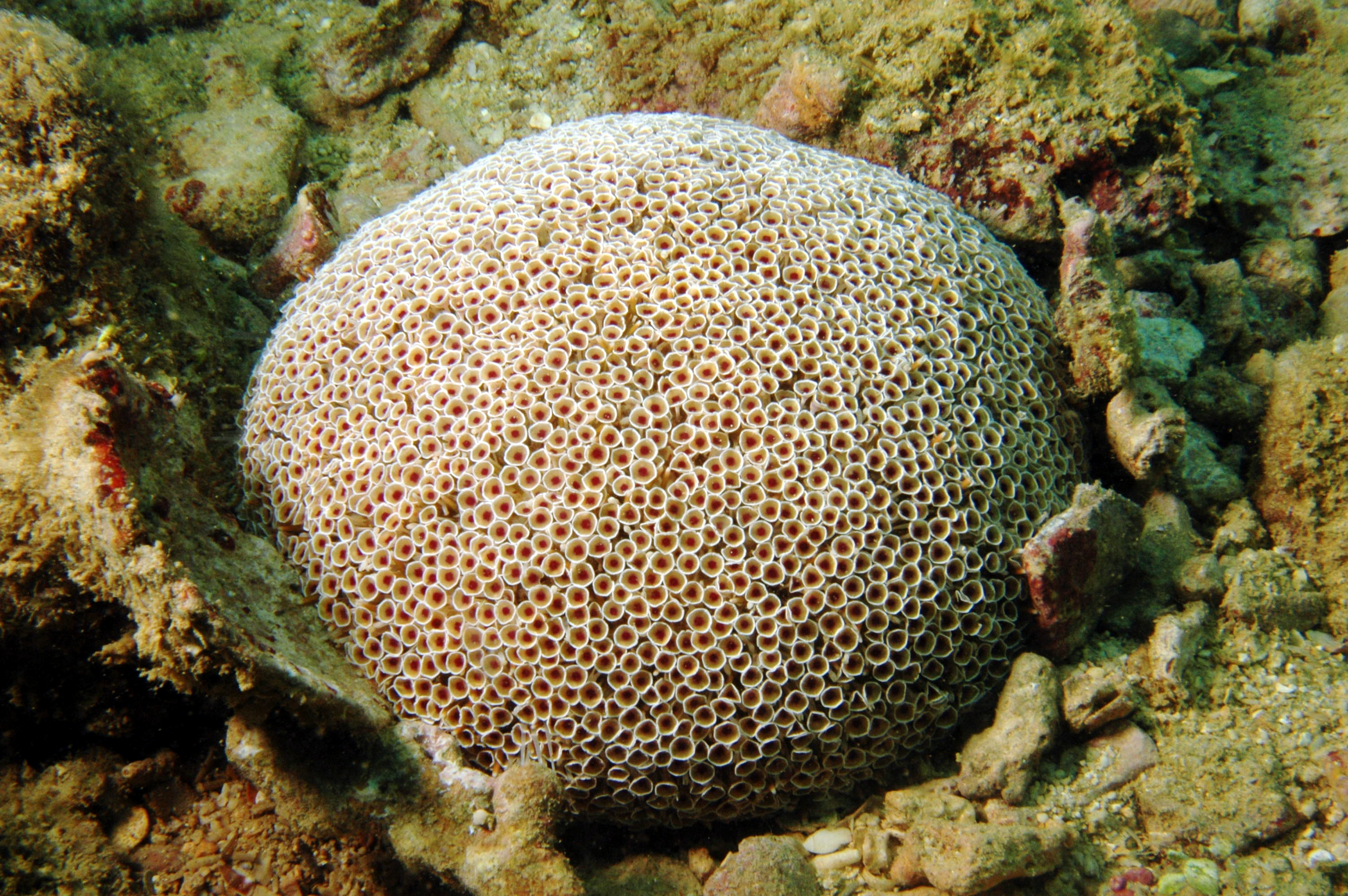
Toxopneustes pileolus from Okinawa, Japan

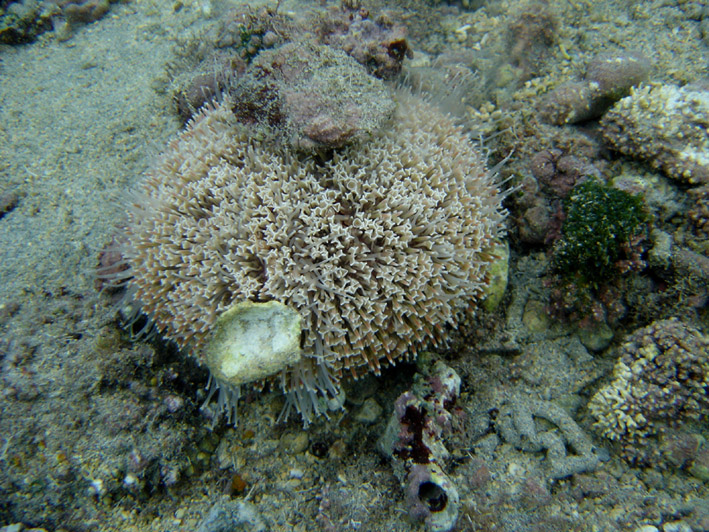
Toxopneustes pileolus from Réunion

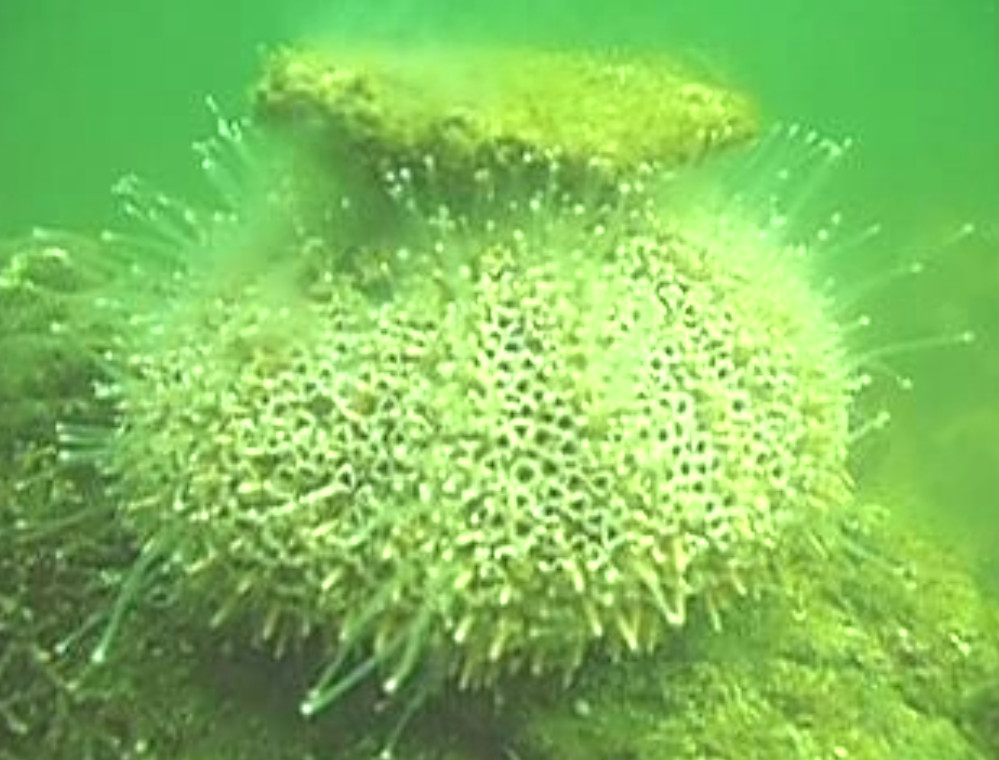
Toxopneustes roseus from the Gulf of California, Mexico
