= Sea urchin injury =

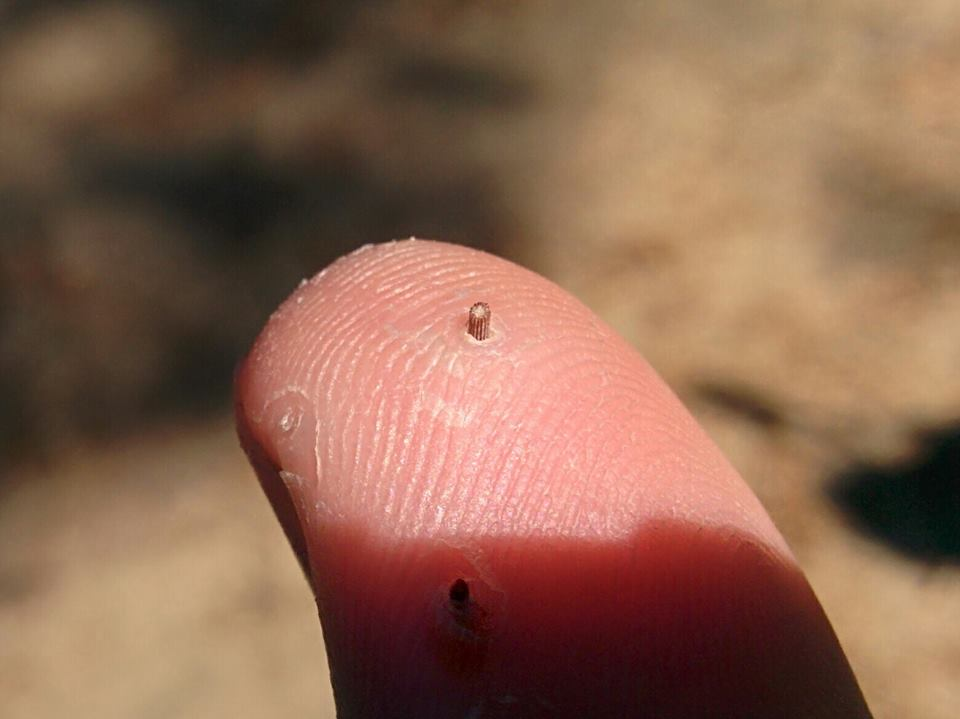
- Sea urchin injury leaving spine fragments in the foot and ankle (above) and finger (below).
- Specialty: Emergency medicine
- Treatment: Removal of spines, hot water soaks

Sea urchin injuries are caused by contact with sea urchins, and are characterized by puncture wounds inflicted by the animal's brittle, fragile spines. Injuries usually occur when swimmers, divers, surfers, or fishers accidentally touch or step on them.

Immediate symptoms of sea urchin injuries include pain, bleeding, redness, swelling, and inflammation. Leaving spine fragments in the body may lead to chronic discomfort, tenosynovitis, and arthritis.

== Signs and symptoms ==
Most signs and symptoms of sea urchin injury result from local trauma and inflammatory reactions to spine fragments. They are made of calcium carbonate, making them very brittle and easy to break off in the body.

Symptoms of the initial injury may include pain, bleeding, redness, swelling, and inflammation. The injury may show small purple or black dots or staining of the skin from the natural dye inside the sea urchin. These symptoms generally subside with complete removal of the spines.

About 80 of the 600 unique species of sea urchins contain poisons, but they generally do not cause significant harm to humans. However, an allergic reaction or large enough dose of the toxins (such as puncture by > 15-20 spines) may lead to systemic effects such as nausea, vomiting, paraesthesia, generalized weakness, and respiratory distress. The most notable species is the flower urchin, which is common in the tropical Indo-West Pacific. There are reports of accidental drowning due to the muscular paralysis, numbness, and disorientation caused by puncture from a flower urchin, but they remain difficult to confirm.

Leaving spine fragments in the body may lead to chronic effects, even if the initial local and systemic symptoms reside. The most common long-term complications include discomfort, tenosynovitis, and arthritis.

== Pathophysiology ==
Following injury by a non-venomous sea urchin, the spine can stay for a while inside the flesh, causing pain and discomfort. Spines not dissolved or expelled from the body may eventually be surrounded by a granuloma, a normal inflammatory reaction that forms a nodule around foreign bodies. Granuloma formation and associated symptoms may not present until several months after the initial injury. Granulomas that happen to form near or within tendons, joints, or muscles may obstruct normal function of those structures, leading to chronic discomfort, movement deficits, or local inflammation. Surgical removal of the spine and granuloma often relieves the symptoms.

== Treatment ==
Embedded spines can often be removed with tweezers with no long-term consequences, but their brittle nature often leaves fragments within the body. Hot water soaks are thought to destroy toxins, alleviate pain, and help dissolve any remnants of the spines.

Other common remedies include salicylic acid paste, hot candle wax, vinegar, and urine, but evidence of their benefit remains unclear. Small fragments too deep to remove with tweezers are often left alone, as they are known to either extrude through the skin or dissolve over time. Injuries that continue to cause pain or discomfort, show signs of infection, or are associated with nerve or joint injury should be evaluated by a medical professional. X-ray or MRI may be used to visualize deep spines and assess the need for surgical removal.

== See also ==
- Bristleworm sting
- List of cutaneous conditions
