= Umagillidae =

Scientific classification
- Kingdom: Animalia
- Phylum: Platyhelminthes
- Order: Rhabdocoela
- Infraorder: Neodalyellida
- Family: Umagillidae; Wahl, 1910

Family of flatworms

Umagillidae is a family of flatworms belonging to the order Rhabdocoela.

== Description ==
Umagillidae is the most species-rich taxon of symbiotic non-neodermatan flatworms. Umagillids are common endosymbionts of echinoderms, with few species also living inside sipunculids. They demonstrate a wide variety of feeding behaviors, ranging from endozoic predation of symbiotic protozoans to full endoparasitic feeding on its host's tissues. Most species, including species of Seritia and Wahlia are intestinal, while species of Anoplodium are confined to the coelomic regions of its host.

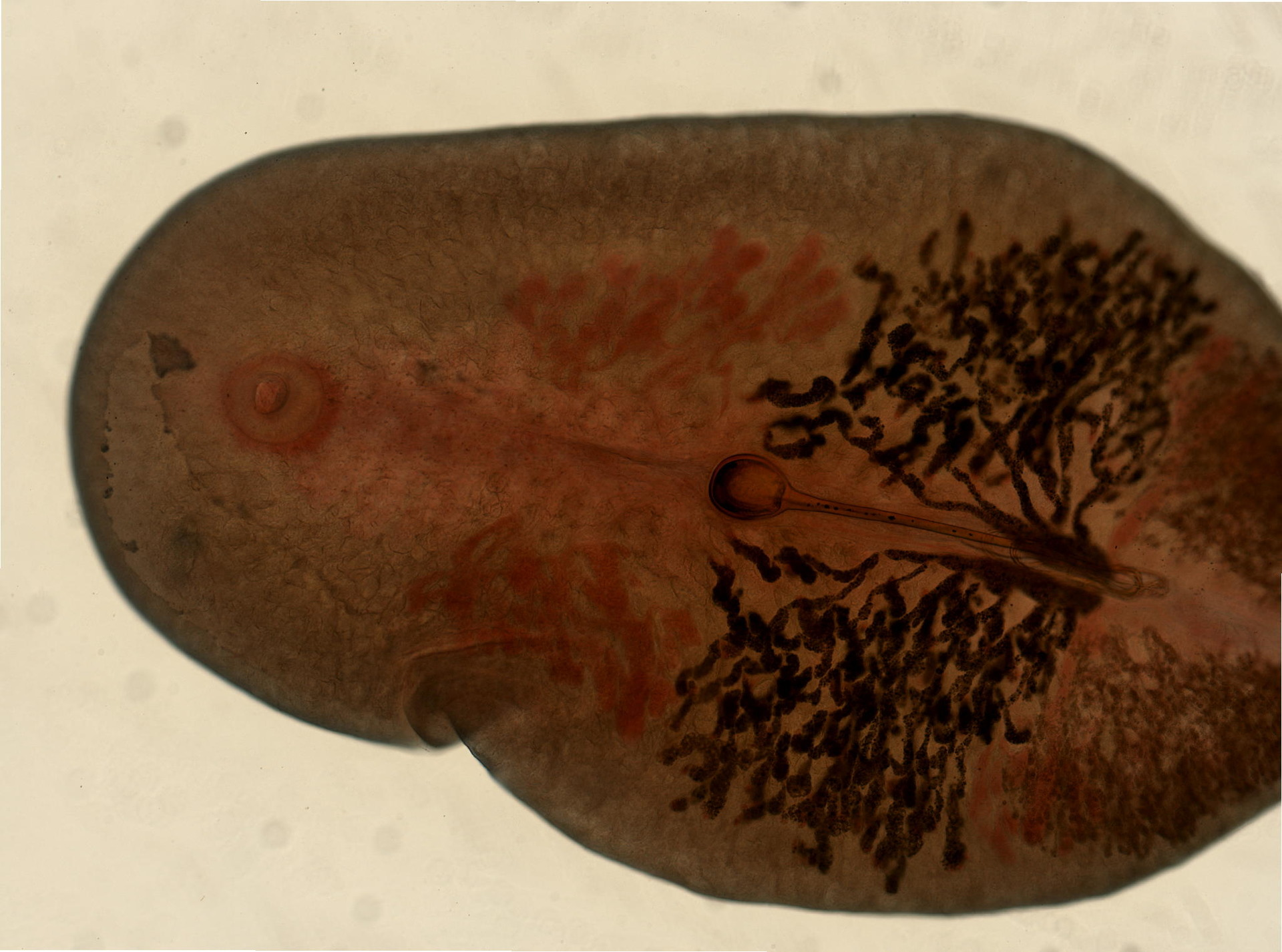
Syndesmis sp.

== Genera ==
=== Bicladinae ===
- Bicladus Kaburaki, 1925
- Desmote Beklemischev, 1916
- Fallacohospes Kozloff, 1965
- Parafallacohospes Shinn, 1987

=== Collastominae ===
- Collastoma Dörler, 1900

=== Umagillinae ===
- Anoplodiera Westblad, 1930
- Anoplodiopsis Westblad, 1953
- Anoplodium Schneider, 1858
- Cleistogamia Faust, 1924
- Macrogynium Meserve, 1934
- Marcusella Westblad, 1953
- Monticellina Westblad, 1953
- Notothrix Hickman, 1955
- Ozametra Marcus, 1949
- Paranotothrix Cannon, 1982
- Seretia Cannon, 1982
- Syndesmis Silliman, 1881
- Umagilla Wahl, 1909
- Wahlia Westblad, 1930

== Sources ==
This article incorporates text from a free content work. Licensed under CC-BY. Text taken from A Comprehensive Molecular Phylogeny of Dalytyphloplanida (Platyhelminthes: Rhabdocoela) Reveals Multiple Escapes from the Marine Environment and Origins of Symbiotic Relationships, Van Steenkiste et al, PLOS One.
