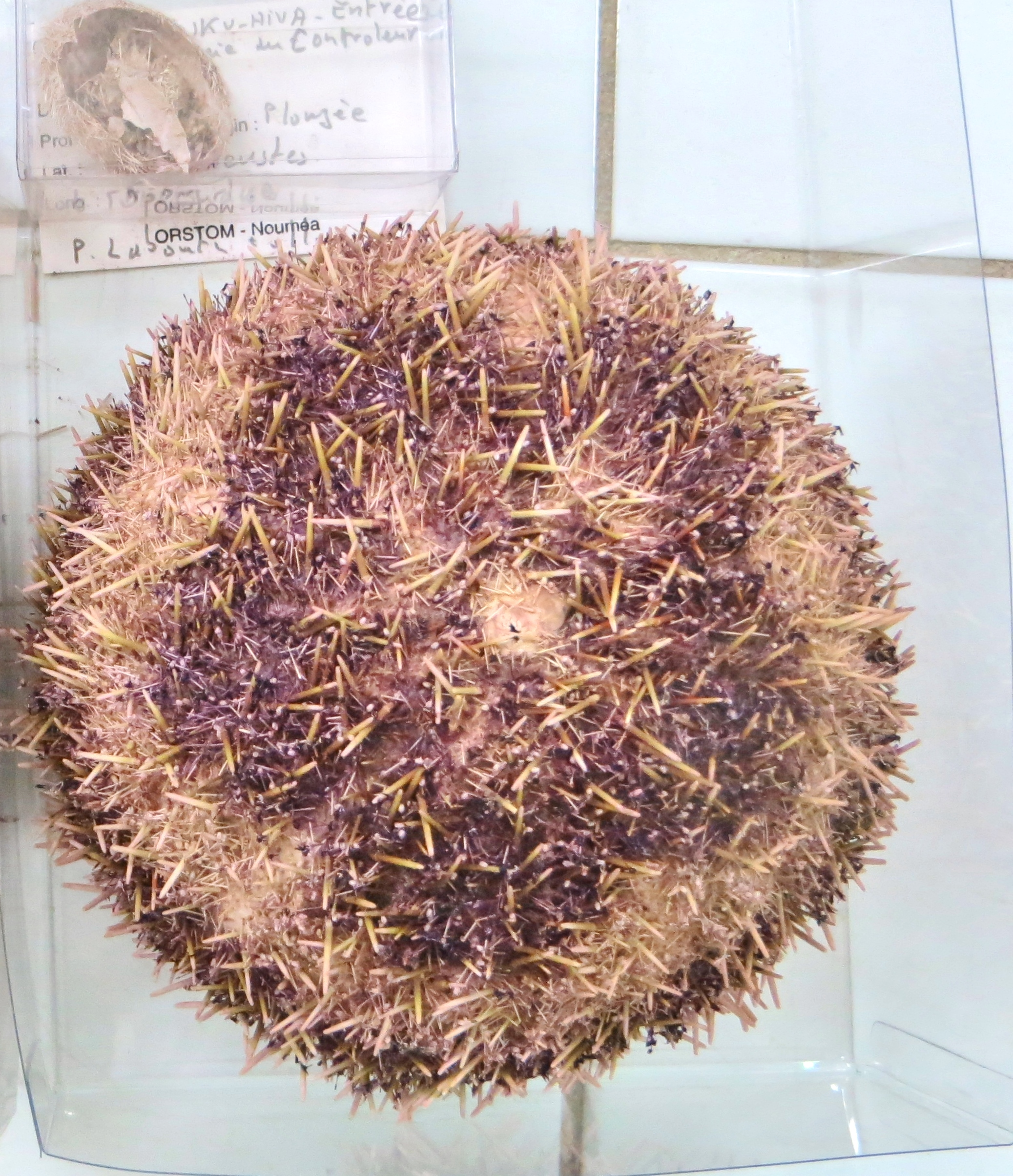
- In the MNHN collection

Scientific classification
- Kingdom: Animalia
- Phylum: Echinodermata
- Class: Echinoidea
- Order: Camarodonta
- Family: Toxopneustidae
- Genus: Toxopneustes
- Species: T. maculatus

Binomial name
- Toxopneustes maculatus (Lamarck, 1816)
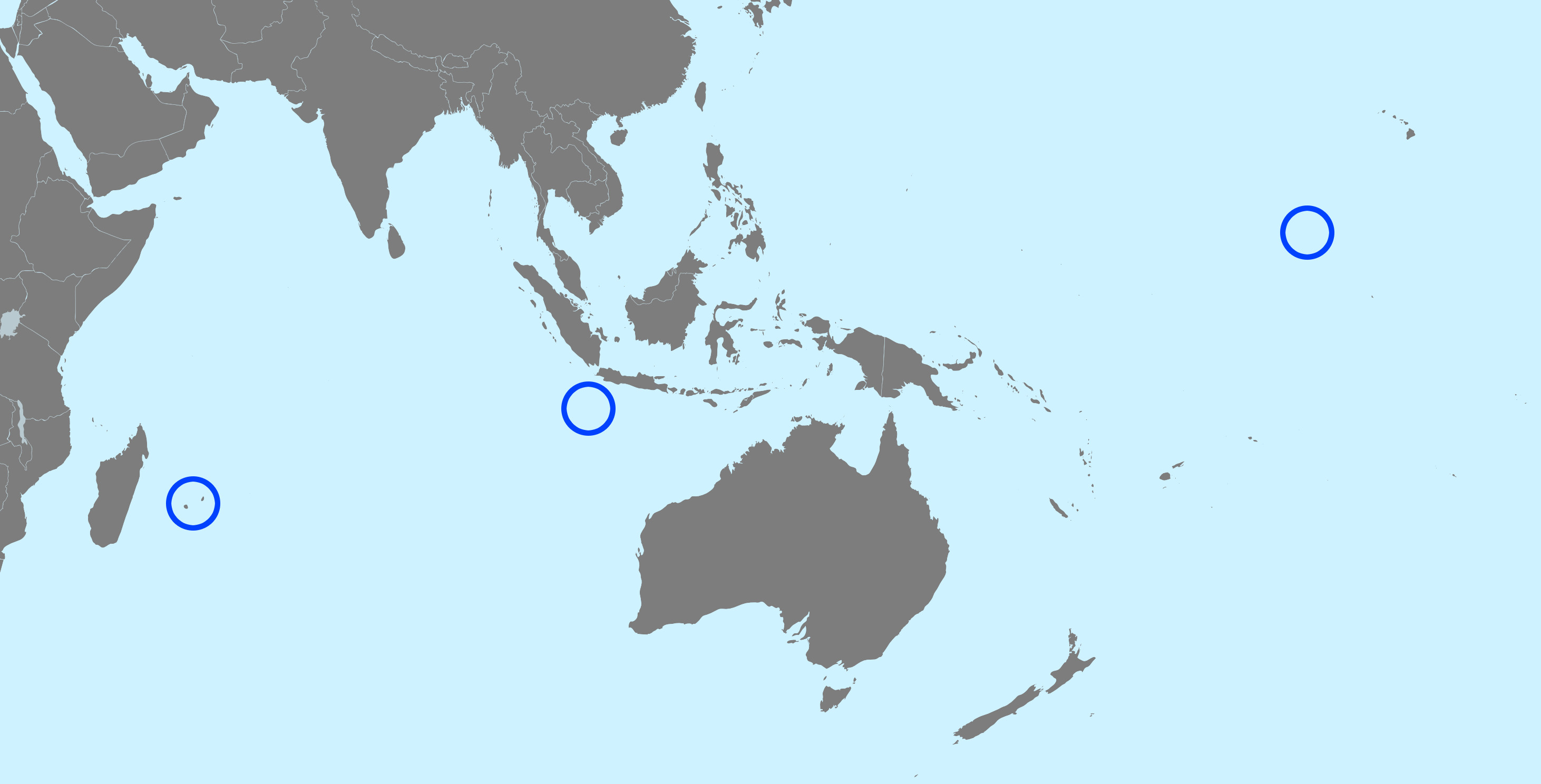
- Estimated range

Synonyms
- Boletia maculata (Lamarck, 1816); Echinus depressus Blainville, 1825; Echinus maculatus Lamarck, 1816

= Toxopneustes maculatus =

Species of sea urchin

Toxopneustes maculatus is a species of sea urchin in the family Toxopneustidae, known from the Marquesas Islands and Line Islands of the central Pacific Ocean. It is one of four species in the genus Toxopneustes, the flower urchins.

== Taxonomy ==
The species was described by Jean-Baptiste Lamarck in 1816 as Echinus maculatus; no figure accompanied the description. Alexander Agassiz transferred it to Toxopneustes in 1872. A syntype is held by the Muséum national d'histoire naturelle in Paris.

== Description ==
The test is low and flattened. Specimens in the British Museum measured 70–100 mm in diameter, with a height well under half the diameter. Because the tests of Toxopneustes species are structurally very similar, coloration is the main character used to separate them. T. maculatus is distinguished by a conspicuous purple blotch on the upper (aboral) surface and a bright blue-violet band around the ambitus. In one atypical specimen the whole upper surface was purple and the oral surface a lighter purple.

For most of its history the species was known almost entirely from bare tests. In 1925 Hubert Lyman Clark knew of only one specimen that retained its spines, a small individual from Palmyra Atoll held by the Bishop Museum. Whole animals have since been collected, and living ones photographed, in the Marquesas Islands.

== Distribution ==
In 1912 Agassiz and Clark gave the localities as "Bourbon" (Réunion) and Christmas Island in the Pacific Ocean (Kiritimati), and inferred a range nearly as wide as that of Toxopneustes pileolus. Clark was more cautious in 1925: the British Museum tests labelled "Indian Ocean" he considered "probably wrong", and he regarded the north-eastern tropical Pacific as the only definite area of occurrence.

Museum specimens with locality data come from two island groups. In the Marquesas the species was collected as early as 1922, and specimens taken between 1999 and 2011 are recorded from Eiao, Nuku Hiva, Tahuata and Hiva Oa. In the Line Islands it is recorded from Palmyra Atoll, Kiritimati and Starbuck Island.
