= Syndesmis longicanalis =

Scientific classification
- Kingdom: Animalia
- Phylum: Platyhelminthes
- Order: Rhabdocoela
- Family: Umagillidae
- Genus: Syndesmis
- Species: S. longicanalis

Binomial name
- Syndesmis longicanalis Moens, Martens & Schockaert, 1994

Species of flatworm

Syndesmis longicanalis is a species of marine flatworm endemic to the waters off Kenya. They are commensal symbionts of sea urchins.

== Taxonomy ==
Syndesmis longicanalis belongs to the genus Syndesmis of the subfamily Umagillinae in the family Umagillidae. The specific name longicanalis is Latin for "long canal". It refers to the species' distinctively very long bursal canal. It was first described in 1994 by Jozef B. Moens, Els E. Martens, and Ernest R. Schockaert. The type specimen was recovered in February 1992 from Nyali, Mombasa, Kenya; from the intestine of a flower urchin (Toxopneustes pileolus) recovered from a depth of 2 to 5 m (7 to 16 ft).

== Description ==
Syndesmis longicanalis are red to red-orange in coloration in life. The body is flattened ovoid in shape, with the front end rounded and the rear end tapering to a nipple-like tip. The entire body is covered with cilia.

== Distribution ==
Syndesmis longicanalis is known only from Kenya. The original specimens were collected from Nyali and Bamburi in Mombasa, Kenya. All of the specimens were recovered from within sea urchins.

== Ecology ==
Syndesmis longicanalis are commensal symbionts of two common species of sea urchins: the flower urchin (Toxopneustes pileolus) and the collector urchin (Tripneustes gratilla). They inhabit the intestines of their hosts.
