= Arthur Adams (zoologist) =

English physician and naturalist (1820–1878)

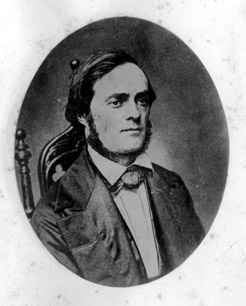
- Born: 1820; Gosport, Hampshire, United Kingdom
- Died: 1878 (aged 57–58)
- Relatives: Henry Adams (brother)
- Scientific career
- Fields: Malacology
- Author abbrev. (zoology): A.Adams

Arthur Adams (1820 in Gosport, Hampshire – 1878) was an English physician and naturalist.

Adams was assistant surgeon Royal Navy on board HMS Samarang during the survey of the islands of the Eastern Archipelago, from 1843 to 1846. He edited the Zoology of the voyage of H.M.S. Samarang (1850). Adam White collaborated with him in the descriptions of the Crustacea from the voyage. In 1857, during the Second China War whilst serving as Surgeon on HMS Actaeon, he was present at the storming of Canton and awarded the China War Medal. He retired as Staff Surgeon aboard flagship HMS Royal Adelaide at Plymouth in 1870.

He was a prolific malacologist who described "hundreds of new species, most of them unillustrated and insufficiently diagnosed". He partly worked together with his brother Henry Adams (1813–1877) and together they wrote The genera of recent mollusca: arranged according to their organization (three volumes, 1858). He also wrote Travels of a naturalist in Japan and Manchuria (1870), and an article about the interesting spiders seen on his travels.

== Works ==
- Arthur Adams (1862). "A Visit to Pratas Island". The Zoologist. 20: 8183–8184 – via Internet Archive.

== Species named after Arthur Adams ==
Finella adamsi (Dall, 1889), Arcopsis adamsi (Dall, 1886), Hinnites adamsi Dall, 1886 (synonym of Pseudohinnites adamsi (Dall, 1886) ), Brachidontes adamsianus (Dunker, 1857), Nucinella adamsi (Dall, 1898); likely Natica adamsiana R. W. Dunker, 1860, possibly Octopus adamsi Benham, 1944 (synonym of Octopus huttoni Benham, 1943), possibly Zebrida adamsii White, 1847.
