= Toxopneustes elegans =

Scientific classification
- Domain: Eukaryota
- Kingdom: Animalia
- Phylum: Echinodermata
- Class: Echinoidea
- Order: Camarodonta
- Family: Toxopneustidae
- Genus: Toxopneustes
- Species: T. elegans

Binomial name
- Toxopneustes elegans Döderlein, 1885
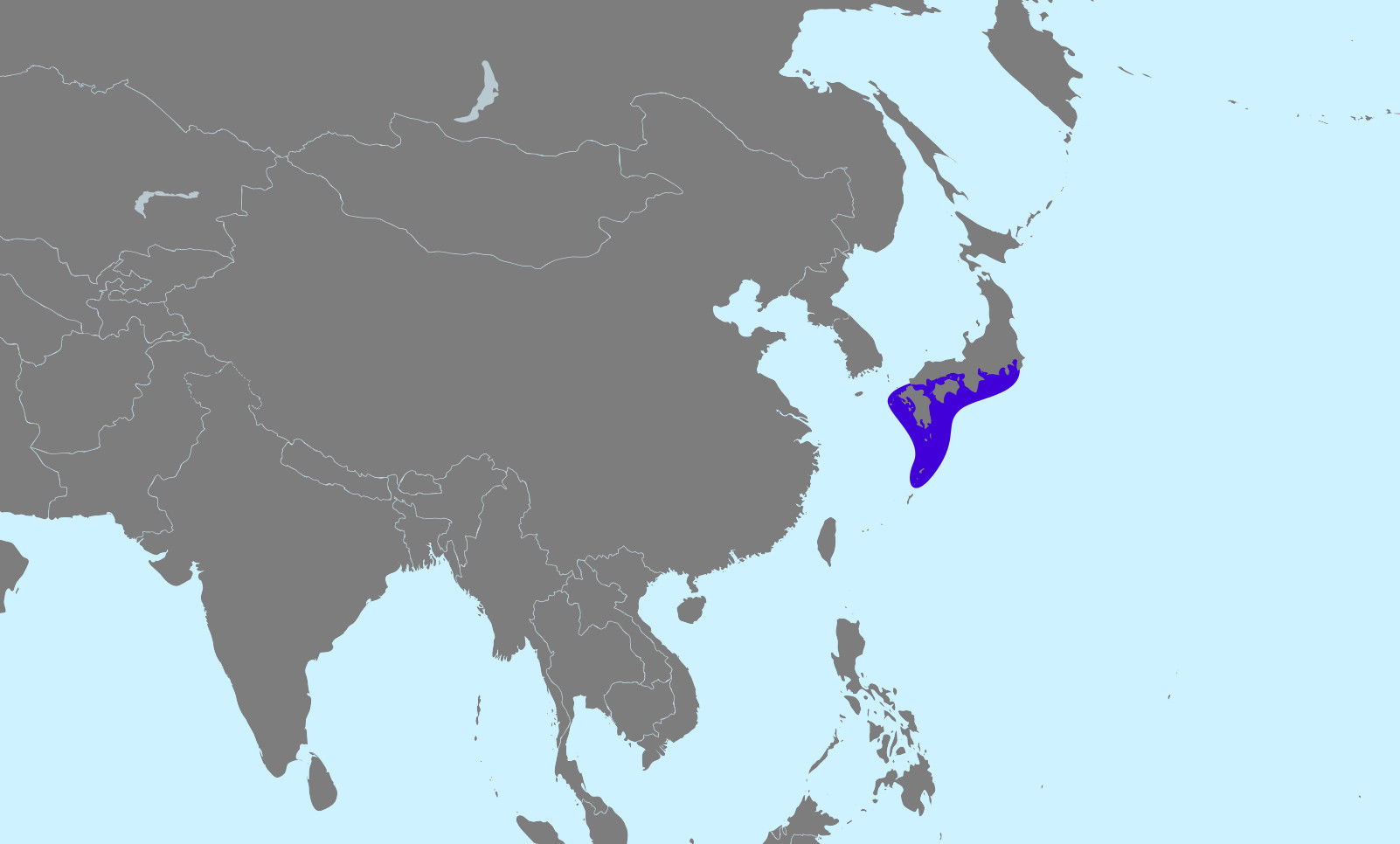
- Estimated range

Species of sea urchin

Toxopneustes elegans is a species of sea urchin endemic to Japan. Like the closely related flower urchin, they are venomous.

== Taxonomy ==
Toxopneustes elegans is one of the four species in the genus Toxopneustes. It was first described by the German zoologist Ludwig Heinrich Philipp Döderlein in 1885. The generic name Toxopneustes literally means "poison breath", derived from Greek τοξικόν [φάρμακον] (toksikón [phármakon], "arrow [poison]") and πνευστος (pneustos, "breath"). The specific name elegans means "elegant" in Latin.

It has no English common name, but it is known as kurosuji-rappa-uni (クロスジラッパウニ) in Japanese (literally "black streaked flower urchin").

== Description ==
Toxopneustes elegans resemble the more common flower urchins, but they are smaller, reaching a maximum diameter of only 10 cm (4 in). They also have smaller pedicellariae, though they are still characteristically flower-like in appearance. The most distinctive feature of the species, however, are the prominent black bands just below the tip of each of the short spines.

== Distribution ==
Toxopneustes elegans is endemic to Japan. They can be found from Sagami Bay in Honshu to the waters around the Amami Islands and Okinawa. They inhabit coral reefs, coral rubble, rocks, sand, and seagrass beds at depths of 2 to 20 m (7 to 66 ft) from the water's surface.

== Venom ==
Like other members of the genus, Toxopneustes elegans is venomous. The flower-like pedicellariae can deliver a painful sting if touched.
