= Pedicellaria =

Small wrench- or claw-shaped appendage found on echinoderms

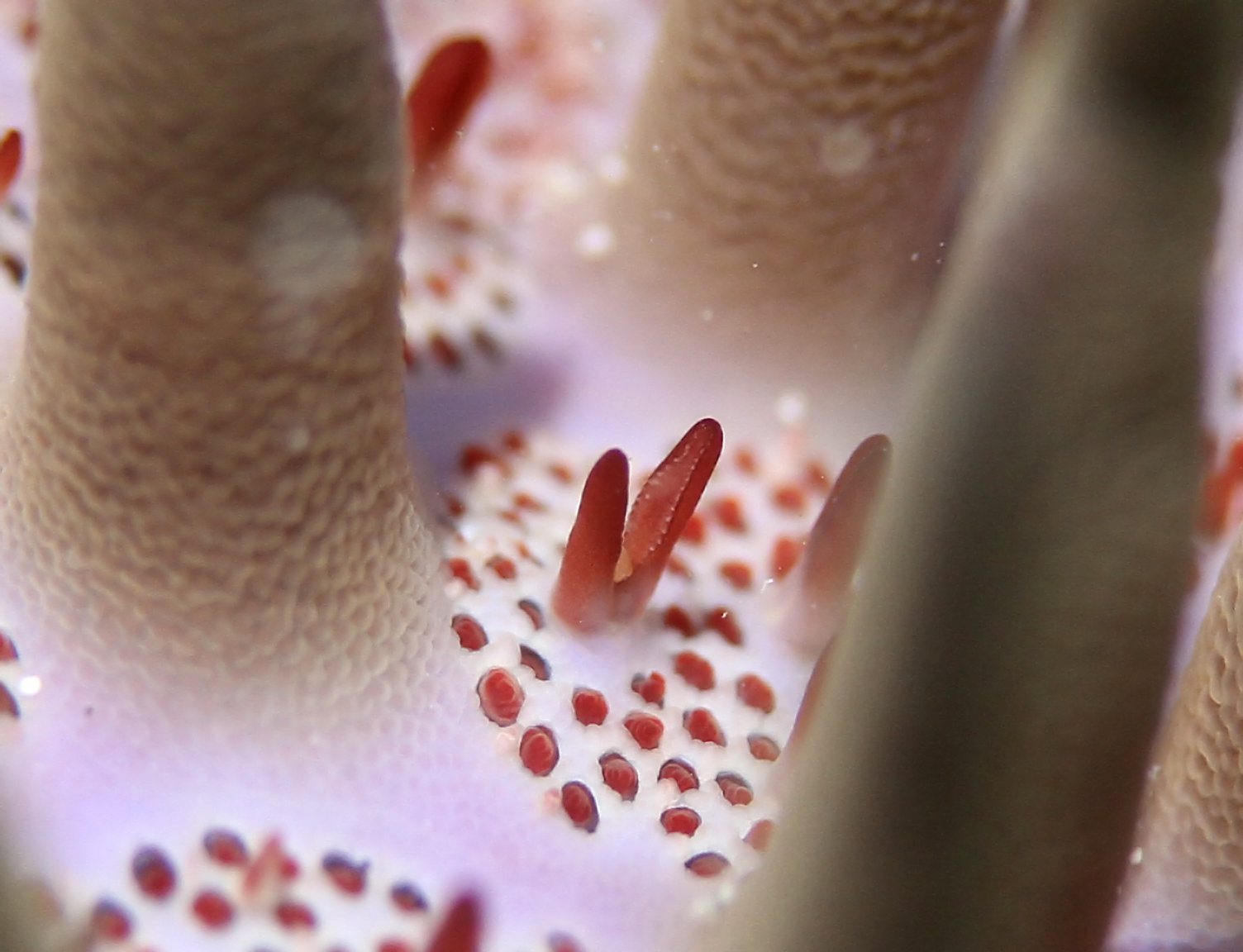
Pedicellaria of Acanthaster planci

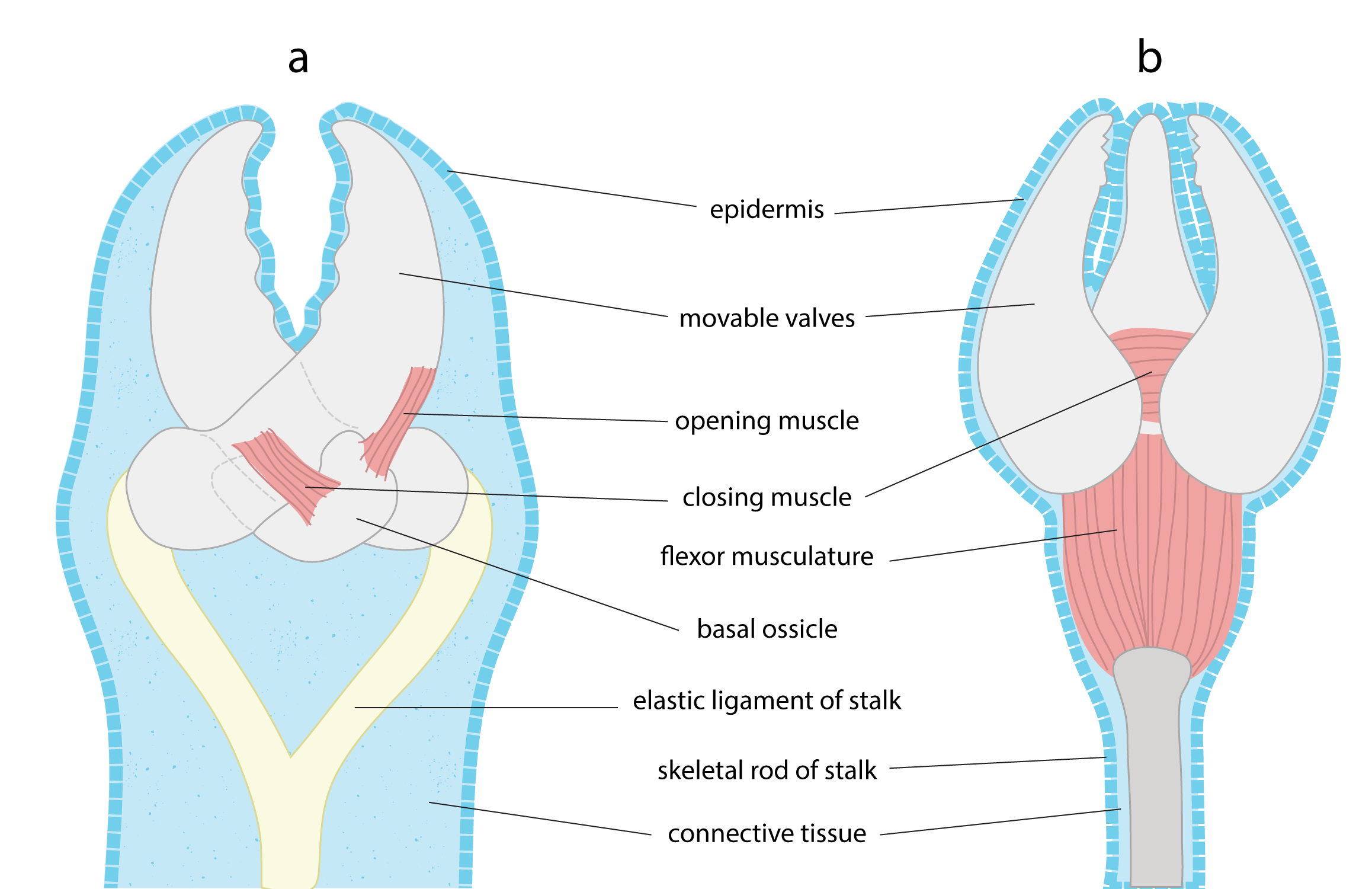
Generalized pedicellaria of an (a) asteroid and (b) echinoid

A pedicellaria (pl.: pedicellariae) is a small wrench- or claw-shaped appendage with movable jaws, called valves, commonly found on echinoderms (phylum Echinodermata), particularly in sea stars (class Asteroidea) and sea urchins (class Echinoidea).

Each pedicellaria is an effector organ with its own set of muscles, neuropils, and sensory receptors and is therefore capable of reflex responses to the environment. Pedicellariae are poorly understood but in some taxa, they are thought to keep the body surface clear of algae, encrusting organisms, and other debris in conjunction with the ciliated epidermis present in all echinoderms.

These structures are derived from the mesodermal skeleton.

== In sea stars ==
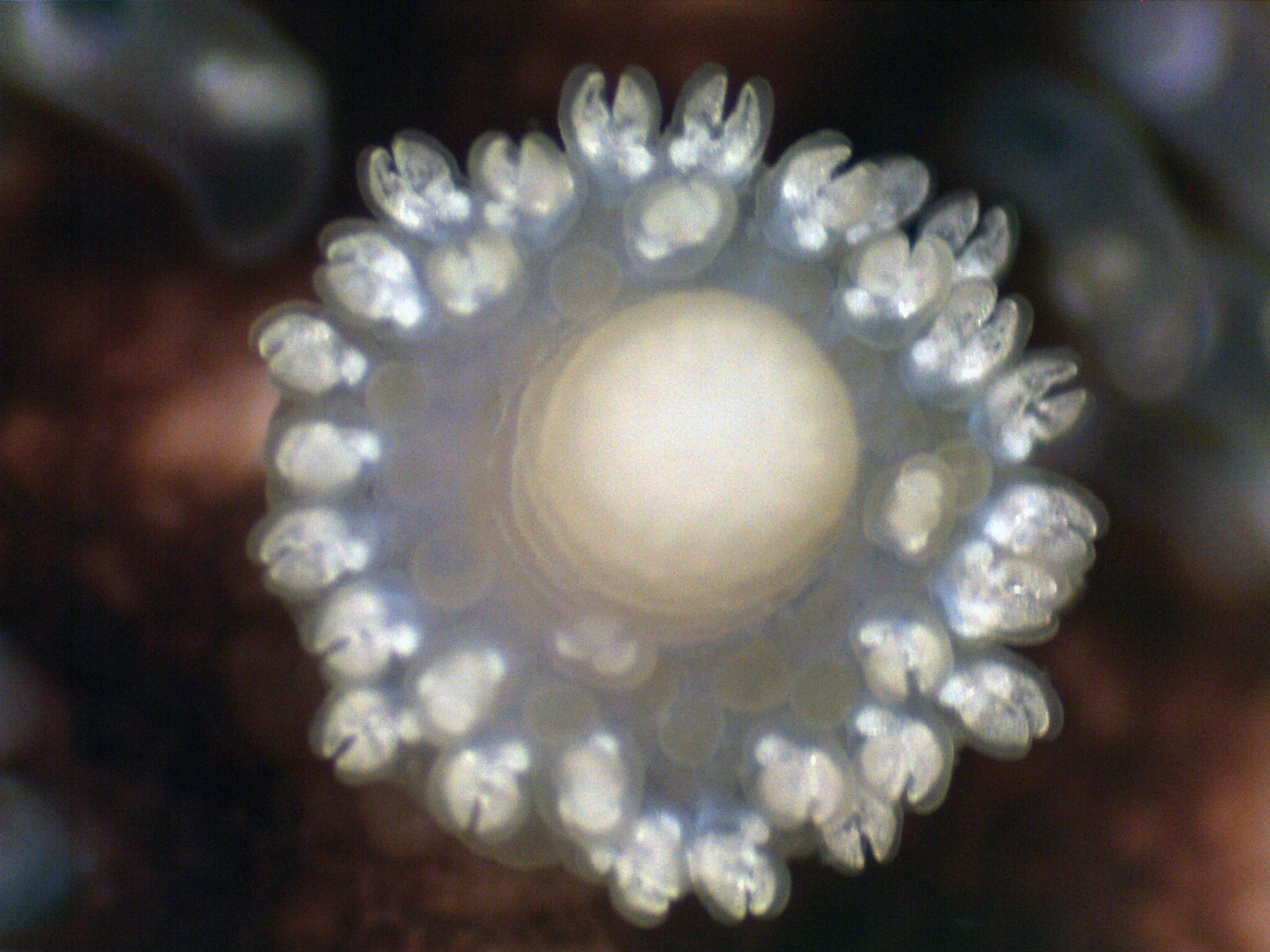
Aboral surface of an Asterias forbesi sea star showing ring of pedicellariae surrounding spine

=== Types ===
There are two major types of pedicellaria in sea stars: straight and crossed. Straight pedicellaria are typically larger and located on the body surface, whereas crossed pedicellaria are smaller and found more commonly on stalks, raised above the body surface or in clumps circling the spines. The crossed type is connected to the test by an elastic ligament.

=== Location ===
Sea star pedicellariae may be located on the test's surface or mounted on flexible stalks. Depending on the species, pedicellariae may be surrounding the spines, on the surface of the animal's body, in pits on the abactinal, marginal, or actinal surface, and/or within the adambulacral plate adjacent to the tube foot furrow. Forcipulate sea star are so called because each pedicellaria is typically composed of three forceps-like valves. Other asteroids can have pedicellariae composed of only two components.

=== Function ===
Pedicellariae in some taxa, such as the deep-sea Brisingida, and the Antarctic Labidiaster are known to function in food capture.

== In sea urchins ==
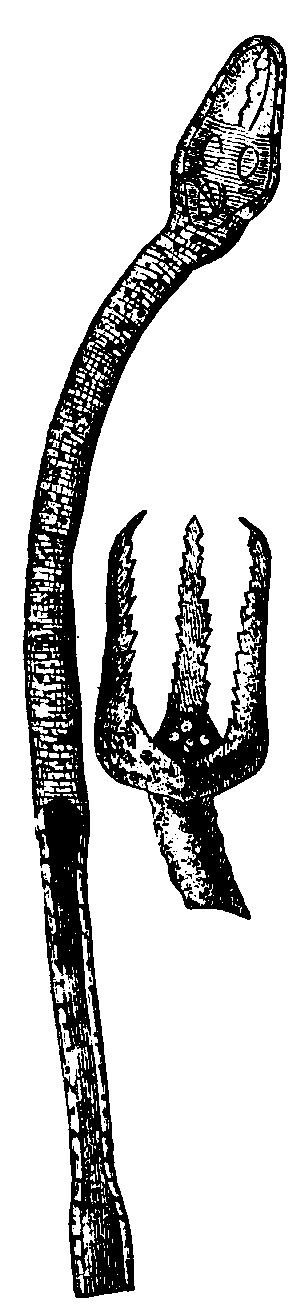
Enlarged pedicellariae of Echinus

=== Types ===
Four main forms of pedicellariae are found in sea urchins : tridactylous, ophicephalous, triphyllous and globiferous. There are typically three valves that make up the jaw of sea urchin pedicellaria. The stalk is composed of a skeletal rod and a flexible neck portion.

=== Location ===
They are generally attached by a long, inflexible stalk and may be found anywhere on the sea urchin's test.

=== Function ===
In some families, globigerous pedicellariae have evolved into venomous structures, used for protection or maybe hunting. This is particularly the case in the family Toxopneustidae, some species such as Tripneustes gratilla and especially Toxopneustes pileolus being extremely venomous.

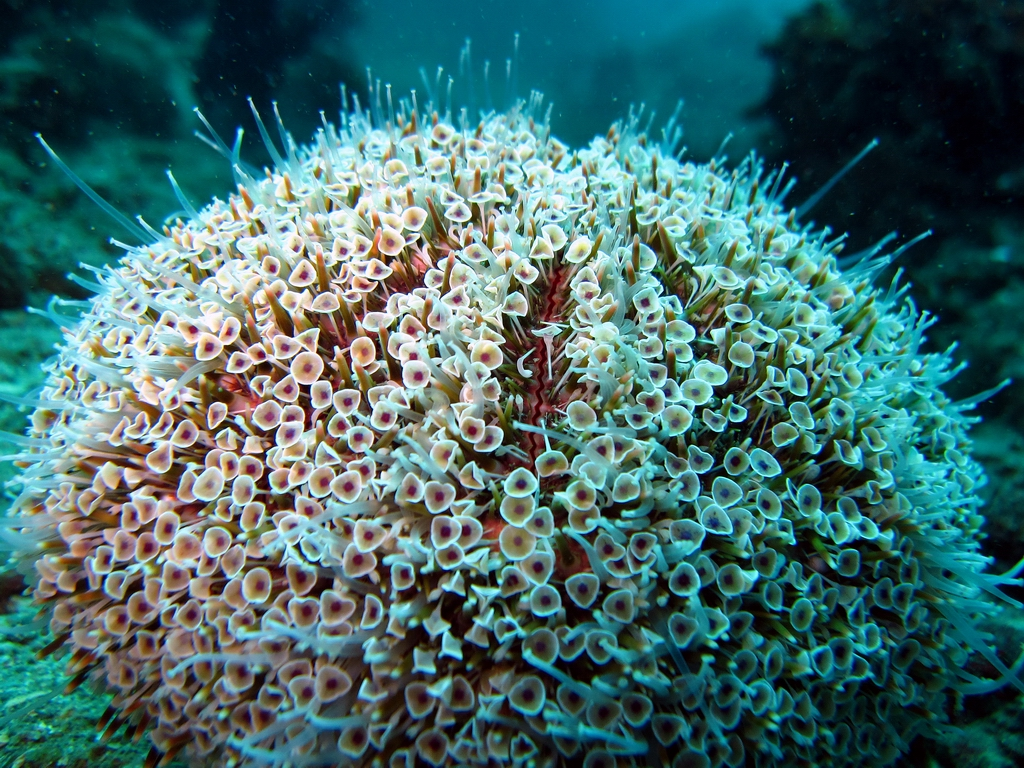
The flower urchin, with its long flower-like venomous pedicellariae

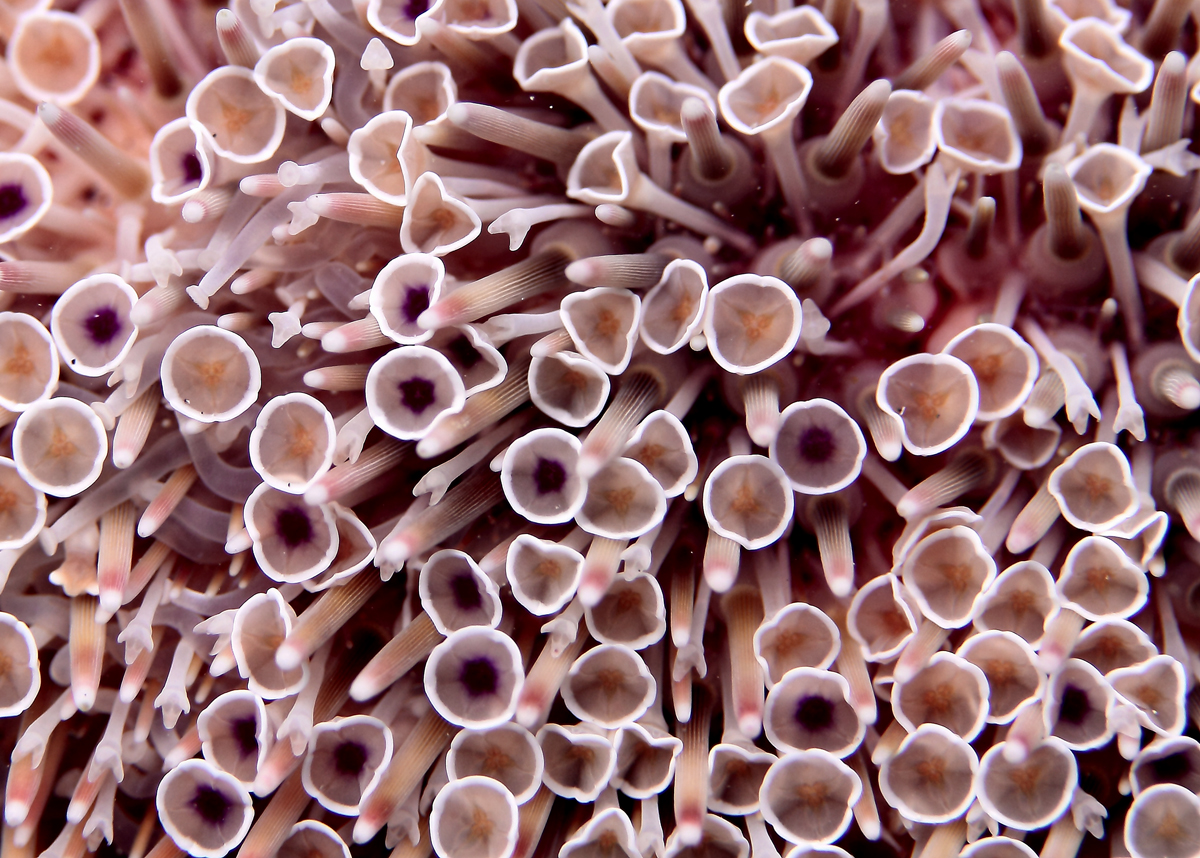
Close-up of flower urchin pedicellariae

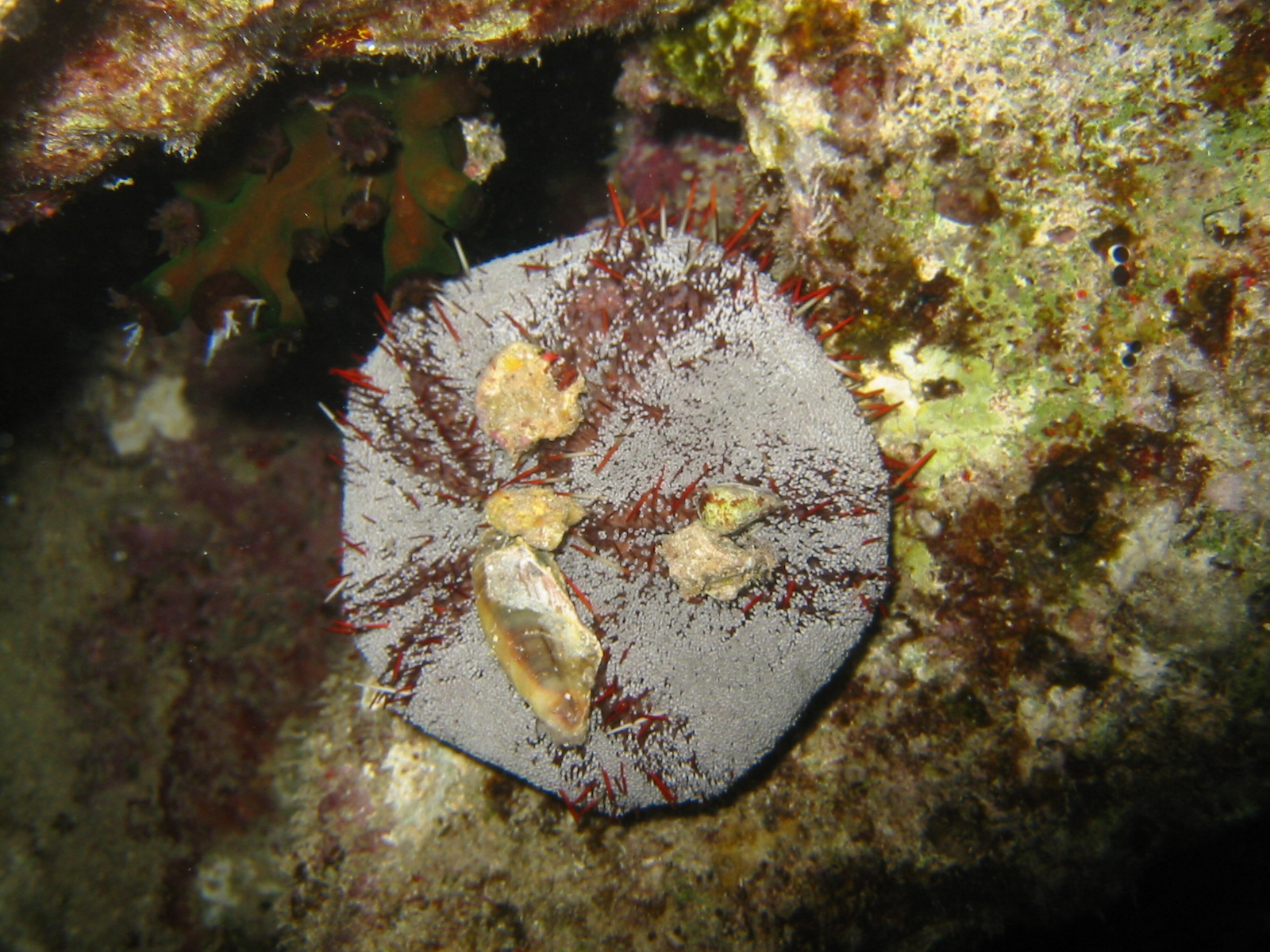
Tripneustes gratilla is also covered with venomous pedicellariae
