= Ambulacral =

Anatomical term

Ambulacral is a term typically used in the context of anatomical parts of the phylum Echinodermata. Echinoderms can have ambulacral parts that include ossicles, plates, spines, and suckers. For example, sea stars or "star fish" have an ambulacral groove on their oral side (underside). This ambulacral groove extends from the mouth to the end of each ray or arm. Each groove of each arm in turn has four rows of hollow tube feet that can be extended or withdrawn. Opposite the ambulacral groove is an ambulacral ridge on the aboral side of each ray, known as an ambulacrum. These have interambulacra between them.

== Etymology ==
From the Latin 'ambulācrum', meaning 'walk planted with trees', 'avenue', 'alley' and 'walking place' Derives from' 'ambulāre', meaning 'to walk' or 'Amble' meaning 'To walk slowly or leisurely'.

Has Indo-European roots - deriving from 'Ambhi'
