= White sea urchin =

White sea urchin is a common name for several sea urchins and may refer to:

- Lytechinus anamesus
- Salmacis sphaeroides
- Tripneustes depressus, found in the Pacific Ocean
- Tripneustes ventricosus, found in the Caribbean Sea
