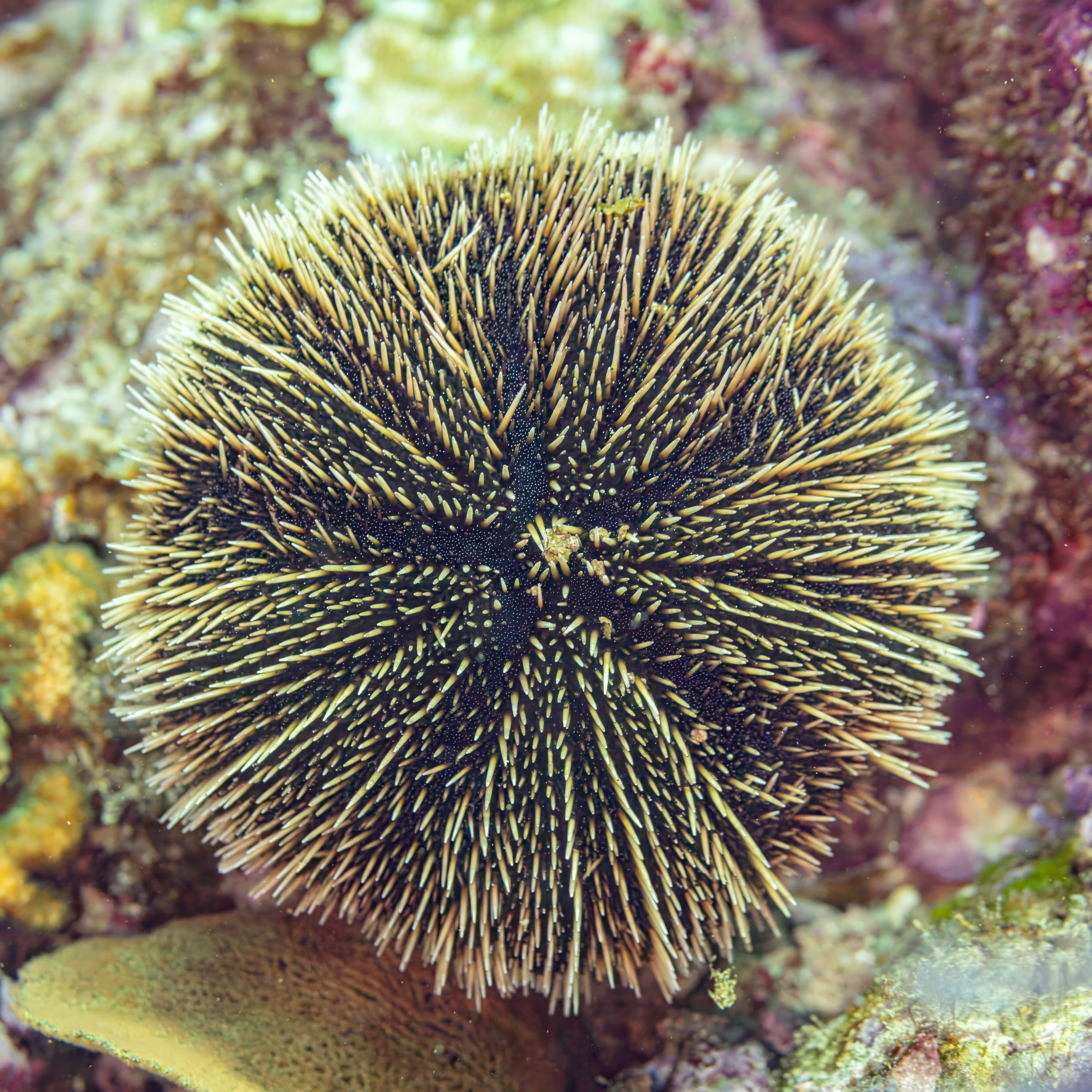

Scientific classification
- Domain: Eukaryota
- Kingdom: Animalia
- Phylum: Echinodermata
- Class: Echinoidea
- Order: Camarodonta
- Family: Toxopneustidae
- Genus: Tripneustes
- Species: T. depressus

Binomial name
- Tripneustes depressus (A. Agassiz, 1863)

Synonyms
- Hipponoe depressa (A. Agassiz, 1863)

= Tripneustes depressus =

Species of sea urchin

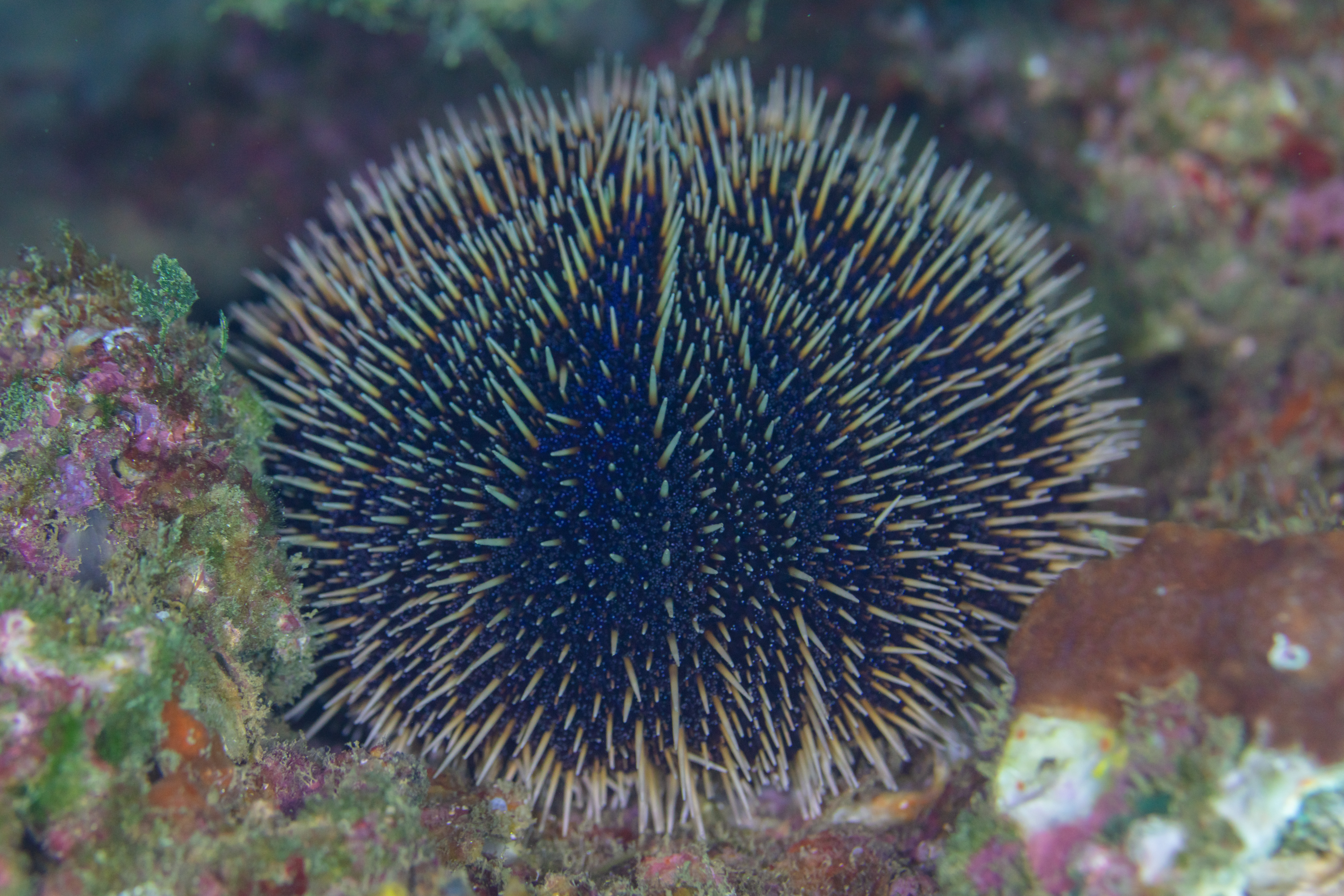
Side view

Tripneustes depressus, the white sea urchin or sea egg, is a species of sea urchin in the family Toxopneustidae. It is found on the seabed in the tropical eastern Pacific Ocean including Mexico, Panama, Ecuador and the Galápagos Islands.

== Description ==
Tripneustes depressus is the largest sea urchin species in the Galápagos Islands with a mean diameter of 11.5 cm (4.5 in). The growth rate averages 0.5 mm (0.02 in) per month. There is very little difference in morphology between T. depressus, Tripneustes gratilla and Tripneustes ventricosus; they are suspected of being the same species and genetic analysis strengthens this argument. T. ventricosus is found in the Caribbean and may have been separated from T. depressus by the closing of the land bridge between North and South America. T. gratilla has a wide range in the tropical Indo-Pacific, from East Africa to Hawaii.

== Distribution ==
Tripneustes depressus is found in the tropical eastern Pacific Ocean, occurring in Mexico, on the western coast of Central America, in Panama, in Ecuador and around the Galápagos Islands. It is found intertidally and subtidally. There is a great variation in its abundance around the Galápagos, and overall it seems to be ten times as common in 2012 as it was four decades earlier.

== Ecology ==
The diet of T. depressus consists largely of algae and possibly also fragments of seagrass. Red filamentous algae is the main dietary constituent but pieces of sponge and other invertebrates have been found among its stomach contents. It may in fact be a generalist feeder rather than a herbivore, as in time of food scarcity, it sometimes turns cannibalistic.

== Research ==
It has been shown that the coelomic fluid in the body cavity of T. depressus contains peptides that act as antivirals against the pseudorabies virus (SuHV1) and the rabies virus (RV), despite the fact that neither of these viruses affect sea urchins; molecules from this species may be the basis for new drugs in the future.
