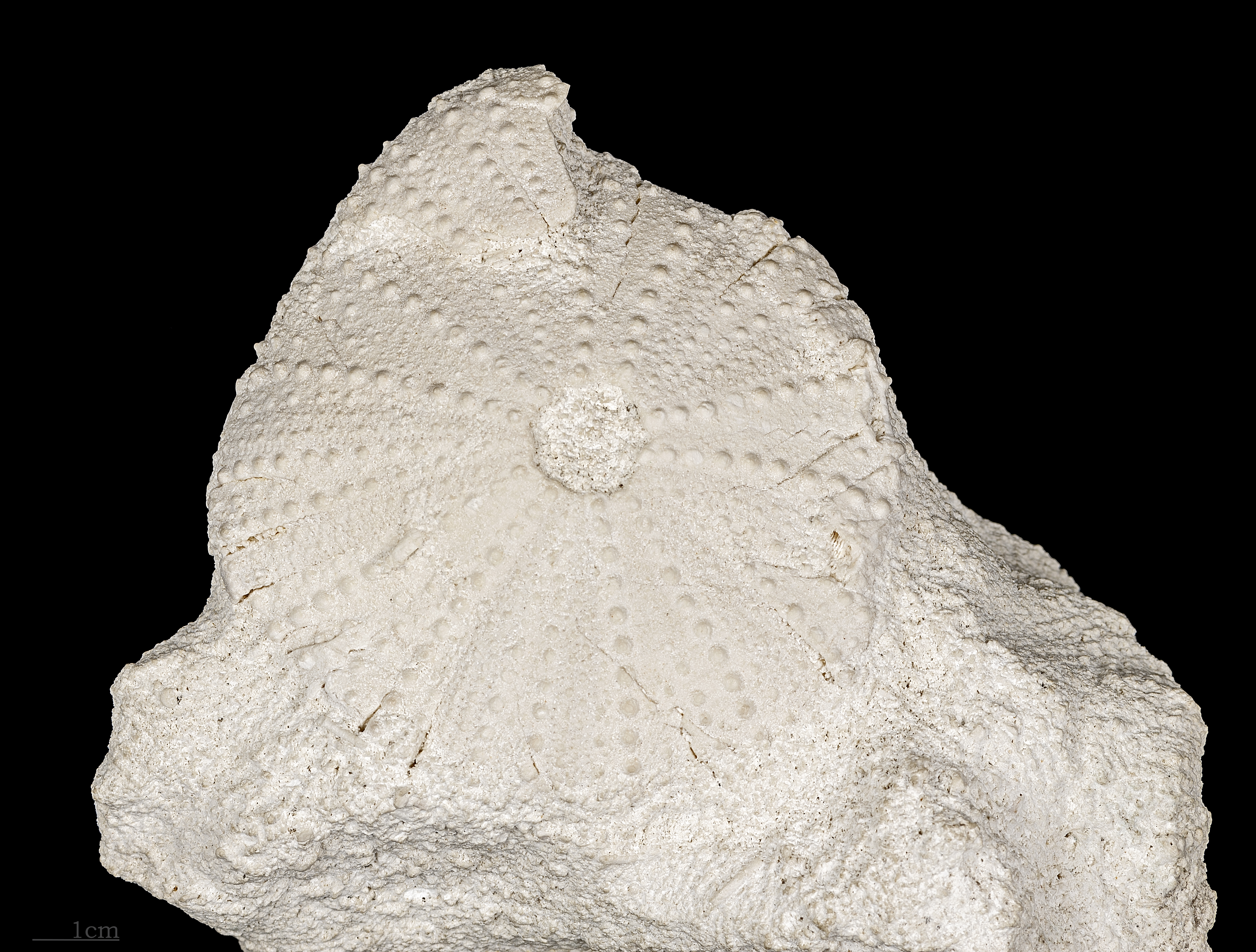
- Tripneustes parkinsoni from Miocene of France (20 Ma)

Scientific classification
- Kingdom: Animalia
- Phylum: Echinodermata
- Class: Echinoidea
- Order: Camarodonta
- Family: Toxopneustidae
- Genus: Tripneustes
- Species: †T. parkinsoni

Binomial name
- †Tripneustes parkinsoni Agassiz in Agassiz & Desor 1846

= Tripneustes parkinsoni =

Tripneustes parkinsoni Temporal range: Miocene

Extinct species of sea urchin

Tripneustes parkinsoni is a species of sea urchins belonging to the family Toxopneustidae. These sea urchins have been recorded as fossils on the Miocene of southern France (abt. 20 Ma).
