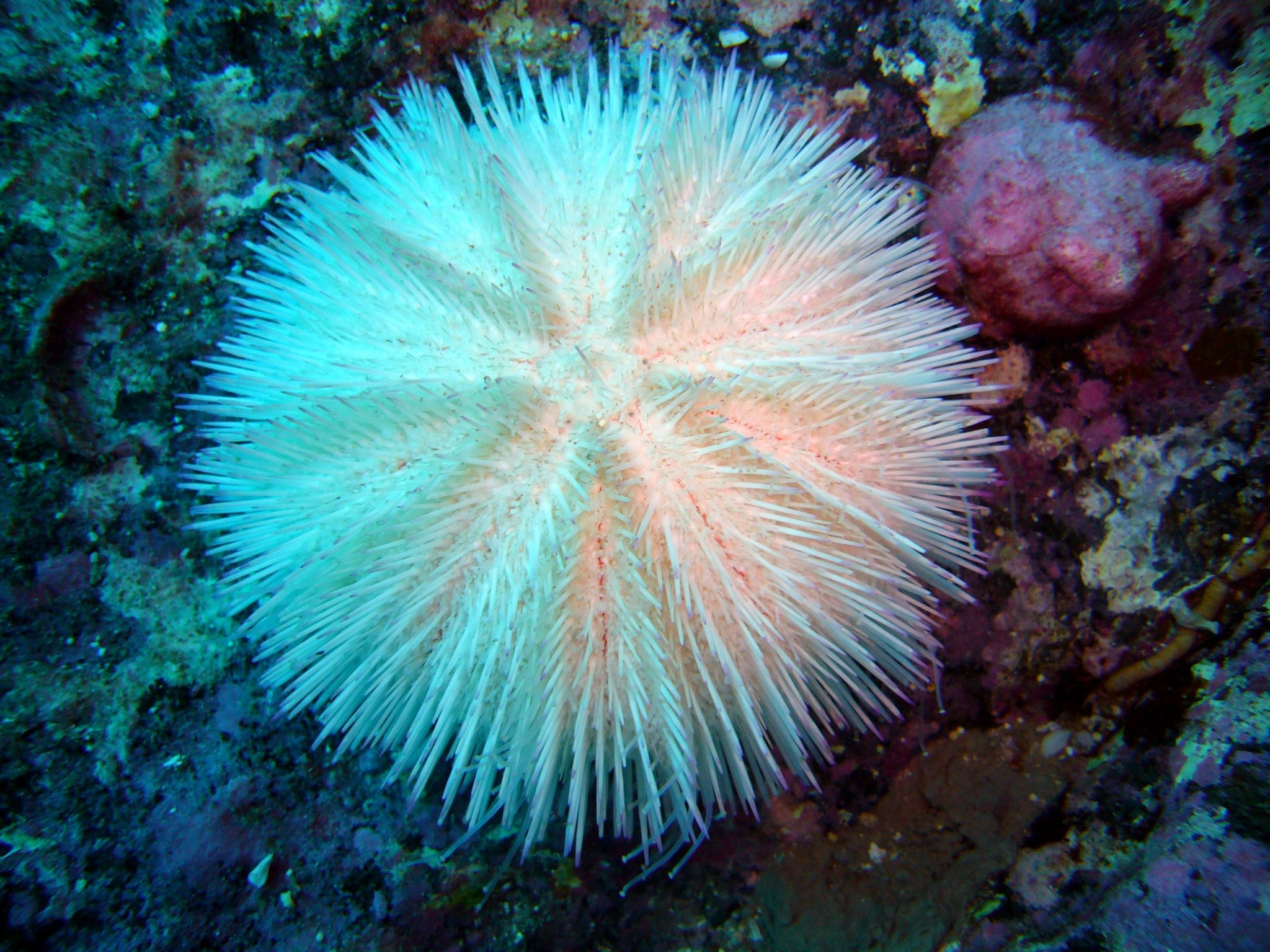

Scientific classification
- Kingdom: Animalia
- Phylum: Echinodermata
- Class: Echinoidea
- Order: Camarodonta
- Family: Toxopneustidae
- Genus: Pseudoboletia
- Species: P. indiana

Binomial name
- Pseudoboletia indiana (Michelin, 1862)

= Pseudoboletia indiana =

Species of echinoderm

Pseudoboletia indiana, commonly known as the pebble collector urchin, is a species of echinoderms belonging to the family Toxopneustidae. In Hawaii P. indiana is also known as hawa`e po`ohina.

== Description ==
Pseudoboletia indiana has a white round body with short spikes, variously colored white, pink, purple, or green at the ends. Pseudoboletia indiana is on average around 5 in (130 mm) in diameter.

== Distribution ==
The pebble collector urchin can be found in Hawaii, New Zealand, Easter Island, and Madagascar.

== Habitat ==
Pseudoboletia indiana lives on the ocean floor, at up to 100 m (330 ft) in depth. The urchin uses debris from the ocean, such as pebbles, broken pieces or coral, seaweed, to cover itself. The urchin also provides protection to other smaller marine life like the miner’s urchin shrimp (Gnathophylloides mineri). During the night, the urchin will abandon the pebbles and coral it uses as camouflage and will roam around.
