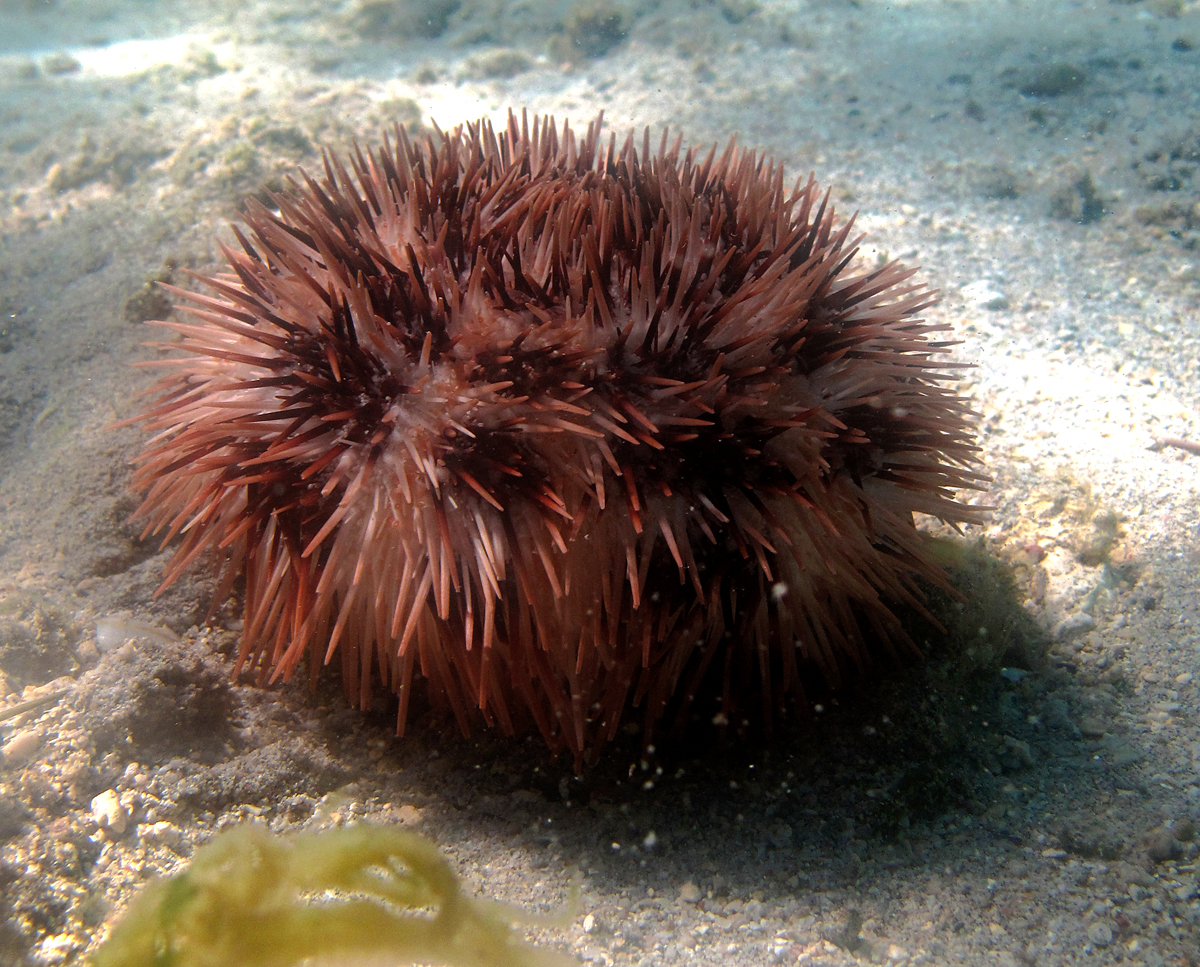

Scientific classification
- Kingdom: Animalia
- Phylum: Echinodermata
- Class: Echinoidea
- Order: Camarodonta
- Family: Toxopneustidae
- Genus: Pseudoboletia
- Species: P. maculata

Binomial name
- Pseudoboletia maculata Troschel, 1869

= Pseudoboletia maculata =

Species of sea urchin

Pseudoboletia maculata is a species of sea urchin. It is found in the western central Pacific Ocean. It is known in Indonesia, the tropical eastern Indian Ocean, and on the Great Barrier Reef. This species is reef-associated, and lives at depths of between 10 and 82 metres.
