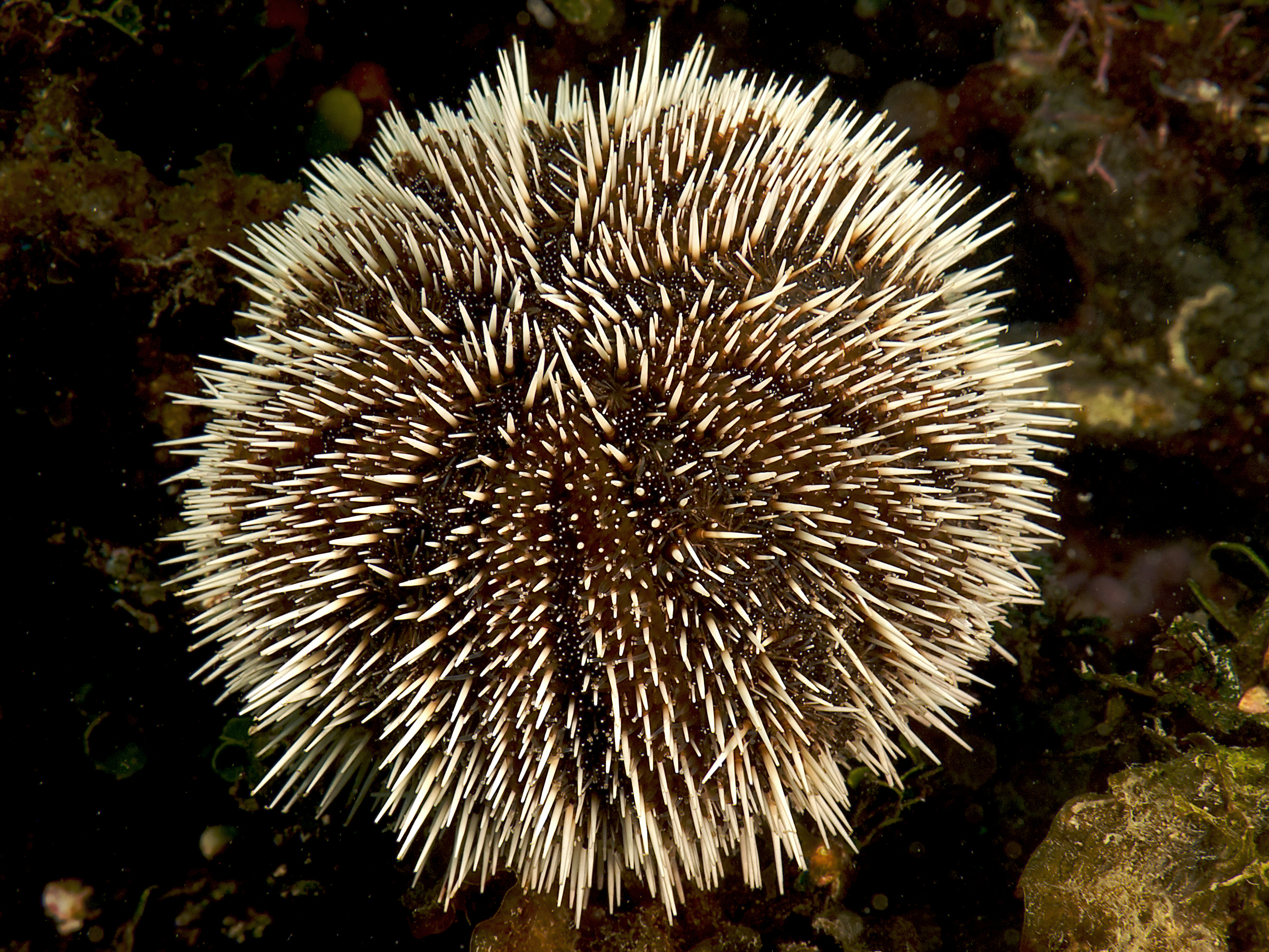
- Tripneustes ventricosus

Scientific classification
- Kingdom: Animalia
- Phylum: Echinodermata
- Class: Echinoidea
- Order: Camarodonta
- Family: Toxopneustidae
- Genus: Tripneustes; L. Agassiz, 1841

= Tripneustes =

Tripneustes Temporal range: Miocene to Recent

Genus of sea urchins

Tripneustes is a genus of sea urchins belonging to the family Toxopneustidae.

== Species ==
The genus contains four extant species:

Image	Scientific name	Distribution
	Tripneustes depressus Agassiz, 1863	eastern Pacific Ocean, occurring in Mexico, on the western coast of Central America, in Panama, in Ecuador and around the Galápagos Islands
	Tripneustes gratilla (Linnaeus, 1758)	Indo-Pacific, Hawaii, the Red Sea, and The Bahamas.
	Tripneustes kermadecensis Bronstein, Kroh, Tautscher, Liggins & Haring, 2017	southern Pacific Ocean, off the Kermadec Islands
	Tripneustes ventricosus (Lamarck, 1816)	western Atlantic Ocean, the Caribbean Sea and Gulf of Mexico

This genus contains many extinct species, such as:

- † Tripneustes antiquus Duncan & Sladen, 1855
- † Tripneustes californicus Kew, 1920
- † Tripneustes gahardensis (Seunes)
- † Tripneustes magnificus Nisiyama, 1966
- † Tripneustes parkinsoni (Agassiz, 1847)
- † Tripneustes pregratilla McNamara and Kendrick 1994
- † Tripneustes proavia Duncan & Sladen, 1855
- † Tripneustes schneideri Boehm
- † Tripneustes tobleri Jeannet, 1928a

== Distribution ==
These sea urchins have been recorded as fossils from Miocene to Recent (from 15.97 to 0.0 Ma). Fossils have been found in the sediments of Southern Europe, Mediterranean and North Africa, Caribbean, Western coast of America and throughout the Indo-Pacific.

== Gallery ==
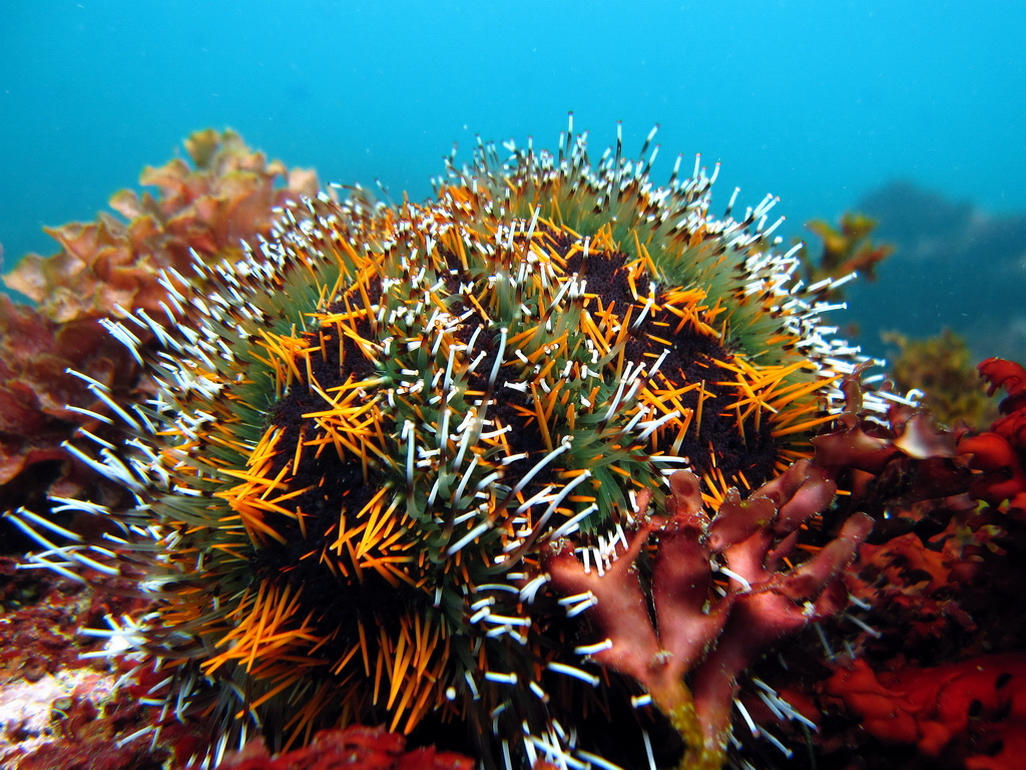
Tripneustes gratilla

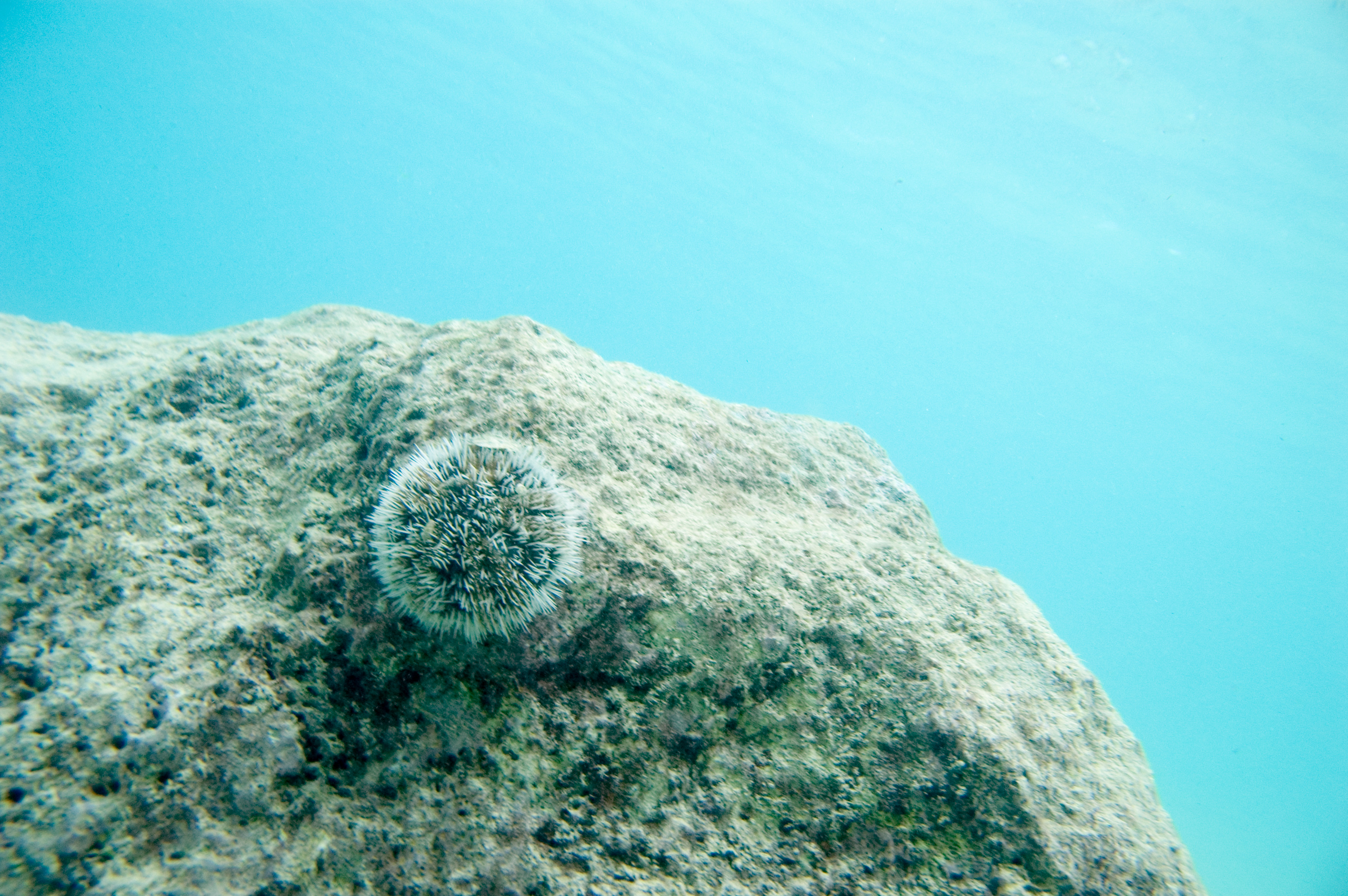
Tripneustes ventricosus

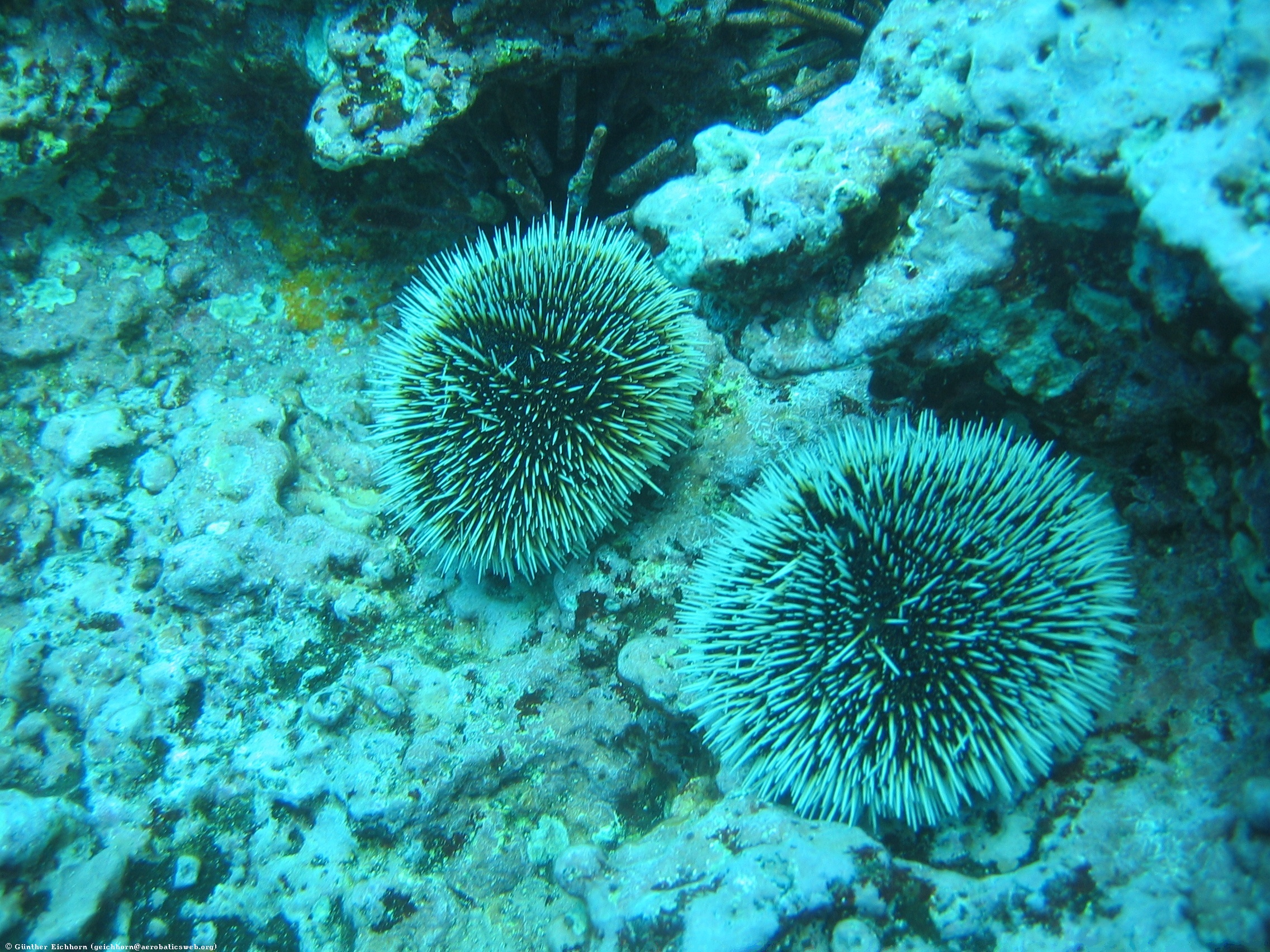
Tripneustes depressus

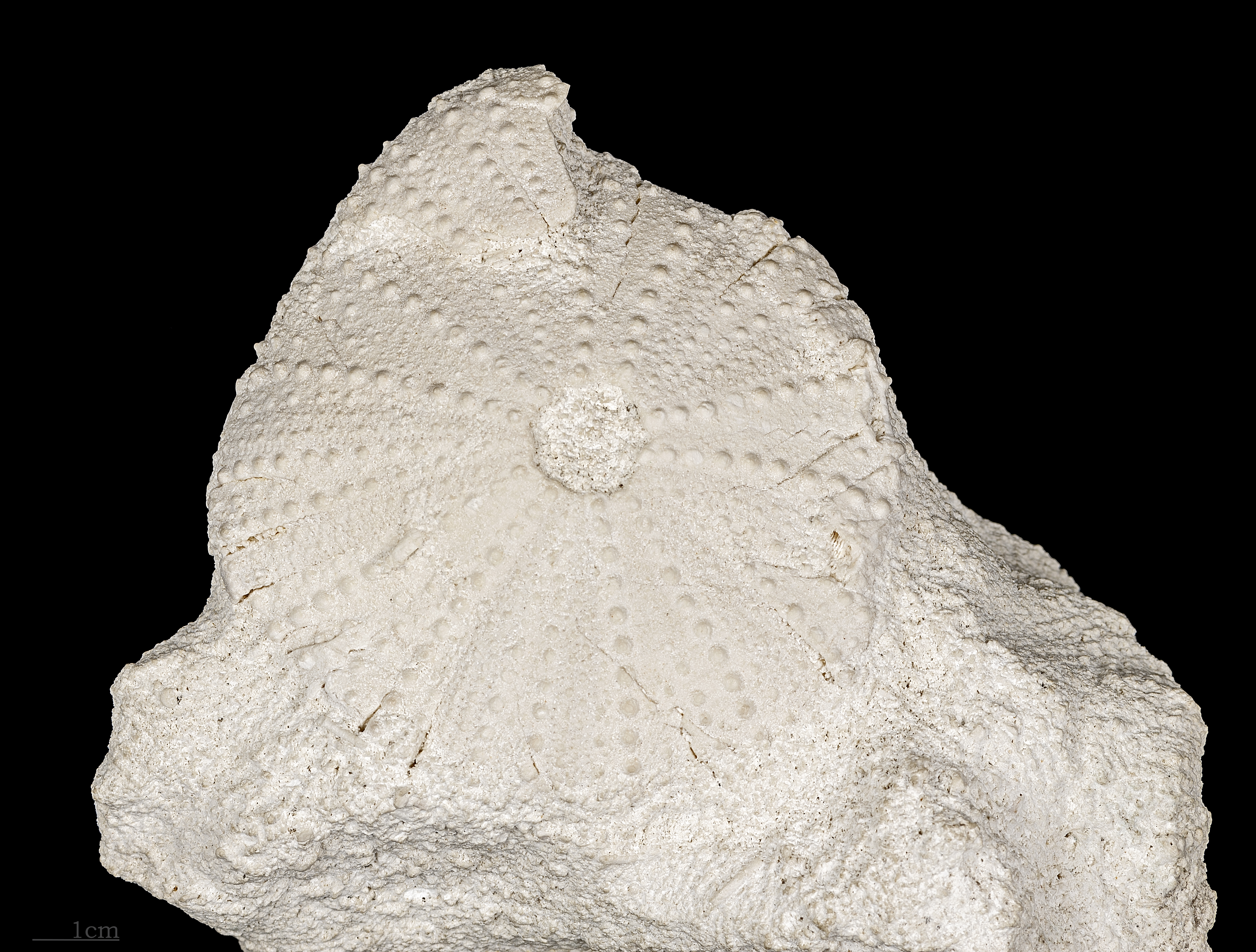
Fossil Tripneustes parkinsoni (Burdigalian, Muséum de Toulouse).

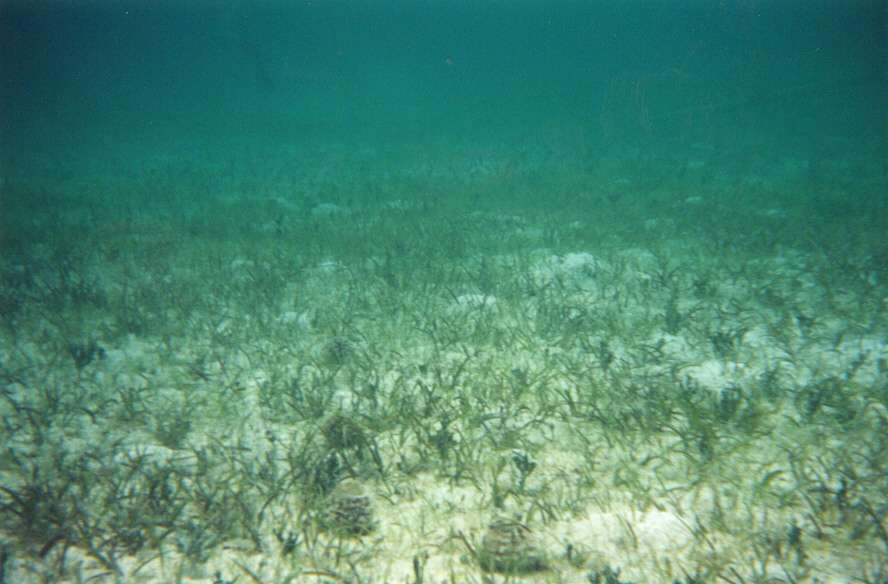
Several Tripneustes in seagrass, Grahams Harbour, San Salvador Island, Bahamas
