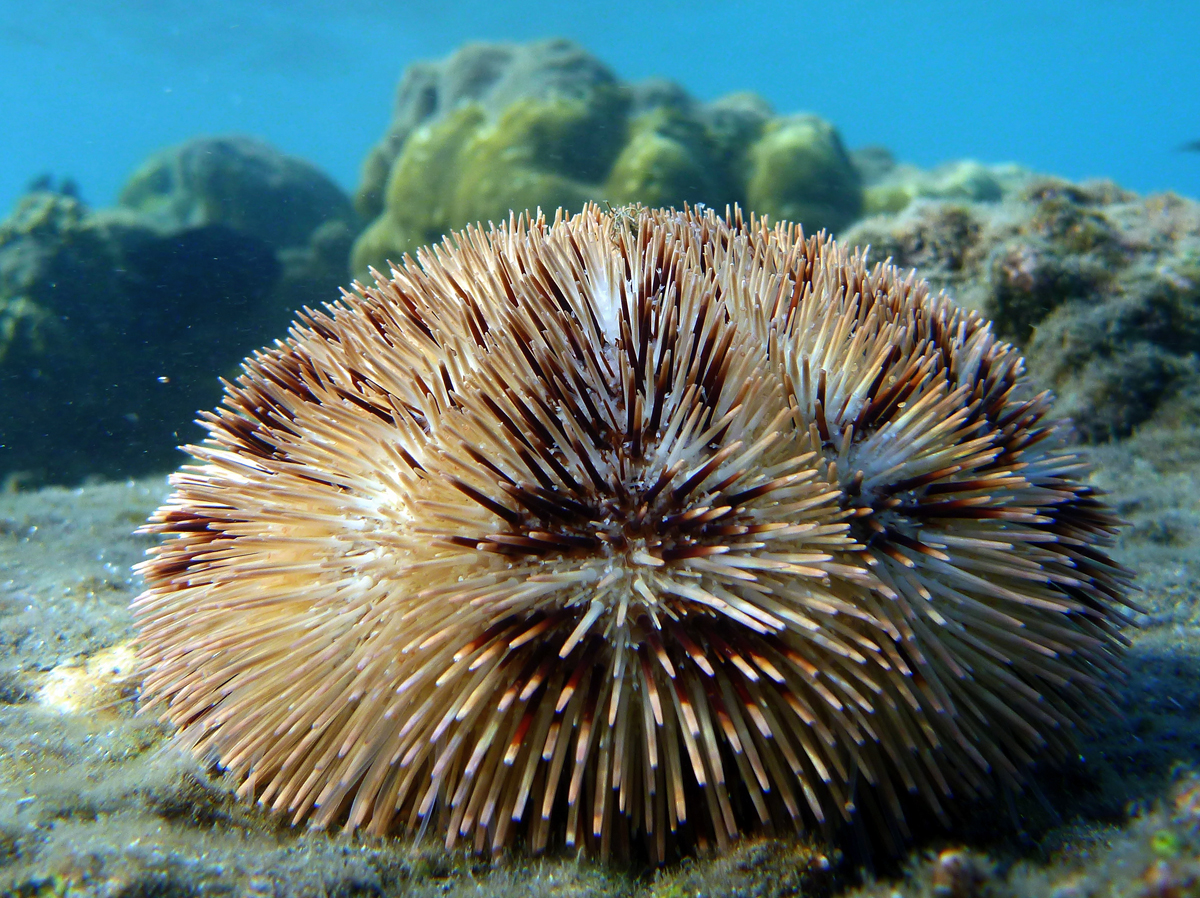
- Pseudoboletia maculata

Scientific classification
- Kingdom: Animalia
- Phylum: Echinodermata
- Class: Echinoidea
- Order: Camarodonta
- Family: Toxopneustidae
- Genus: Pseudoboletia; Troschel, 1869

= Pseudoboletia =

Genus of sea urchins

Pseudoboletia is a genus of sea urchins.

== Species ==
Image	Scientific name	Distribution
	Pseudoboletia atlantica H.L. Clark, 1912	South Atlantic Ocean
	Pseudoboletia indiana (Michelin, 1862)	Madagascar to Hawaii and Easter Island and from Japan to Australia
	Pseudoboletia maculata Troschel, 1869	western central Pacific Ocean, eastern Indian Ocean, and on the Great Barrier Reef
	Pseudoboletia occidentalis H.L. Clark, 1921	Barbados and Antigua
