= Gymnechinus =

Scientific classification
- Kingdom: Animalia
- Phylum: Echinodermata
- Class: Echinoidea
- Order: Camarodonta
- Family: Toxopneustidae
- Genus: Gymnechinus; Mortensen, 1903

Genus of sea urchins

Gymnechinus, is a genus of sea urchins.

== Species ==
- Gymnechinus abnormalis H.L. Clark, 1925
- Gymnechinus epistichus H.L. Clark, 1912
- Gymnechinus pulchellus Mortensen, 1904
- Gymnechinus robillardi (de Loriol, 1883)
