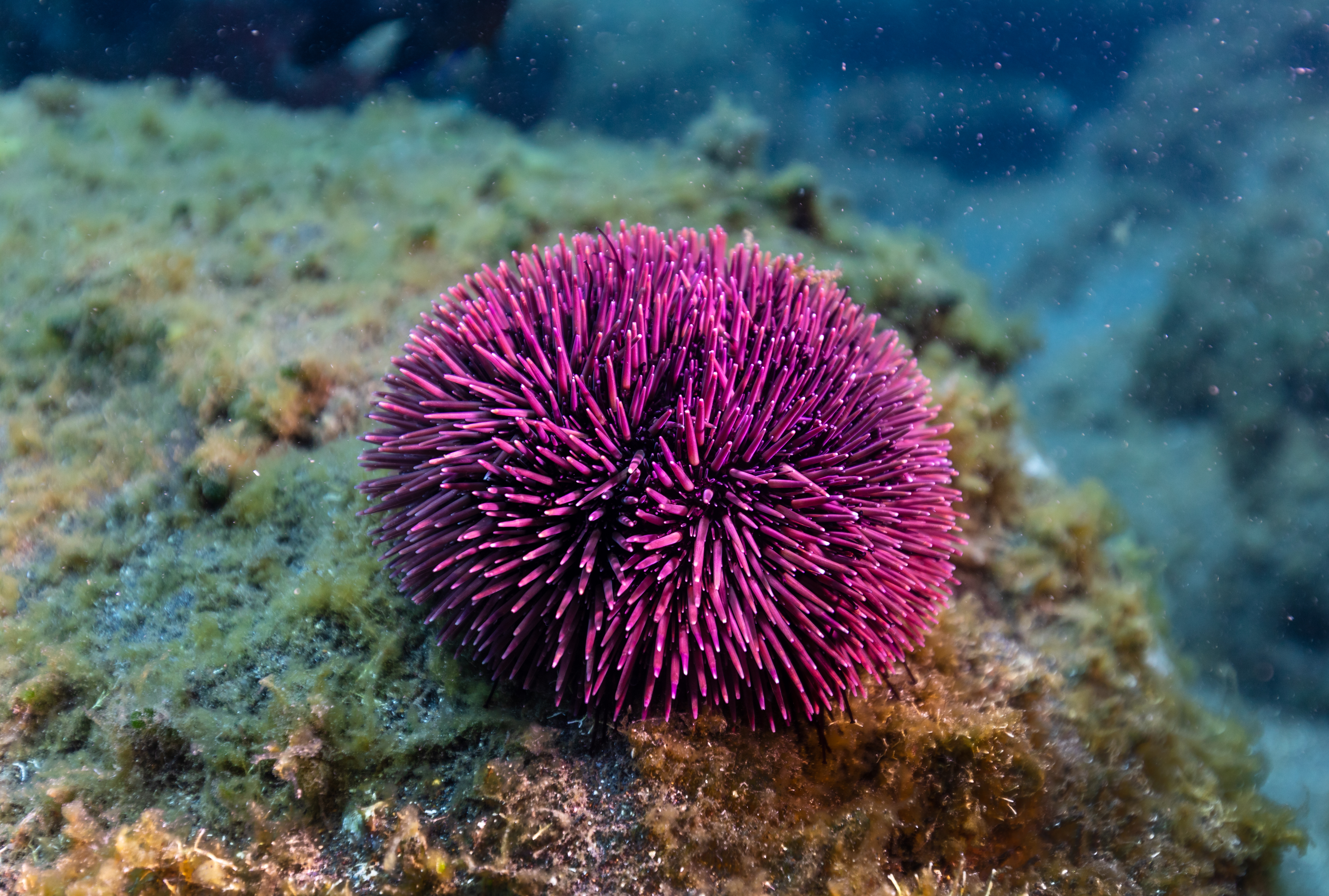
- Sphaerechinus granularis on Madeira

Scientific classification
- Kingdom: Animalia
- Phylum: Echinodermata
- Class: Echinoidea
- Order: Camarodonta
- Family: Toxopneustidae
- Genus: Sphaerechinus; Desor, 1856
- Species: S. granularis

Binomial name
- Sphaerechinus granularis (Lamarck, 1816)

Synonyms
- Echinus (Toxopneustes) albidus (L. Agassiz, 1841); Echinus (Toxopneustes) brevispinosus (Blainville, 1825); Echinus (Toxopneustes) granularis (Lamarck, 1816); Echinus albidus L. Agassiz, 1841; Echinus brevispinosus Blainville, 1825; Echinus dubius Blainville, 1825; Echinus granularis de Lamarck, 1816; Echinus subglobiformis Blainville, 1825; Sphærechinus brevispinosus (Blainville, 1825); Sphærechinus ovarius Lambert & Thiéry, 1914; Sphaerechinus roseus Russo, 1893; Strongylocentrotus granularis (Lamarck, 1816); Toxopneustes brevispinosus (L. Agassiz, 1841)

= Sphaerechinus =

Species of sea urchin

Sphaerechinus granularis is a species of sea urchin in the family Toxopneustidae, commonly known as the violet sea urchin, or sometimes the purple sea urchin (though the latter is also a common name for a Pacific sea urchin Strongylocentrotus purpuratus). It is the only species in the genus Sphaerechinus. Its range includes the Mediterranean Sea and eastern Atlantic Ocean.

== Description ==
Sphaerechinus granularis is a large sea urchin, somewhat flattened dorsally and growing to fifteen centimetres in diameter. There are two distinct colour forms. The test is purple in both but one has purple spines and the other white. The spines are short and blunt, all the same length, and arranged neatly in rows.

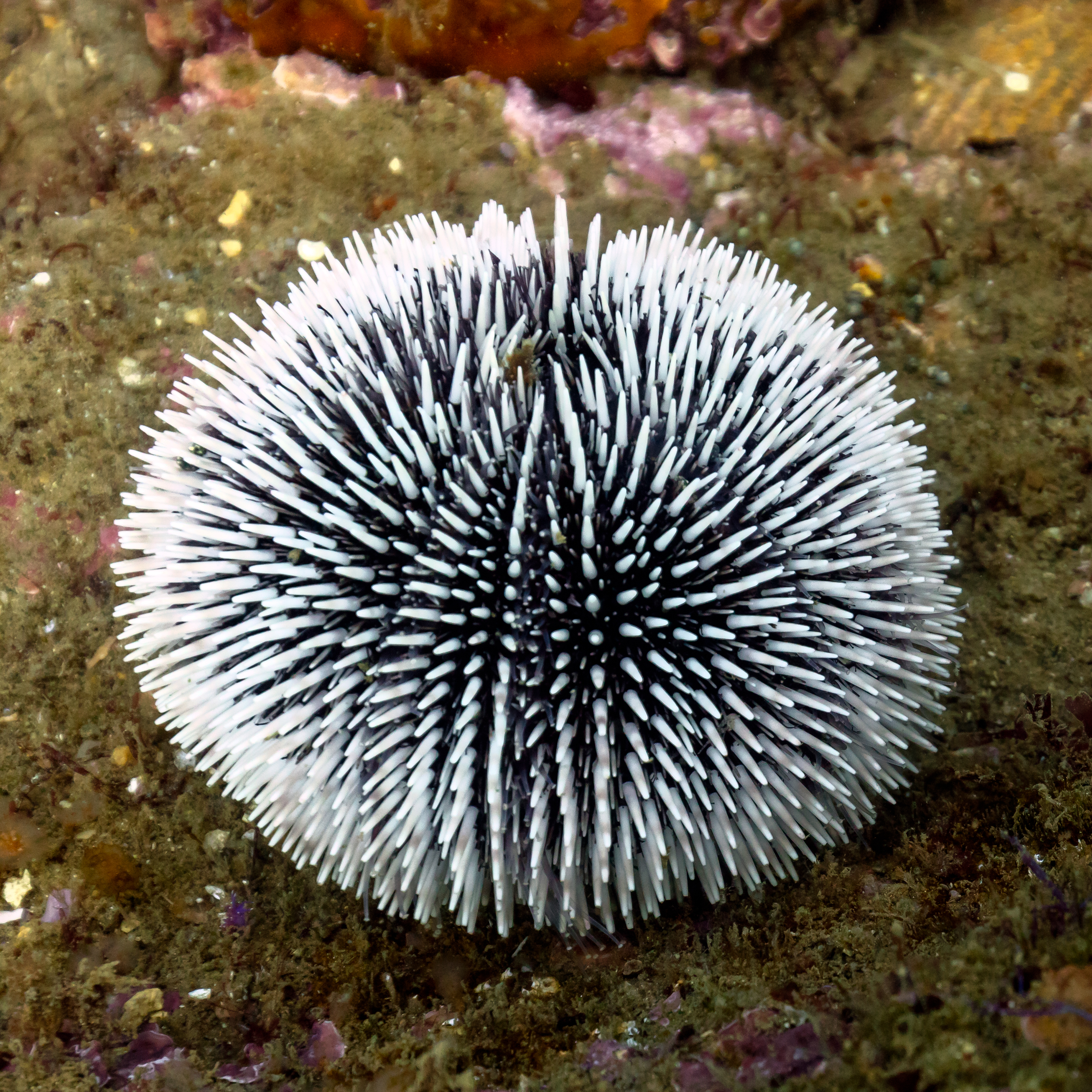
White Sphaerechinus granularis .

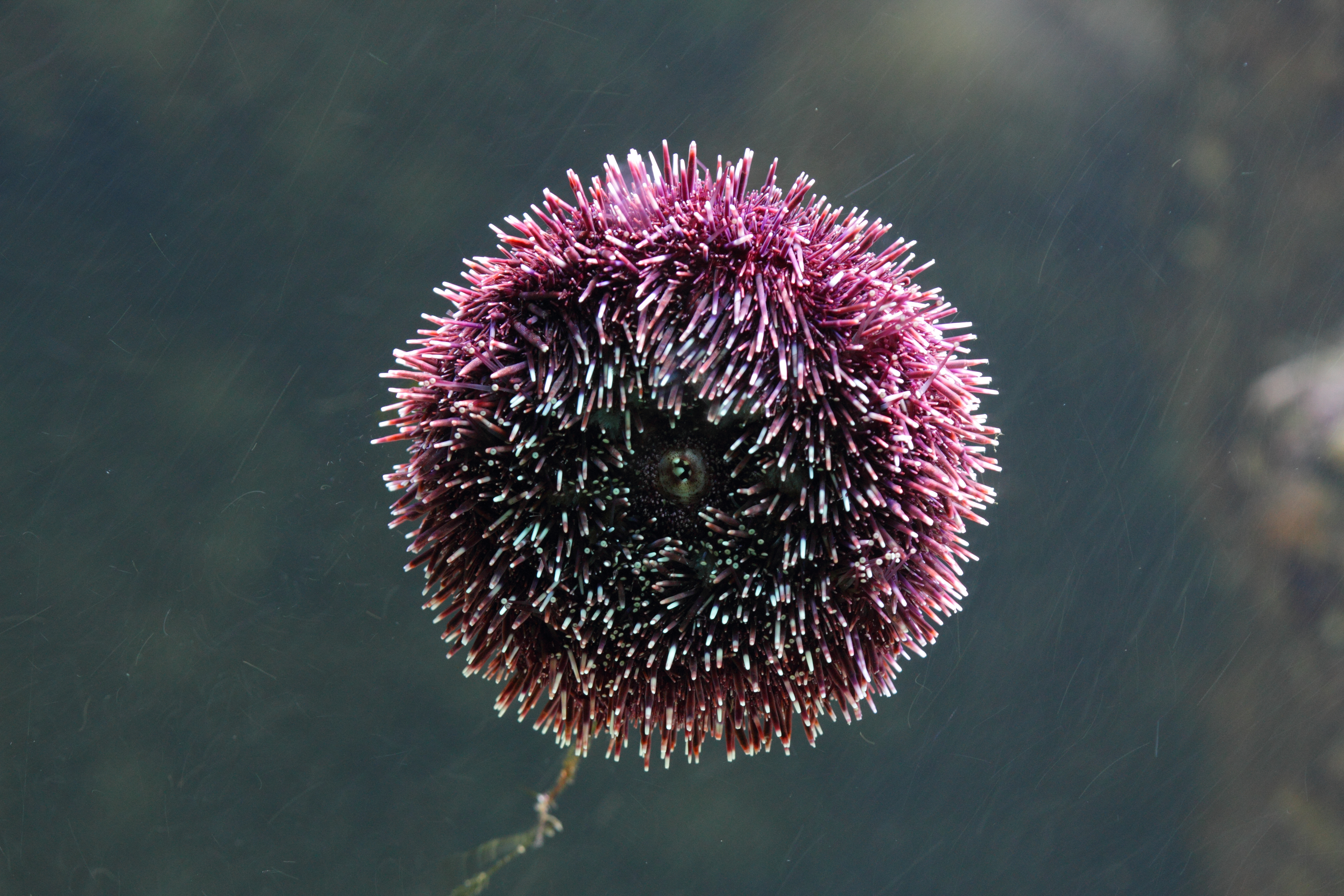
Dark pink specimen

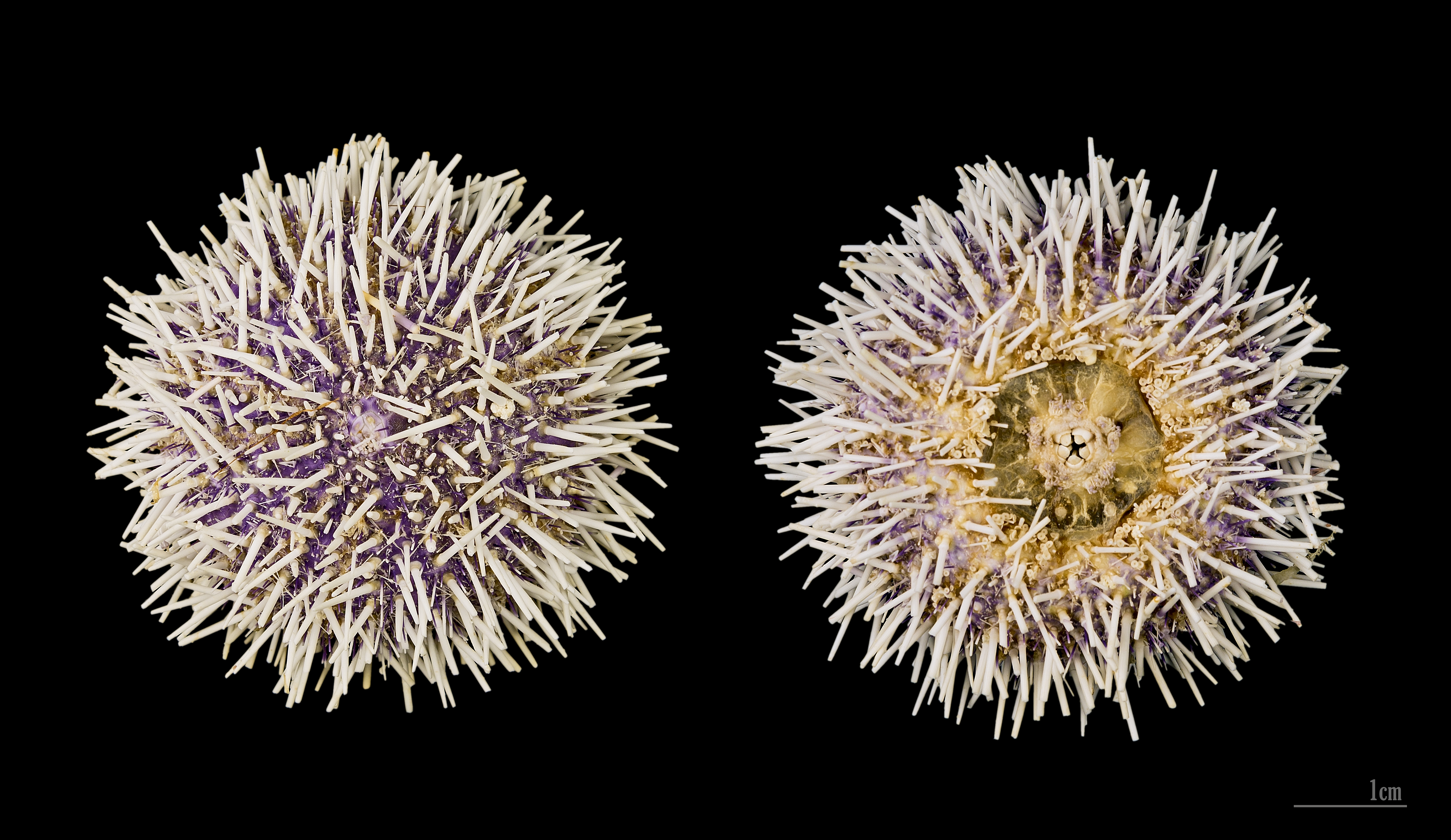
Both sides of a dried specimen. - MHNT

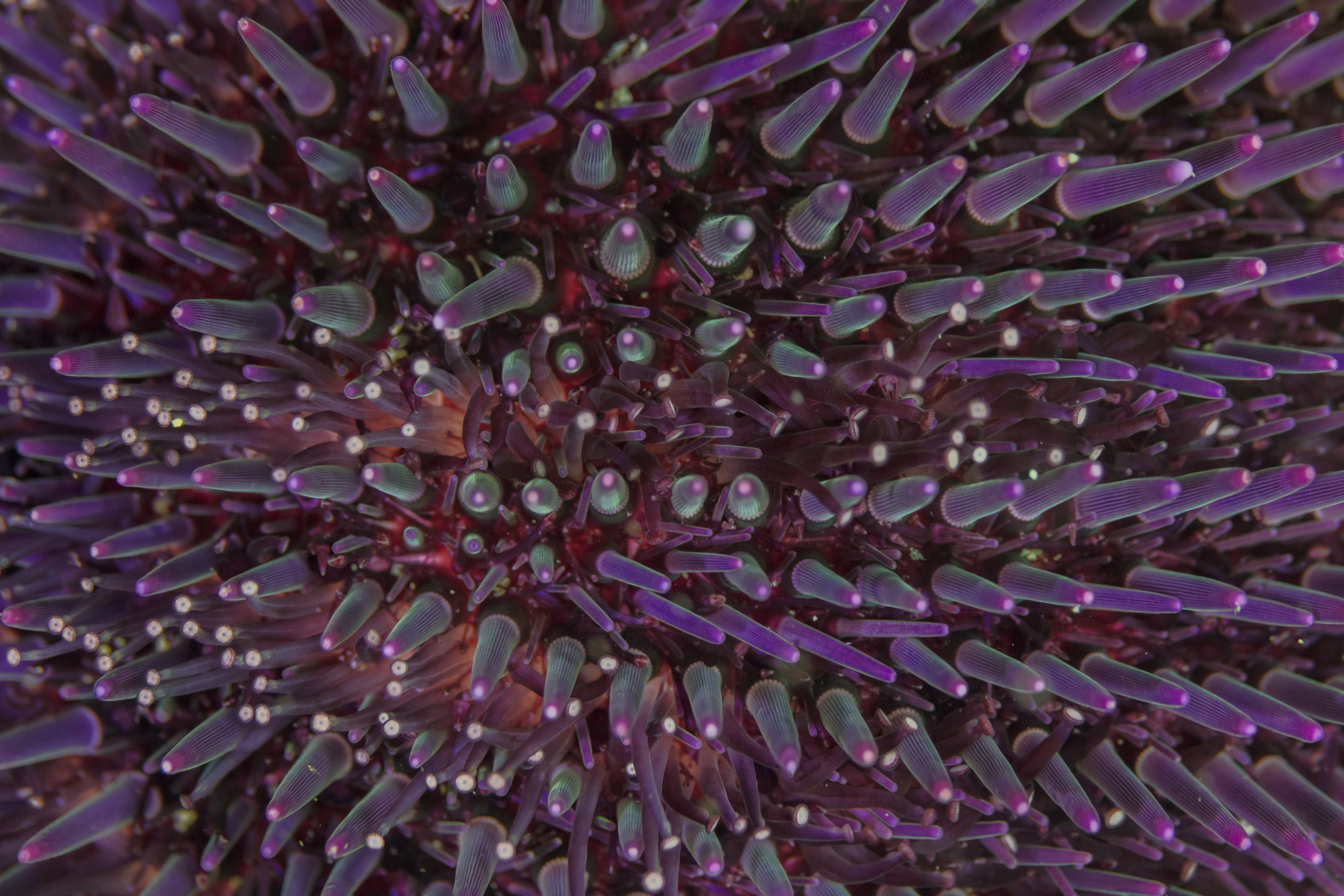
Close up

== Distribution and habitat ==
Sphaerechinus granularis is found in the Mediterranean Sea and the eastern Atlantic Ocean, from the Channel Islands south to Cape Verde and the Gulf of Guinea. It favours sheltered locations and lives on rocks covered with seaweed or gravelly substrates. It is usually found in the neritic zone down to about 30 metres (100 ft), but it is occasionally as 130 metres (430 ft). It is also found in meadows of the seagrass Posidonia oceanica.

== Biology ==
Sphaerechinus granularis often covers itself with morsels of algae and shell fragments, which are held in place by the tube feet and by the claw-like structures known as pedicellaria. It grazes on algae, especially encrusting coralline algae, seagrass blades and their epiphytic organisms and detritus.

Spawning takes place at any time of year but the peak period is spring and early summer. Eggs and sperm are liberated into the water column, where egg fertilisation takes place. The larvae are planktonic. After several moults, the echinopluteus larva settles and undergoes metamorphosis before developing into a juvenile.

== Ecology ==
In Tunisia, S. granularis is found living in association with two other species of sea urchins, Centrostephanus longispinus and Paracentrotus lividus. It is preyed upon by the starfish Marthasterias glacialis and Luidia ciliaris.

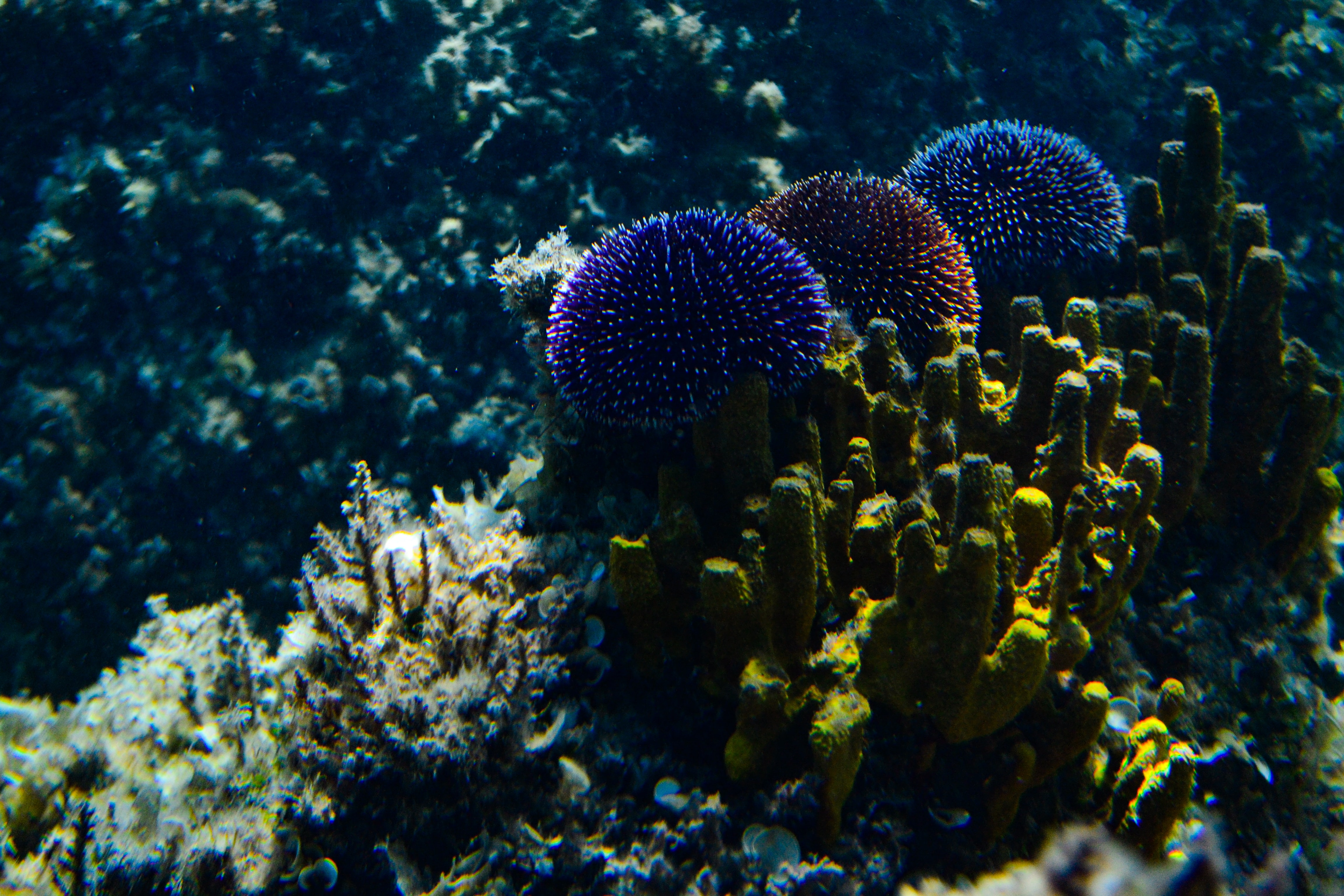
Violet sea urchins in different colors near the island of Ugljan, Croatia

== Use as food ==
The gonads of S. granularis are considered a delicacy in Italy, Provence and Catalonia.
