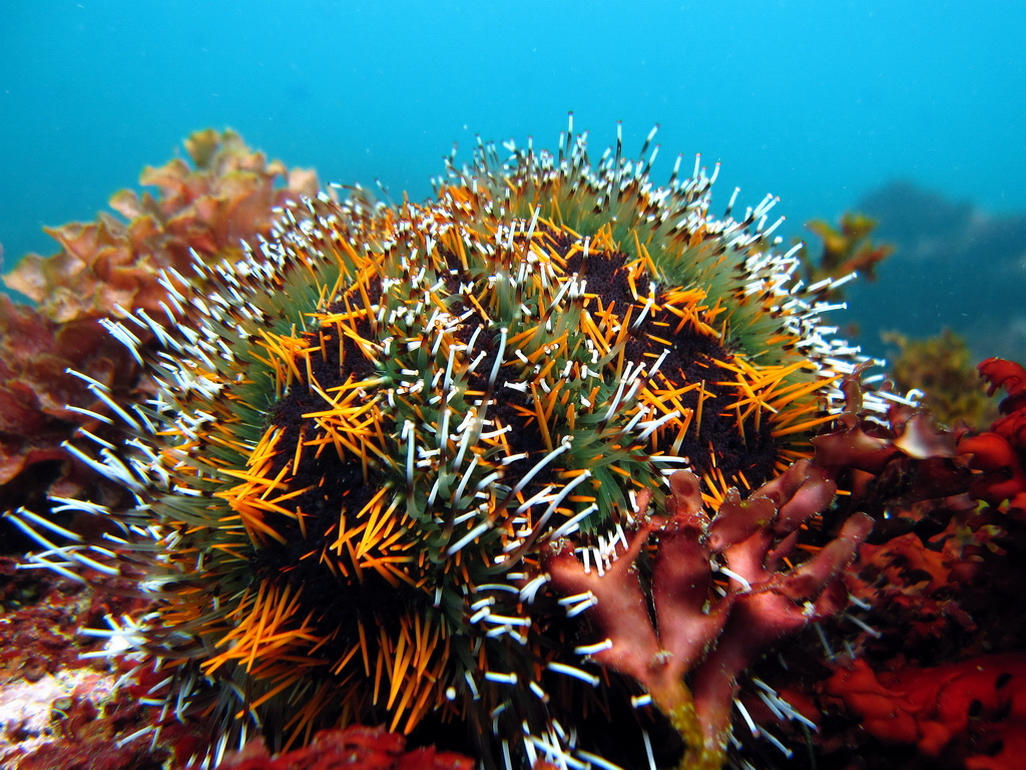

Scientific classification
- Kingdom: Animalia
- Phylum: Echinodermata
- Class: Echinoidea
- Order: Camarodonta
- Family: Toxopneustidae
- Genus: Tripneustes
- Species: T. gratilla

Binomial name
- Tripneustes gratilla (Linnaeus, 1758)

Synonyms
- Echinus gratilla

= Tripneustes gratilla =

Species of sea urchin

Tripneustes gratilla, the collector urchin or halloween urchin, is a species of sea urchin. Collector urchins are found at depths of 2 to 30 metres (7 to 100 ft) in the waters of the Indo-Pacific, Hawaii, the Red Sea, and The Bahamas. They can reach 10 to 15 centimetres (4 to 6 in) in size.

== Description ==
Collector urchins are dark in color, usually bluish-purple with white spines. The pedicles are also white, with a dark or black base. Individuals found at Green Island had orange-tipped spines. The spines of some specimens are wholly orange, while those of others are only orange-tipped or completely white. This color disappears when the individual dies or is taken out of the ocean, and is difficult to preserve. Collector urchins reach 10 to 15 centimetres (4 to 6 in) in size. Debris tends to "collect" on these urchins, hence their name.

Unlike some other sea urchins, collector urchins graze continually, day and night. They graze near the substrate, and their diet includes algae, periphyton, and seagrass. Most collector urchins feed on seagrass fronds; this has an ecological impact varying with the season and abundance of the urchins. They feed voraciously between November and January; one study found they consumed up to or in excess of half of seagrass production. On an annual basis, however, the same study concluded that about 24% of seagrass production is consumed by the collector urchin. The seagrass species grazed are mainly Thalassodendron ciliatum and Syringodim isoetifolium, but other algae may also be consumed.

Collector urchins are prey for puffer fish, octopuses, and humans.

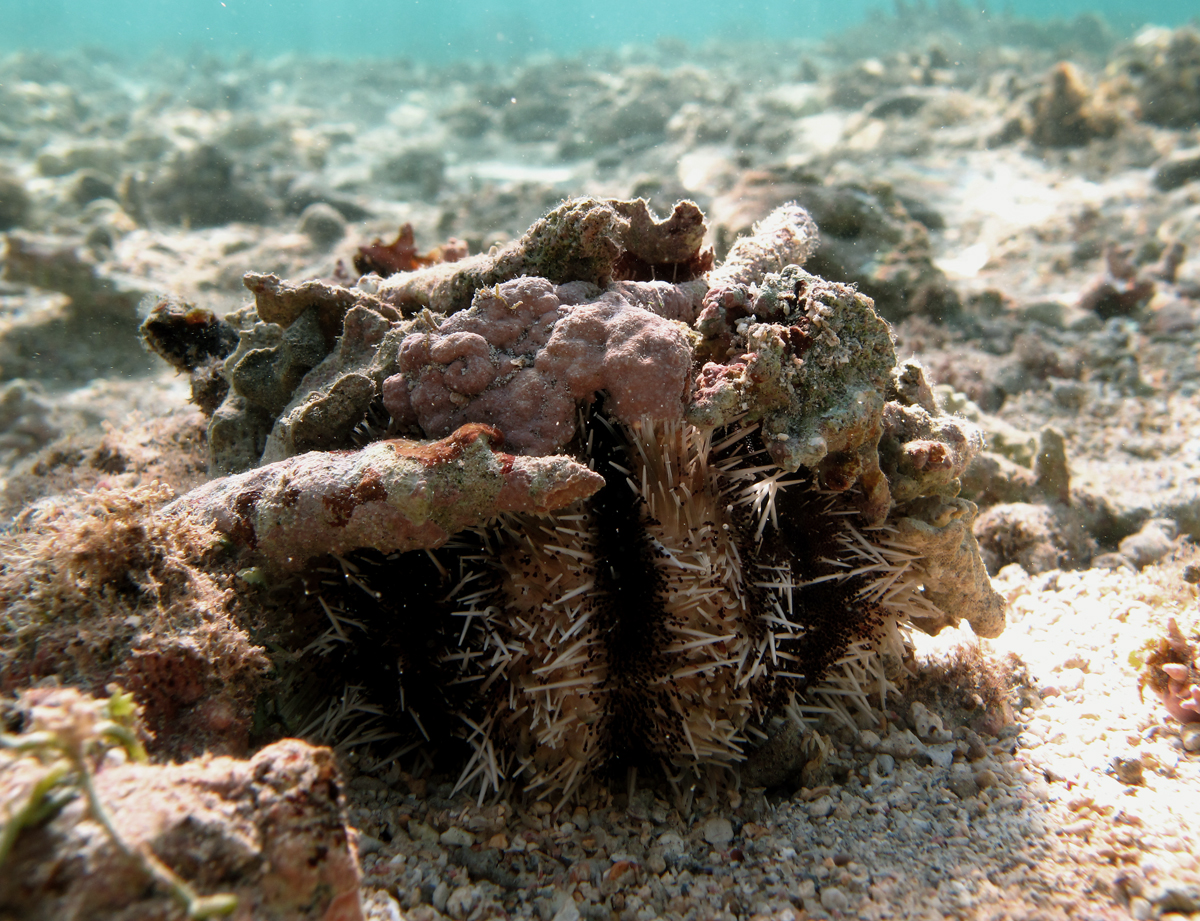
T. gratilla covered with rocks, (Réunion island).

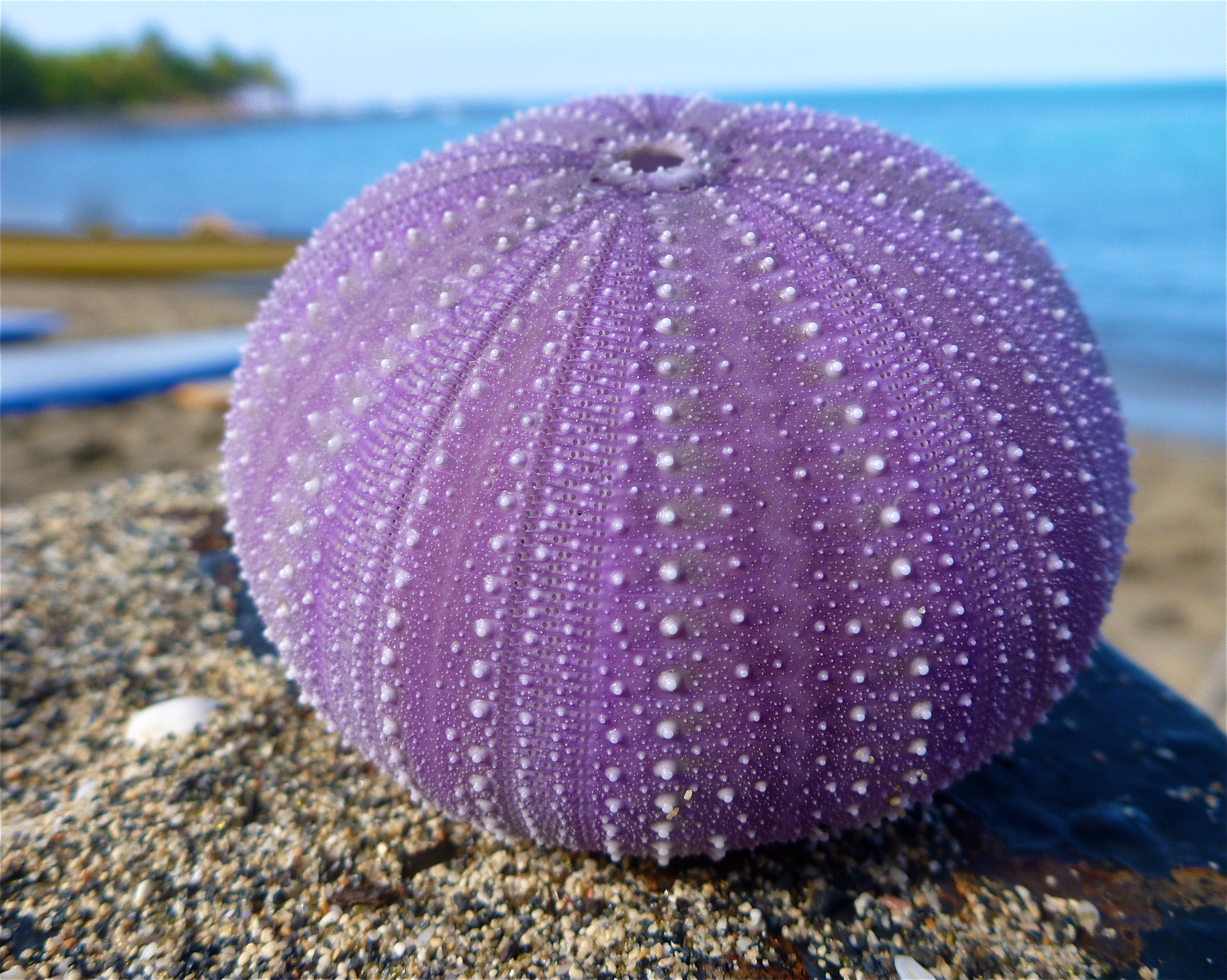
Test of T. gratilla, Hawaii.

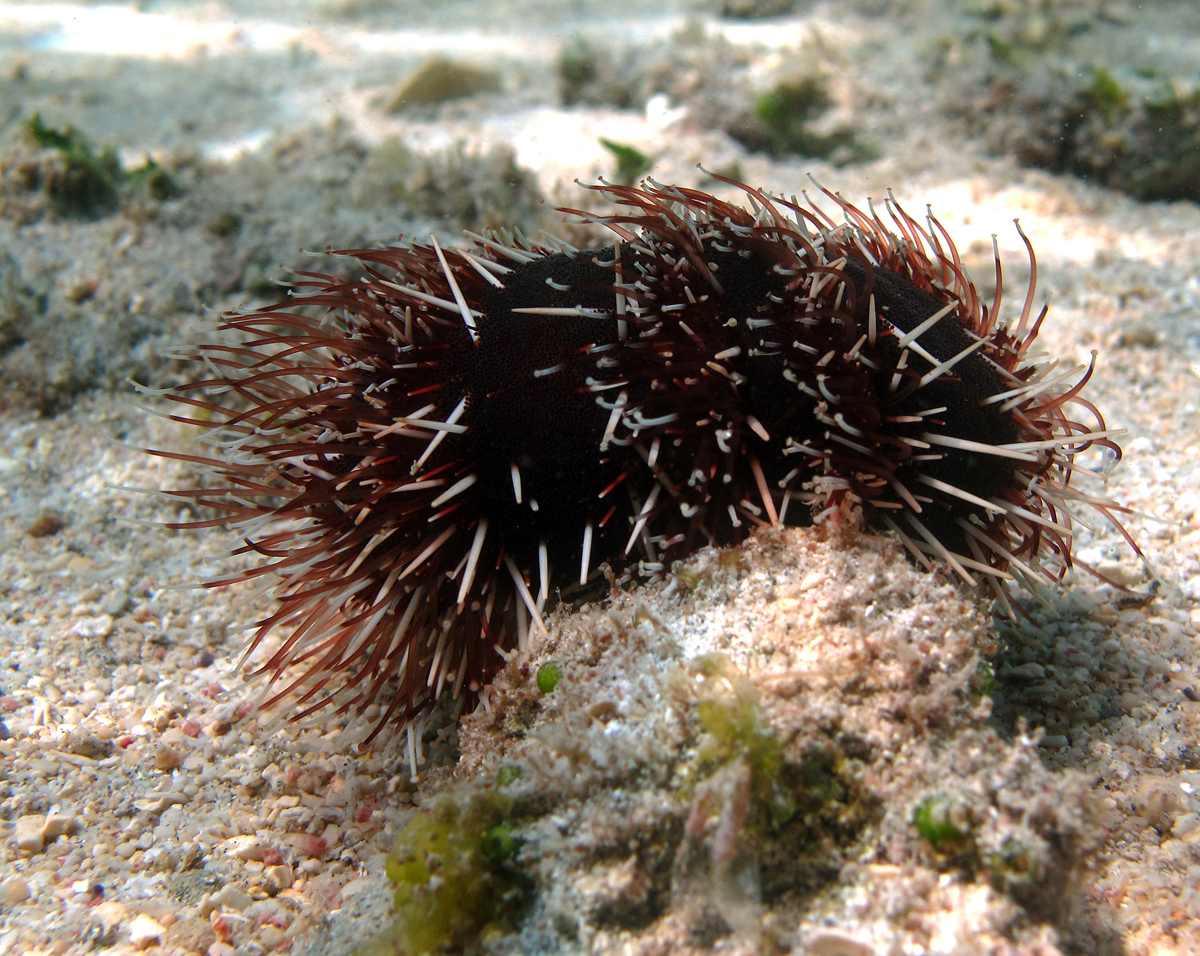
This urchin has long and obvious podia.

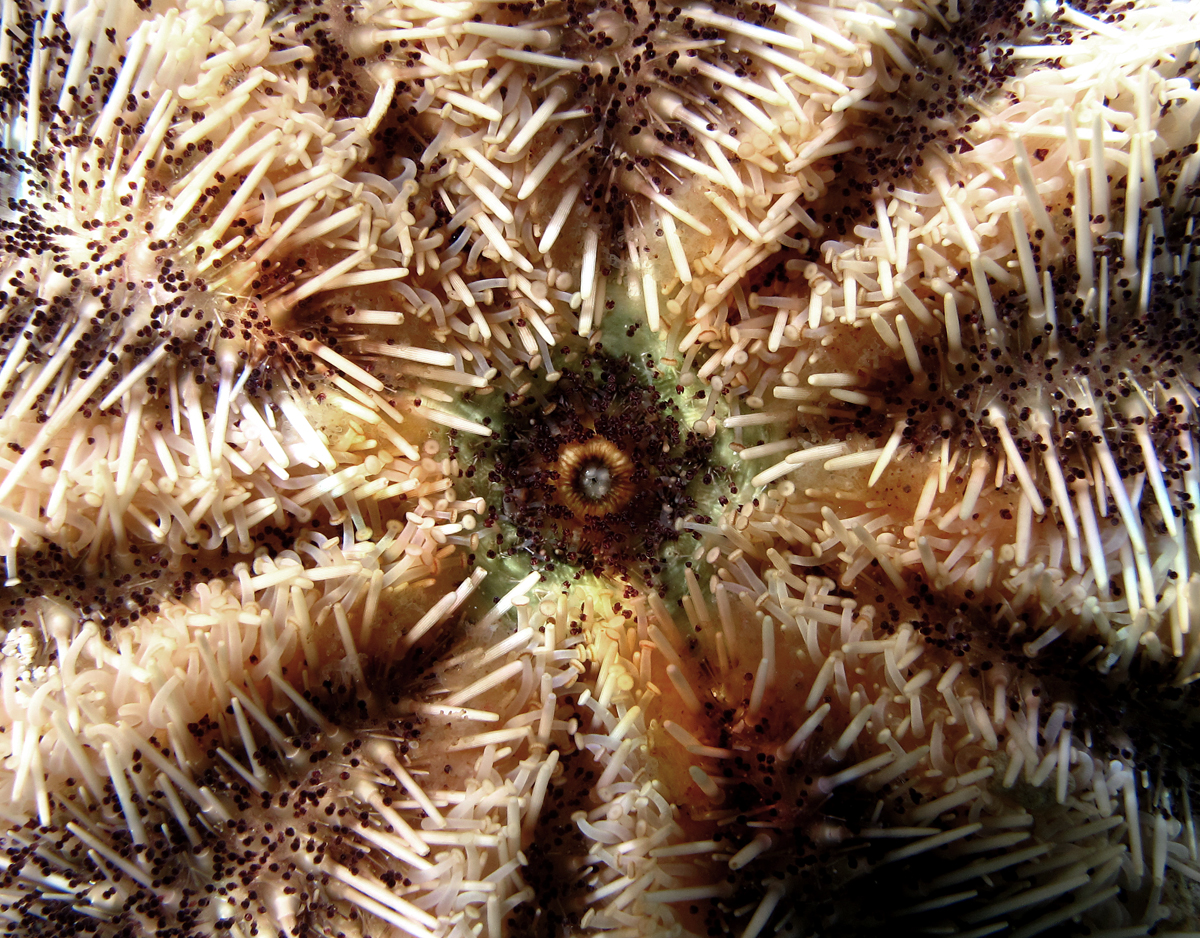
Aboral side.

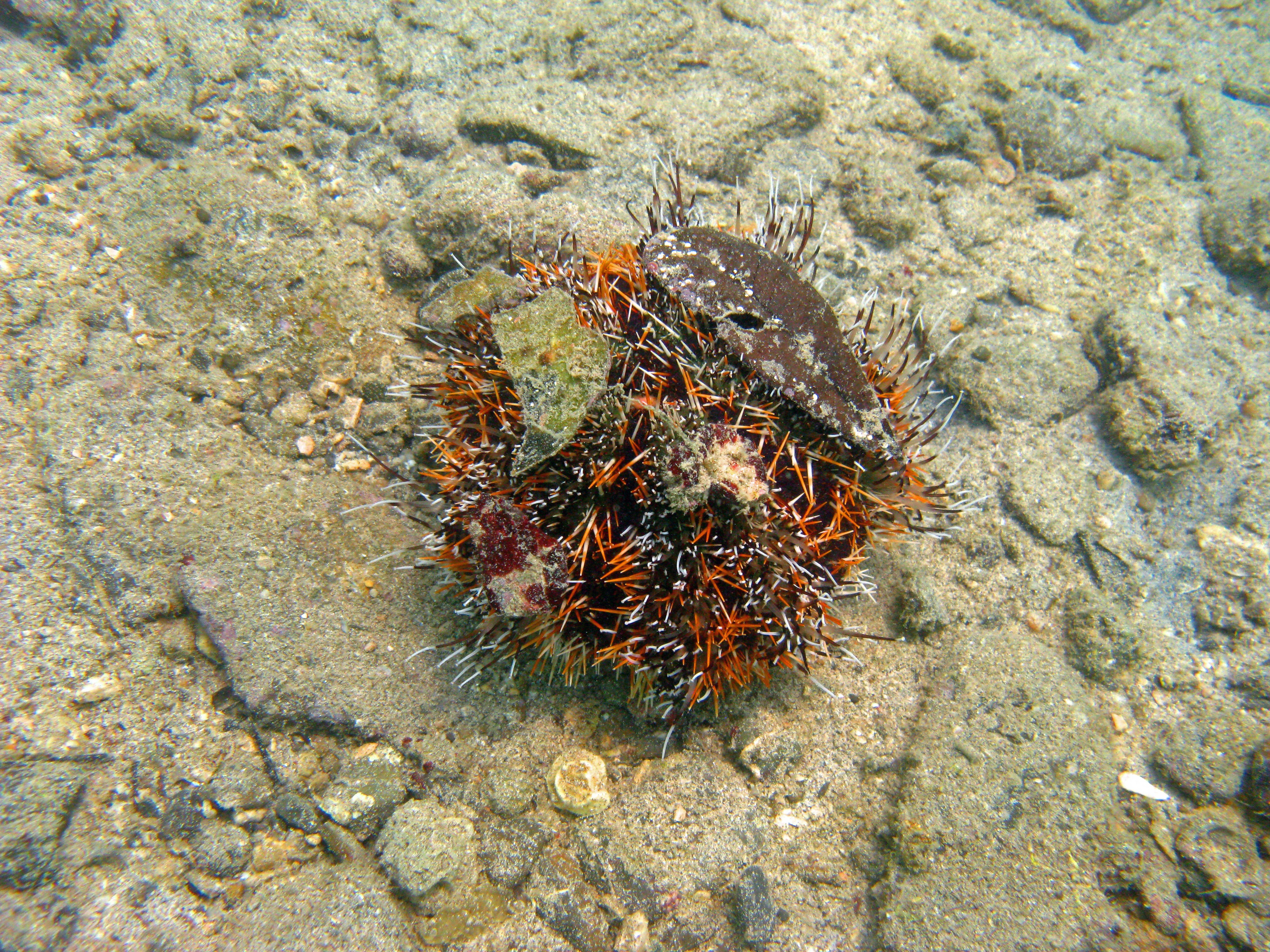
More colored specimen in Asia.

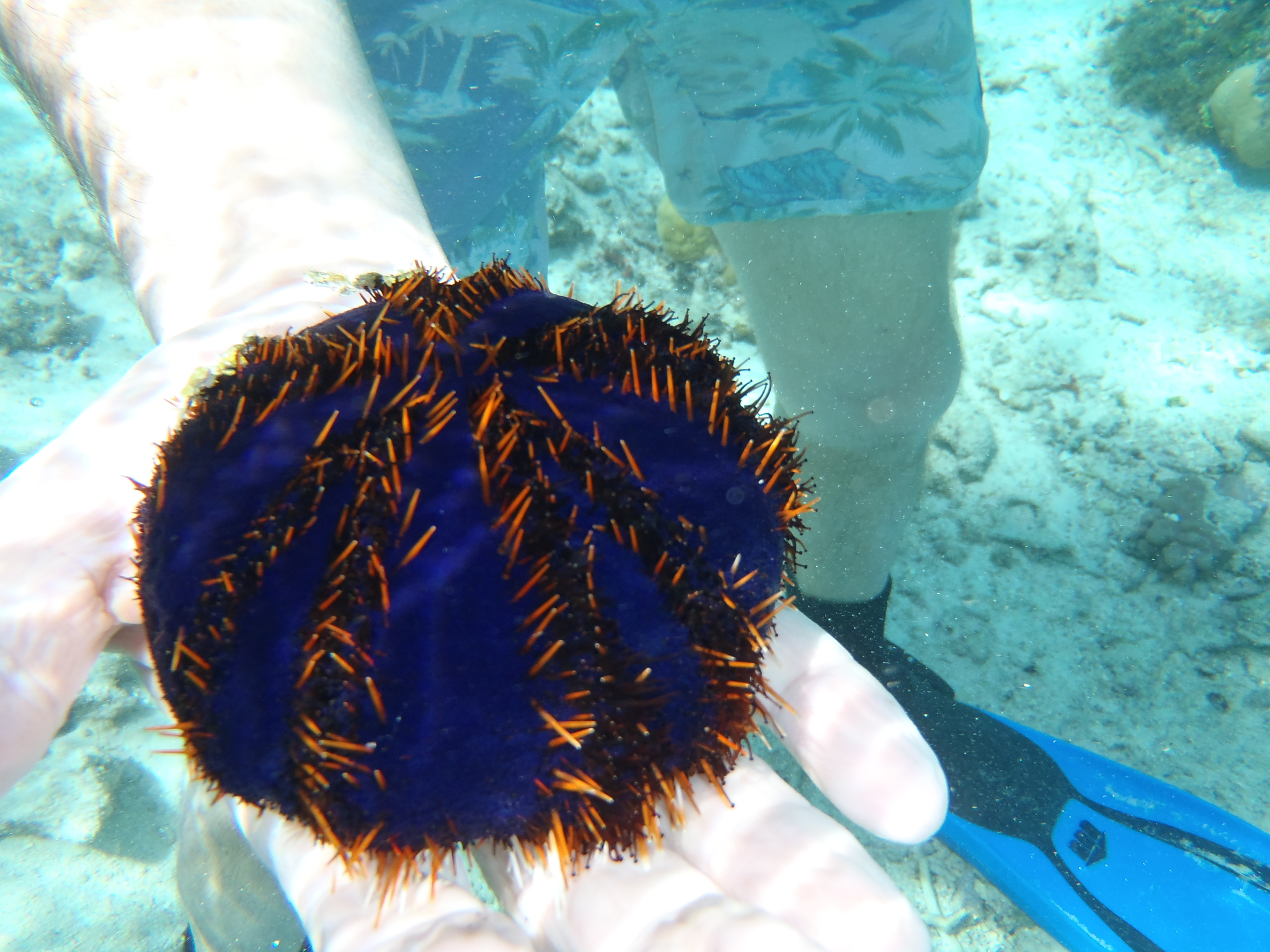
Even more colored specimen from Polynesia.

== Distribution and habitat ==
Collector urchins are found in the waters of the Indo-Pacific, Hawaii, the Red Sea, and The Bahamas. They are distributed from Mozambique to the Red Sea, westward to Hawaii and Clarion Island, eastward to Tuamotus, and as far south as Port Jackson. It also occurs at Shark Bay on the west coast of Australia and have been found in the waters of Governor's Harbor, Eleuthera Island (Bahamas). Mature collector urchins prefer open sea bottoms with some cover, but the young prefer rocky areas for concealment. Collector urchins inhabit depths of 2 to 30 metres (7 to 100 ft).

== Relationship to humans ==
Collector urchins are economically important in some parts of the world. They are edible and sometimes exploited by humans; as a result, they have become less abundant. Over the past ten years, overexploitation has caused a sharp decline in the collector urchin population.

=== Removing invasive algae ===
Hawaii state aquatic biologists, working with divers from the Hawaii Division of Aquatic Resources placed 1,000 native collector urchins on a 500 square metres (5,400 sq ft) area of reef in Kaneohe Bay on January 29, 2011. The urchins were released to help control the invasive seaweed genus Kappaphycus, also known as "smothering seaweed," which has overrun local coral. Tripneustes gratilla stays on the reef and is an effective algae grazer.

The urchins were bred at Anuenue Fisheries Research Center from about a million larvae. The larvae produced 25,000 specimens that reached at least 15 millimetres (0.6 in) in diameter in about five months. The delicate young had to be kept suspended in the water column for weeks after hatching. The project intends to release 10,000 to 25,000 urchins per month.

Kaneohe Bay is the only barrier reef system in the United States. The alien seaweed was brought to Hawaii for commercial applications such as keeping ice chunks out of ice cream. It escaped when the industry failed.

For years, the state used a marine vacuum pump to remove the algae, at one time removing 10,000 pounds (4,500 kg). In 2009, the scientists gathered urchins from other parts of the state and released them at Kaneohe Bay. A year later, they found the urchins had successfully kept the seaweed down.

== See also ==
- Tripneustes ventricosus (related species in the Atlantic)
