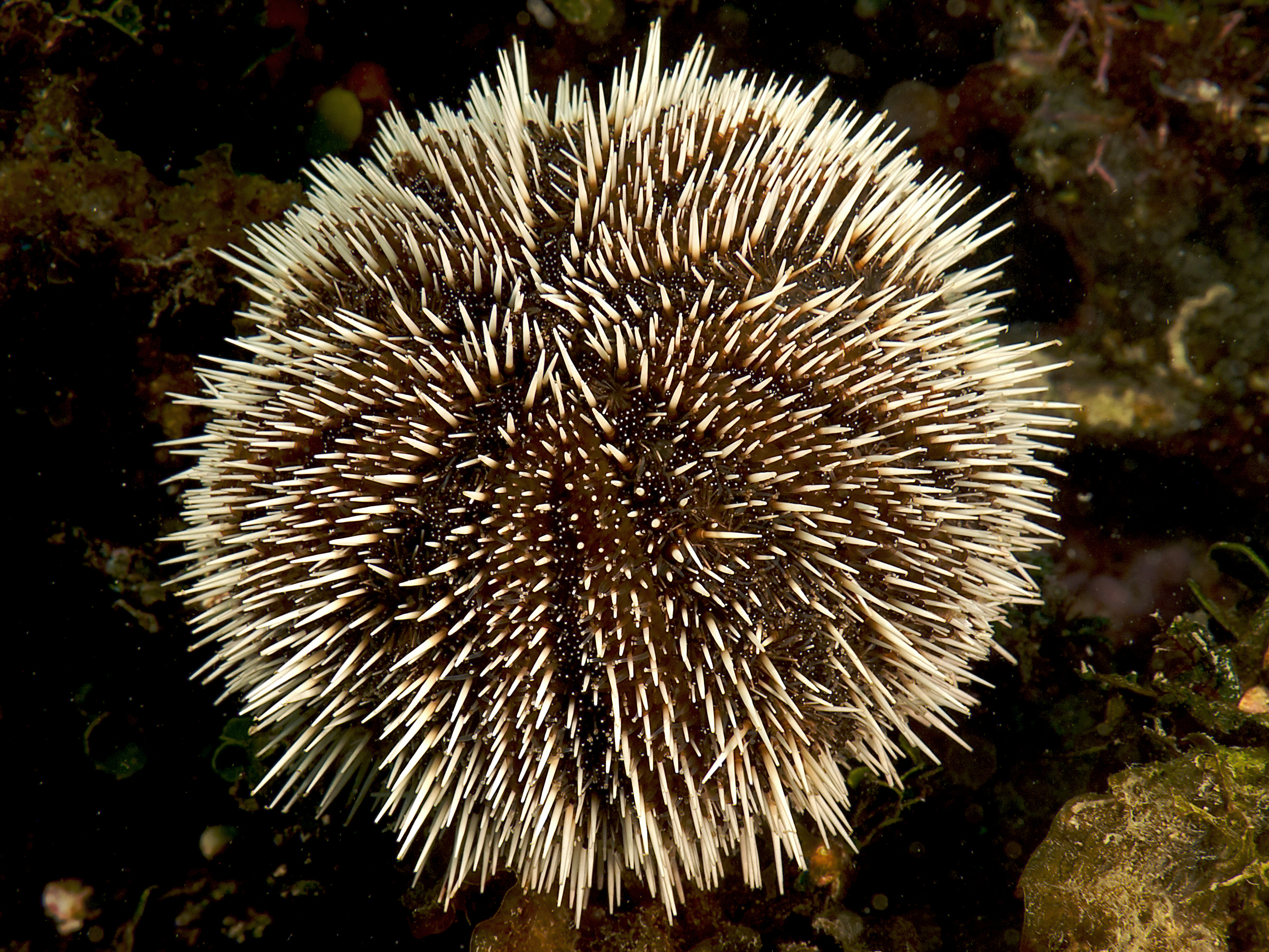

Scientific classification
- Kingdom: Animalia
- Phylum: Echinodermata
- Class: Echinoidea
- Order: Camarodonta
- Family: Toxopneustidae
- Genus: Tripneustes
- Species: T. ventricosus

Binomial name
- Tripneustes ventricosus (Lamarck, 1816)

Synonyms
- Echinus ventricosus Lamarck, 1816; Heliechinus gouldii Girard, 1850; Hipponoe esculenta Agassiz, 1872; Tripneustes esculenta (Agassiz, 1872); Tripneustes esculentus (Agassiz, 1872)

= Tripneustes ventricosus =

Species of sea urchin

Tripneustes ventricosus, commonly called the West Indian sea egg or white sea urchin, is a species of sea urchin. It is common in the Caribbean Sea, the Bahamas and Florida and may be found at depths of less than 10 metres (33 ft).

== Description ==
The test of the West Indian sea egg is dark in color, usually black, dark purple or reddish brown, with white spines 1 to 2 centimetres (0.39 to 0.79 inches) long. The test can reach 10 to 15 centimetres (3.9 to 5.9 in) in diameter. It is often covered with pieces of seagrass, fragments of shell and other debris in a manner similar to the closely related Tripneustes gratilla. These decorations are held in place by tube feet among the spines and are believed to provide protection from the intense sunlight that penetrates the shallow water.

== Distribution and habitat ==
Small West Indian sea egg found in the ocean in San Juan, Puerto Rico

The West Indian sea egg is found in shallow parts of the western Atlantic Ocean, the Caribbean Sea and Gulf of Mexico. Its range extends from Bermuda, the Carolinas and Florida to Belize, Venezuela and Brazil and also includes the west coast of Africa and Ascension Island. It seldom occurs in water deeper than 10 metres (33 ft). It is found in seagrass meadows, in rubble areas and on shallow rocky reefs. Young sea urchins conceal themselves in crevices and under rocks during the day but larger individuals stay out in the open.

== Biology ==
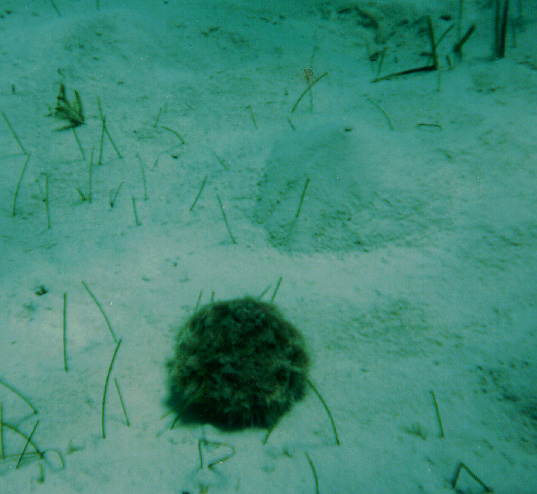
Large specimen next to a shrimp mound, Grahams Harbor, San Salvador Island, Bahamas

The West Indian sea egg feeds on algae but tends to avoid the crustose, highly calcified coralline algae.

Ripe gonads were found in urchins at any time of year but breeding probably takes place mostly in the summer. Male and female urchins liberate gametes into the sea where fertilisation takes place. The eggs soon hatch into larvae which are planktonic. These develop through a number of larval stages over the course of about one month before settling on the seabed and undergoing metamorphosis into juveniles. Young urchin recruits in Barbados are thought to have originated off the coast of South America. Various bottom feeding fish feed on the young sea urchins. In Jamaica, the queen triggerfish, (Balistes vetula), is the main predator. During their first year, young urchins increased their diameter by about 7 millimetres (0.28 in) a month. Growth slowed thereafter and halted completely after maturity was reached while the gonads were ripening. After liberation of the gametes, growth restarted.

== Uses ==
The gonads of the West Indian sea egg are traditionally consumed in the West Indies and there is an important fishery in Barbados. Urchins are collected by skin diving and it used to be possible to collect a thousand in a few hours. In order to conserve stocks, a closed period was introduced during the breeding season (May to August) during which no sea urchins were allowed to be taken. Despite this, sea urchin numbers have declined during the late twentieth century and they are now uncommon and the fishery non-viable. The cause of this population collapse is thought to be overfishing, though pollution and disease may have played a part. The sea urchins have become rare in the most easily fished locations and are still common in more remote places. Attempts are being made to raise urchin larvae in the laboratory and restock depleted areas.
