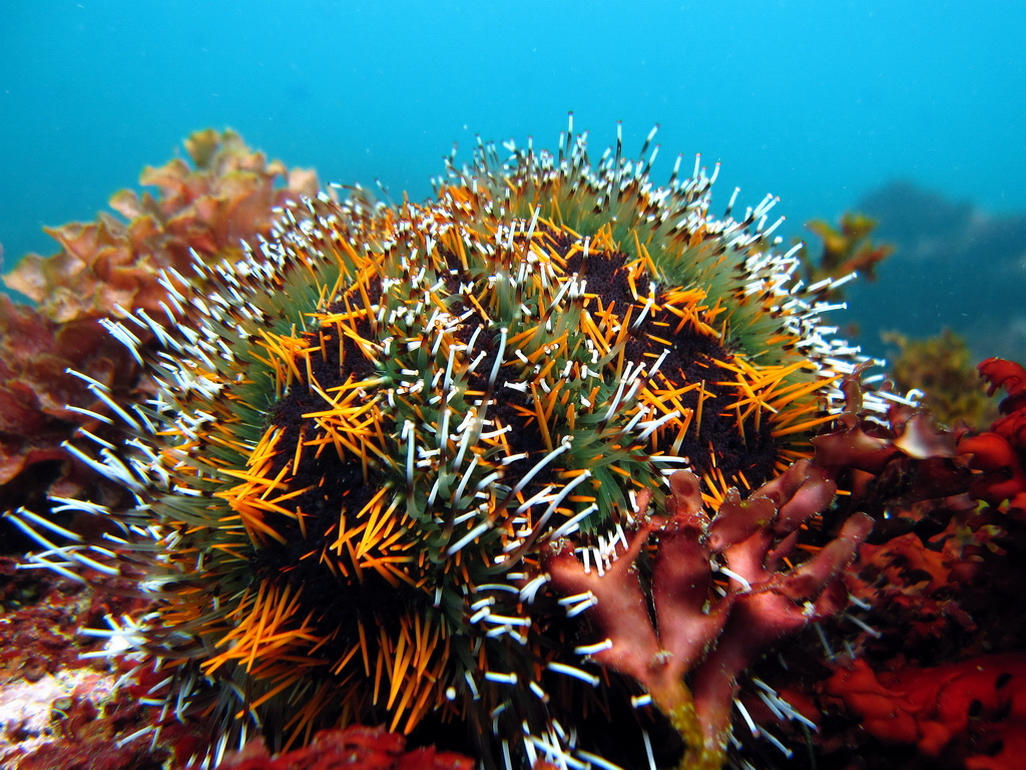
- Tripneustes gratilla

Scientific classification
- Kingdom: Animalia
- Phylum: Echinodermata
- Class: Echinoidea
- Order: Camarodonta
- Infraorder: Echinidea
- Family: Toxopneustidae; Troschel, 1872

= Toxopneustidae =

Family of echinoderms

Toxopneustidae is a family of globular sea urchins in the class Echinoidea.

== Characteristics ==
All Camarodonts have imperforate tubercles and compound ambulacral plates. In addition, the Toxopneustids are characterised by the peristome, or opening through the test, having a sharp margin with the buccal notches being prominent. The tubercles lack the crenulations or ring of cog-like structures that articulate with the spines in certain other families. The Aristotle's lantern, or jaw apparatus, has the keeled teeth and the epiphyses united above the foramen magnum, the V-shaped gap between the hemipyramids that support the lantern's tooth.

== Genera ==
- Goniopneustes Duncan, 1889
- Gymnechinus Mortensen, 1903b
- Lytechinus A. Agassiz, 1863
- Nudechinus H.L. Clark, 1912
- Oligophyma Pomel, 1869
- Pseudoboletia Troschel, 1869
- Schizechinus Pomel, 1869
- Scoliechinus Arnold & H.L. Clark, 1927
- Sphaerechinus Desor, 1856
- Toxopneustes L. Agassiz, 1841b
- Tripneustes L. Agassiz, 1841b
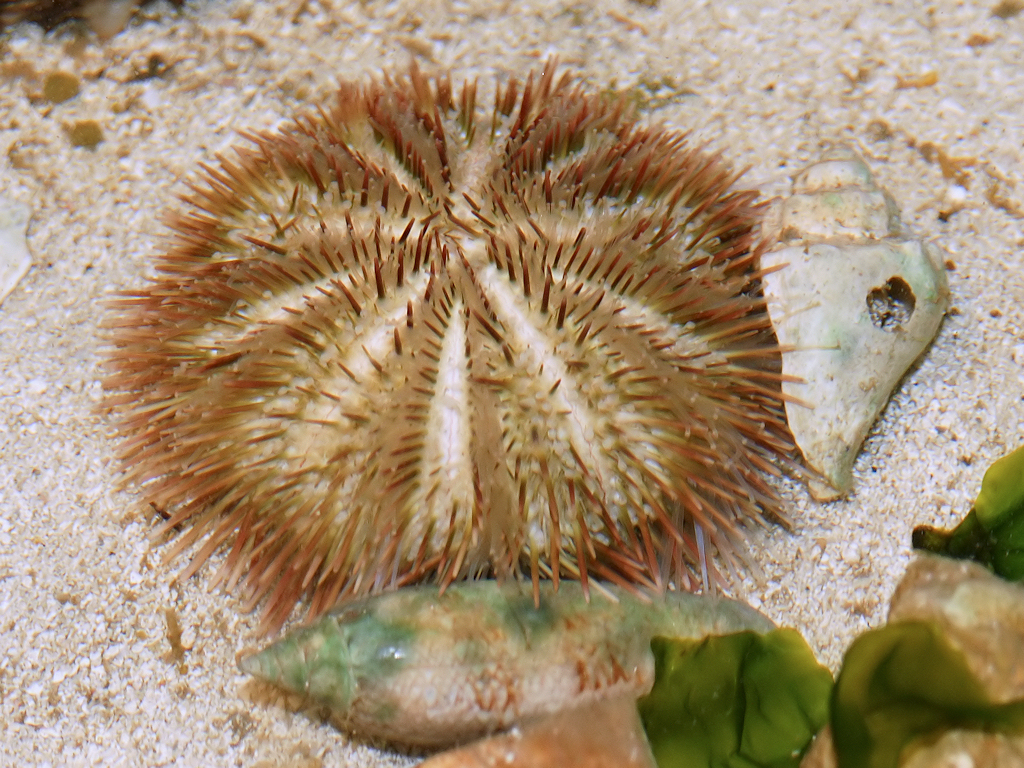
Lytechinus variegatus

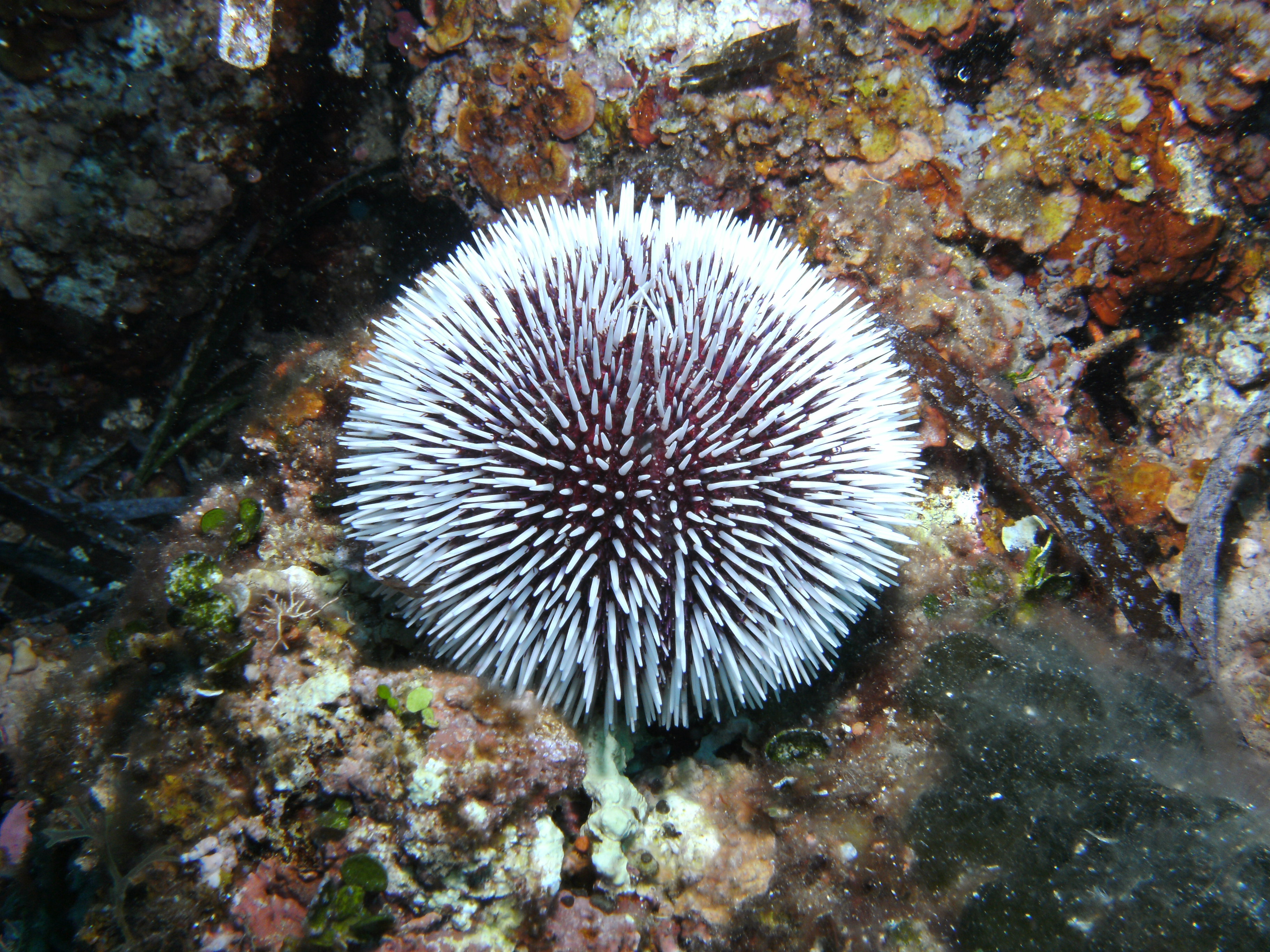
Sphaerechinus granularis

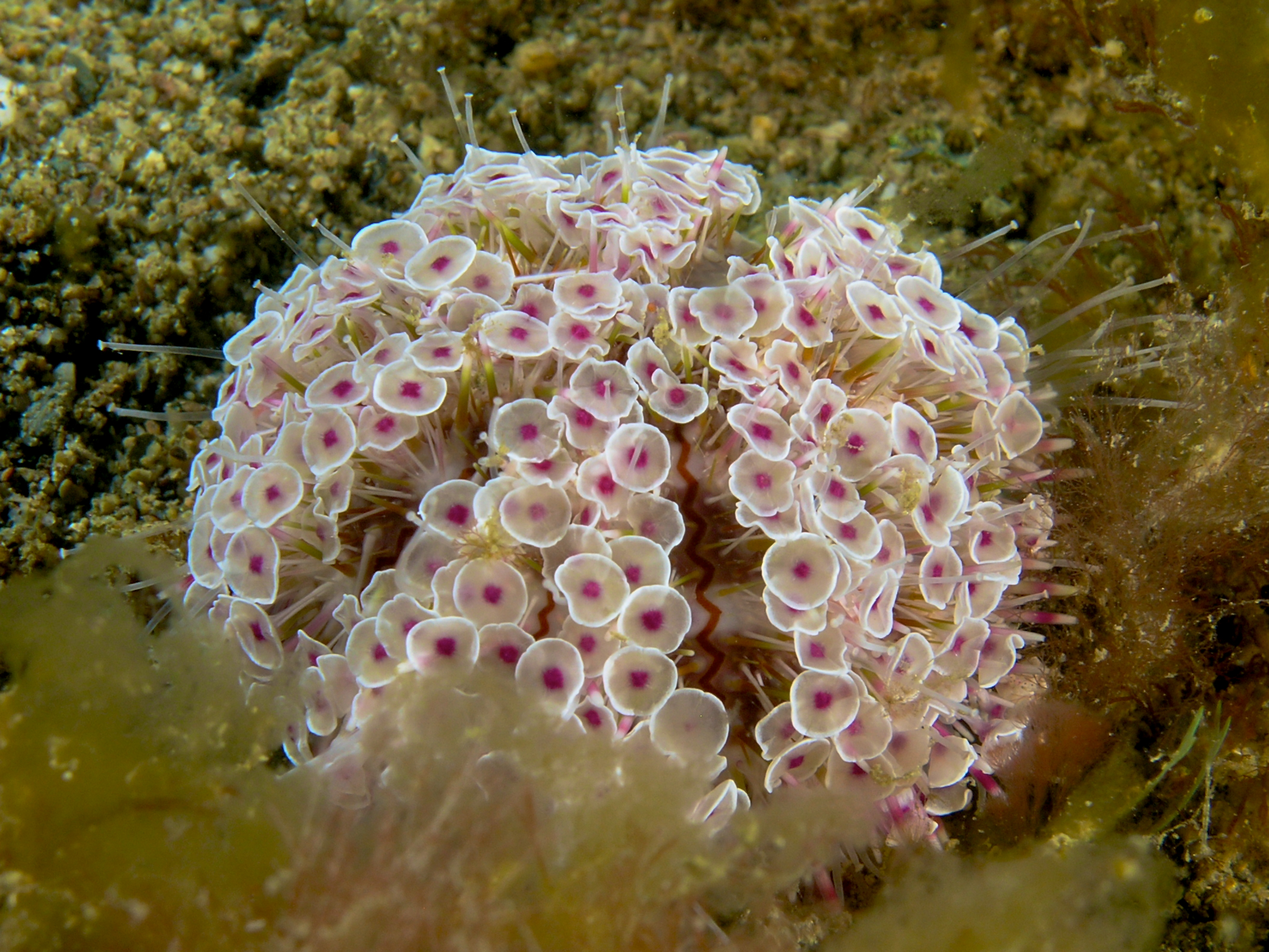
Toxopneustes pileolus

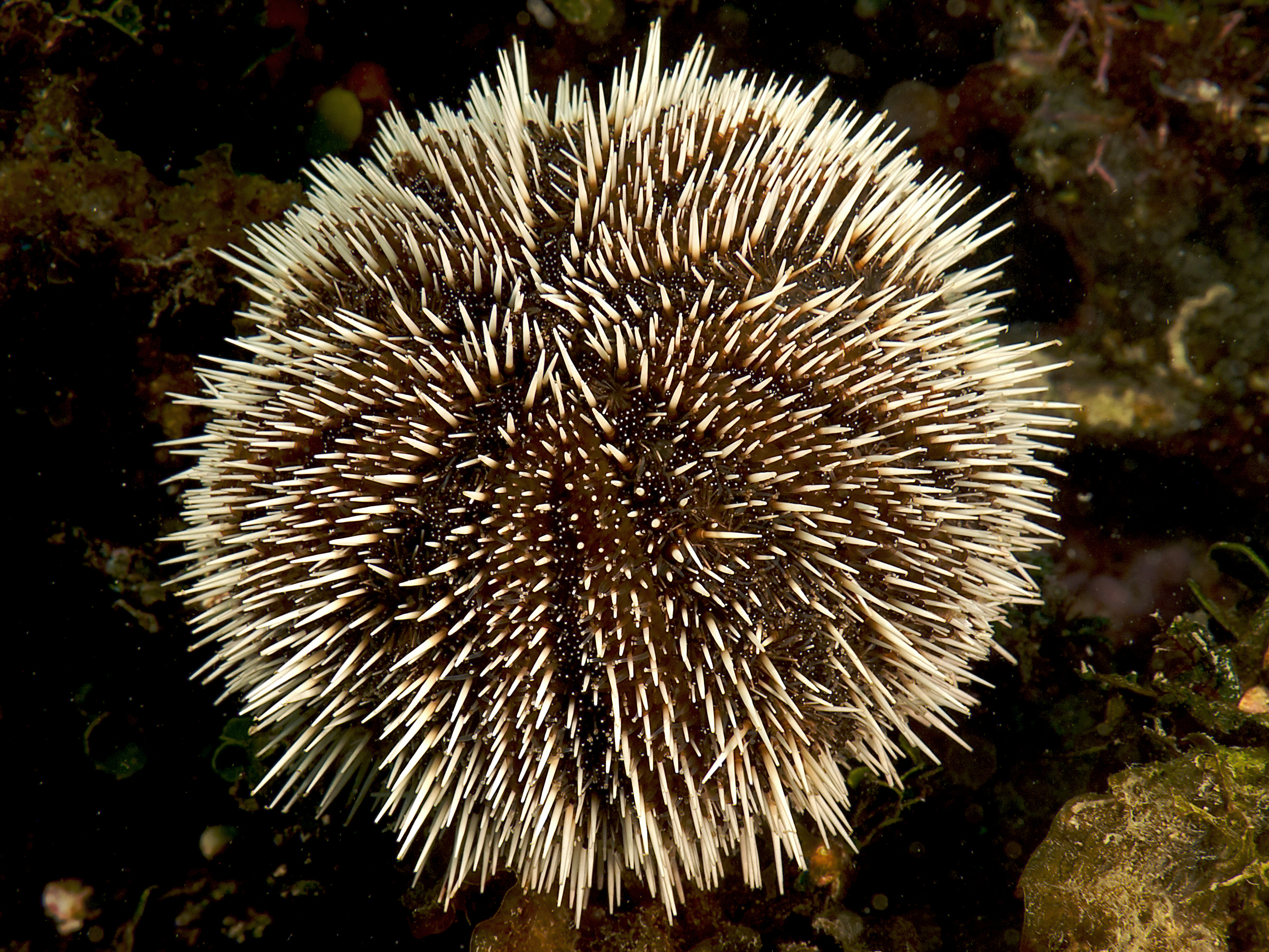
Tripneustes ventricosus

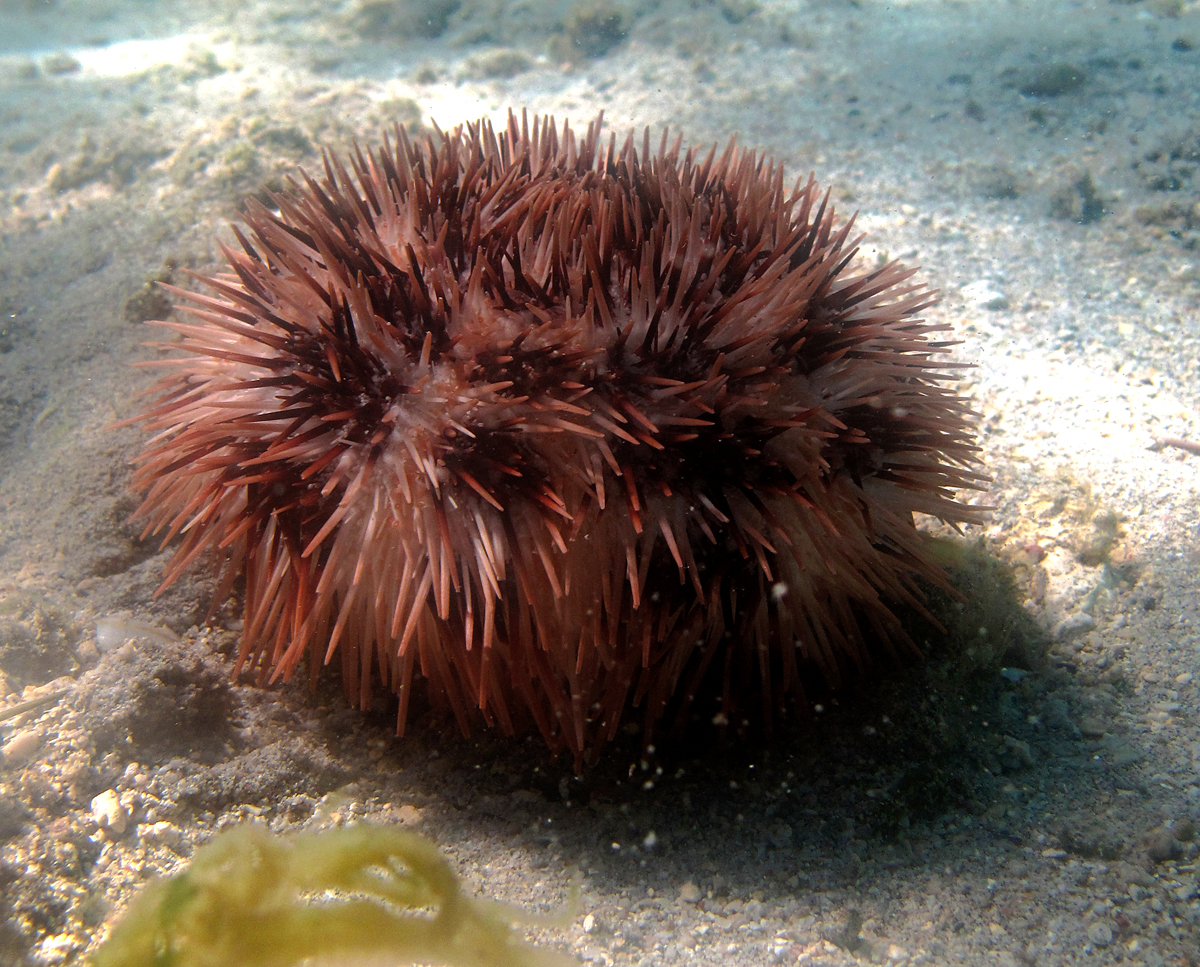
Pseudoboletia maculata
