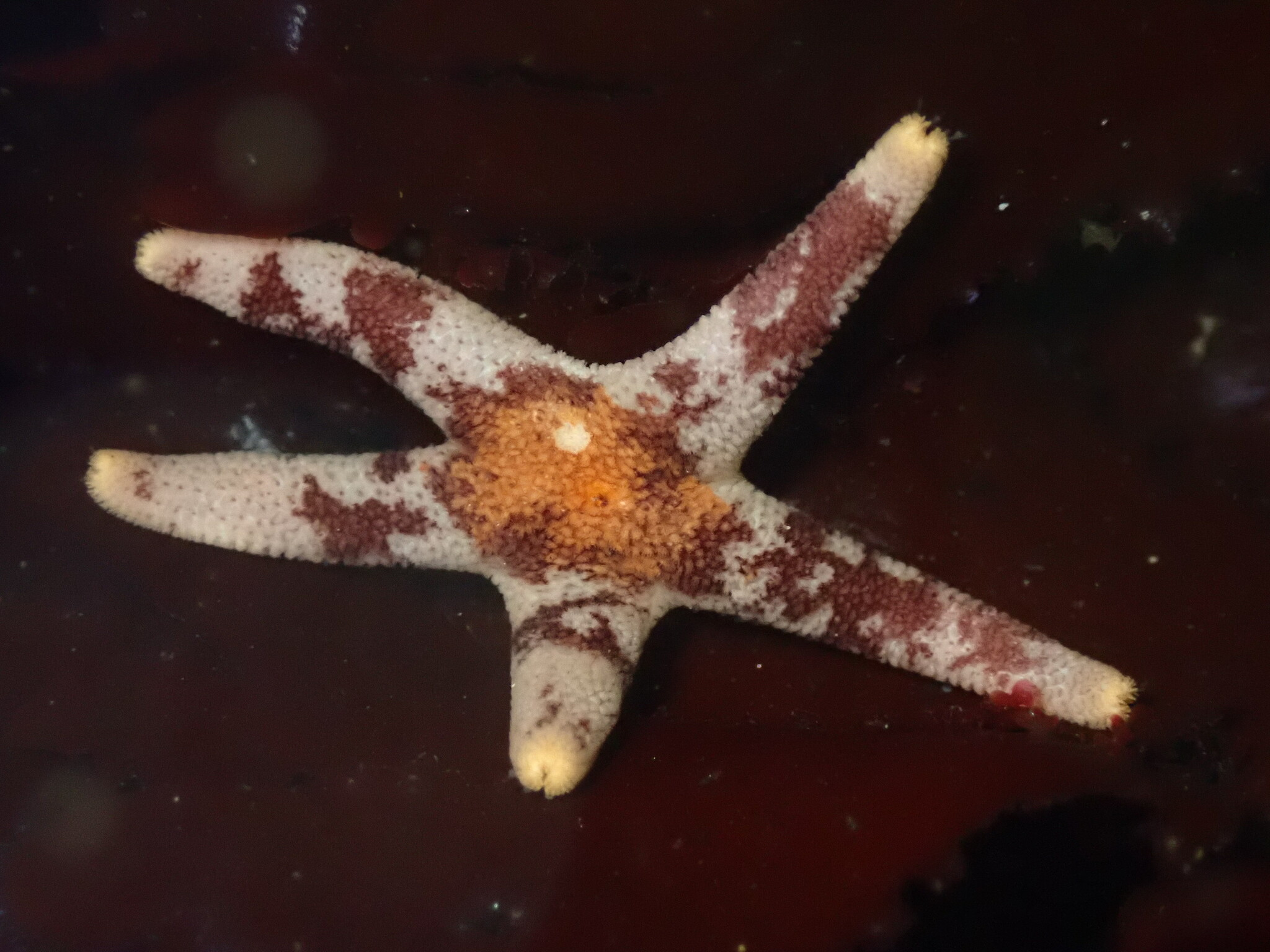

Scientific classification
- Kingdom: Animalia
- Phylum: Echinodermata
- Class: Asteroidea
- Order: Spinulosida
- Family: Echinasteridae
- Genus: Henricia
- Species: H. pumila

Binomial name
- Henricia pumila Eernisse, Strathmann & Strathmann, 2010

= Henricia pumila =

Species of starfish

Henricia pumila, commonly known as the dwarf mottled henricia, is a species of blood star, a starfish in the family Echinasteridae.

== Taxonomy ==
Previously considered conspecific with Henricia leviuscula, H. pumila was officially recognized as a separate species in 2010. Its small adult size, external brooding method of reproduction, and details in its morphology, such as its mottled appearance, distinguish it from H. leviuscula.

Its specific epithet, pumila, comes from the Latin for "dwarf".

== Distribution ==
H. pumila occurs in the cool, shallow waters of the eastern Pacific Ocean, ranging along the North American coast from near Sitka, Alaska, to Ensenada, Baja California. It is much less common in the Southern Californian stretch of its range, with only a handful of sightings along the coasts of the Channel Islands, Santa Barbara, and San Diego. H. pumila is often observed in the low intertidal, where it can be spotted in tide pools at low tide.

== Description ==
The dwarf mottled henricia typically has five short, yet slender arms (also called rays) which evenly taper to a blunt tip. Four- or six-armed individuals may occur, but are rare. The aboral (dorsal) side of its body ranges from orange, reddish orange, or purplish red in color, mottled with pale orange, cream, or lavender—its oral (ventral) side is yellow or cream. Its aboral surface is dotted with pseudopaxillae (columnar skeletal plates which are topped with small spines) which bear brush-like clusters of crystalline spines, lending the dwarf mottled henricia a textured appearance. Like other starfishes, H. pumila locomotes using tube feet.

== Ecology ==
=== Reproduction ===
The dwarf mottled henricia is a brooding species which has been observed brooding its young from January to April. It is assumed that H. pumila has distinct sexes, but it is possible it may display hermaphroditism in its tissues, as seen in some other brooding marine invertebrates. Once the eggs are shed through the oral gonopores, the brooding parent spirals its arms around a raised oral disc, under which the embryos are brooded until they emerge as free-crawling juveniles.
