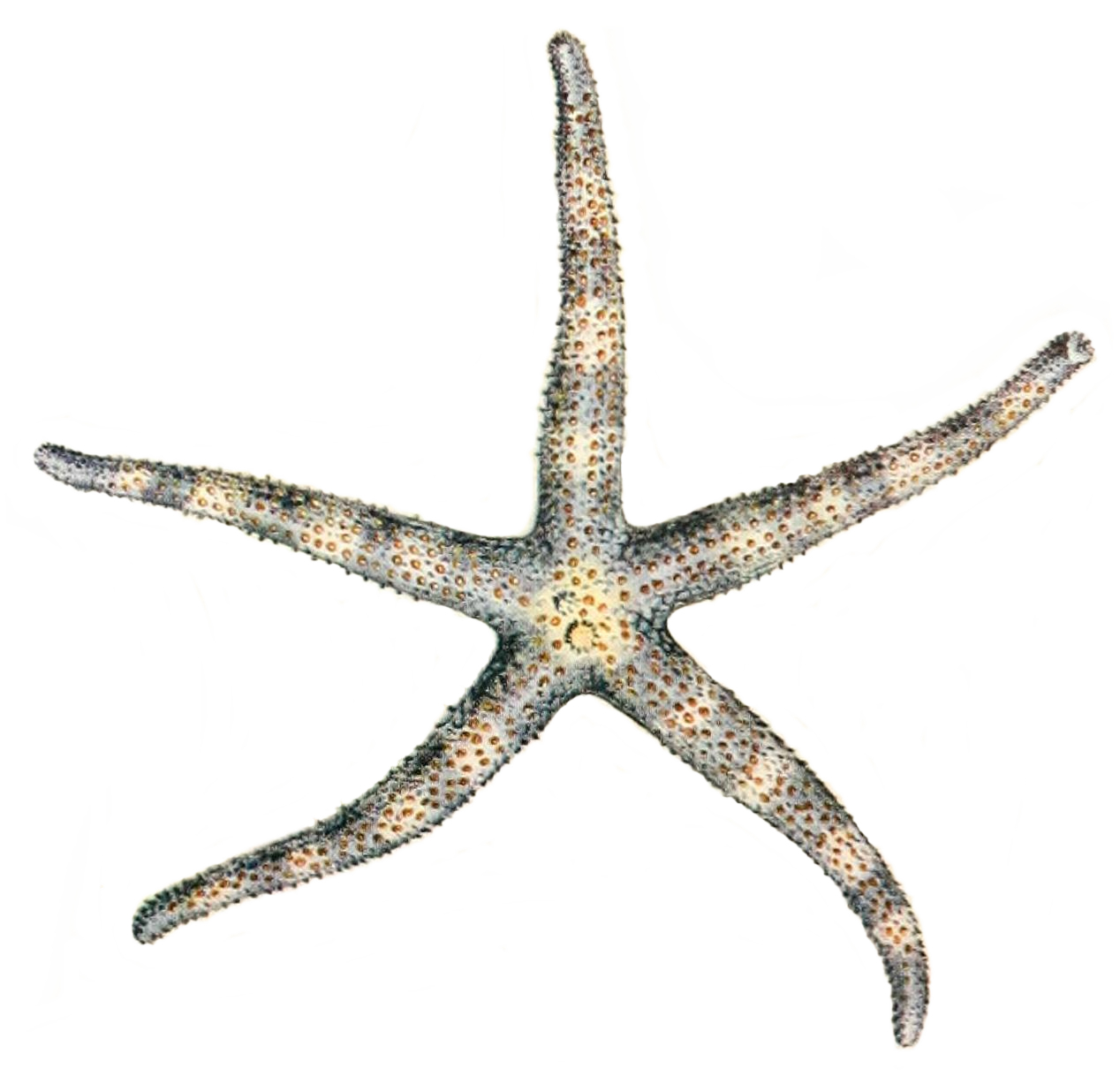

Scientific classification
- Kingdom: Animalia
- Phylum: Echinodermata
- Class: Asteroidea
- Order: Spinulosida
- Family: Echinasteridae
- Genus: Metrodira
- Species: M. subulata

Binomial name
- Metrodira subulata Gray, 1840

Synonyms
- Fromia subulata Perrier, 1878; Linckia subulata Gray, 1840; Scaphaster humberti de Loriol, 1899; Scytaster subulatus Müller & Troschel, 1842

= Metrodira subulata =

Species of starfish

Metrodira subulata is a species of starfish in the family Echinasteridae. It is found on the seabed in shallow parts of the Indo-Pacific region.

== Description ==
Metrodira subulata has long, slender tapering arms. The aboral (upper) surface has many granulations and large pores. The margins have a row of smooth plates and there are short spines at the junctions of the plates. The colour of the aboral surface is yellowish brown. The spines are red, which contrasts with the sombre body colour and is considered an aposematic trait.
