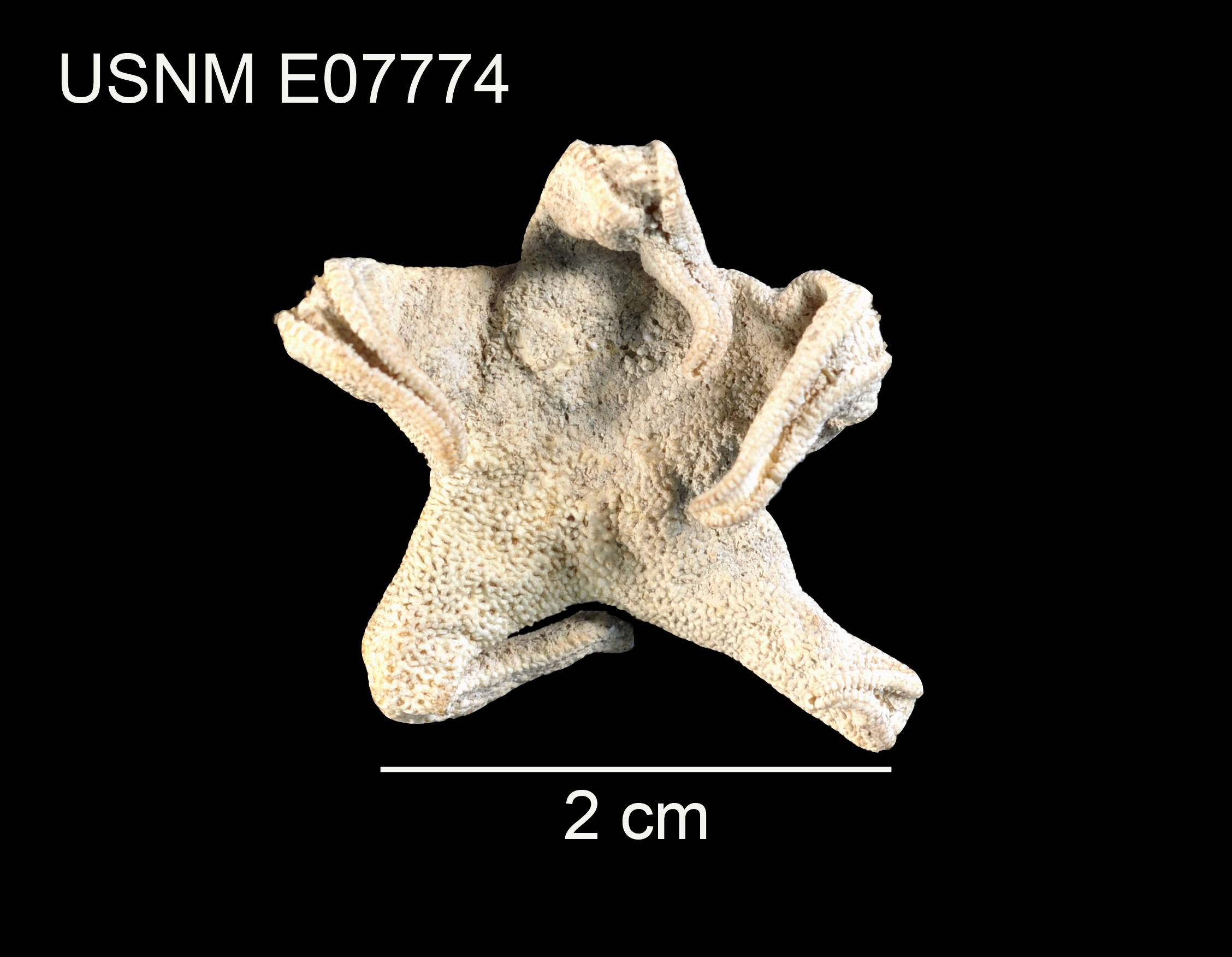
- Henricia lisa

Scientific classification
- Kingdom: Animalia
- Phylum: Echinodermata
- Class: Asteroidea
- Order: Spinulosida
- Family: Echinasteridae
- Genus: Henricia
- Species: H. lisa

Binomial name
- Henricia lisa A.H. Clark, 1949

= Henricia lisa =

Species of starfish

Henricia lisa is a species of starfish in the family Echinasteridae found in deep water in the northern Atlantic Ocean.

== Biology ==
Members of the genus Henricia are suspension feeders, and feed efficiently on phytoplankton. For this purpose, the starfishes have Tiedemann pouches at the bases of the digestive glands; these create water currents by use of flagellae. These starfishes are often found in association with sponges, benefiting from the current of water they create.

Research in the laboratory shows that Henricia lisa spawns twice a year, doing so when the temperature of the seawater rises or falls through the 3 to 4 °C (37 to 39 °F) range. At around this time, the starfishes have a tendency to aggregate, presumably thereby increasing their chances of breeding success. The actual release of gametes into the sea is synchronised with the phases of the moon.

Henricia lisa has an unusual breeding strategy. The females produce two types of egg; a few are retained under the body and are brooded, and these eggs are pale in colour; larger numbers of eggs are freely spawned into the water column, and these eggs are dark in colour. It is hypothesized that the extra pigment in the spawned eggs may be helpful in protecting the lipid content of the eggs and thus enhance larval survival.
