= Avilés Canyon =

Submarine canyon

Coordinates: 43°55′0″N 6°19′0″W

Map of the Bay of Biscay where the Cantabrian Sea is located in

The Avilés Canyon is a submarine canyon located off the coast of Asturias, Spain in the Cantabrian Sea. It makes up a system of submarine canyons called the Avilés Canyon System (ACS) with the Corviro and La Gaviera canyons. It runs obliquely off the coast for 75 kilometers and reaches depths of nearly 5 kilometers making it one of the deepest submarine canyons on Earth.

== Biodiversity ==
It is a hotspot in biodiversity with around 1,300 different species being found in the Avilés Canyon. Many whale species such as Sperm whales use this area as a passing zone. There are many species of starfish found in this canyon with species such as Nymphaster arenatus and Henricia caudani being frequently observed. Species of white coral such as Madrepora occulata and Lophelia pertusa also build reefs in cold waters that can date back to more than 8,000 years ago.

=== List of species observed ===
==== Cetacea ====
1. Sperm whale (Physeter macrocephalus)

==== Asteroidea ====
1. Henricia caudani
2. Henricia sexradiata
3. Myxaster perrieri
4. Novodinia pandina
5. Nymphaster arenatus
6. Radiaster tizardi

==== Cephalopoda ====
1. Giant squid (Architeuthis dux)

==== Coral ====
1. Madrepora occulata
2. Lophelia pertusa
