= The emigrant's mother =

Bronze sculpture on the coast of Gijón, Spain dedicated to mothers of emigrants

La madre del emigrante
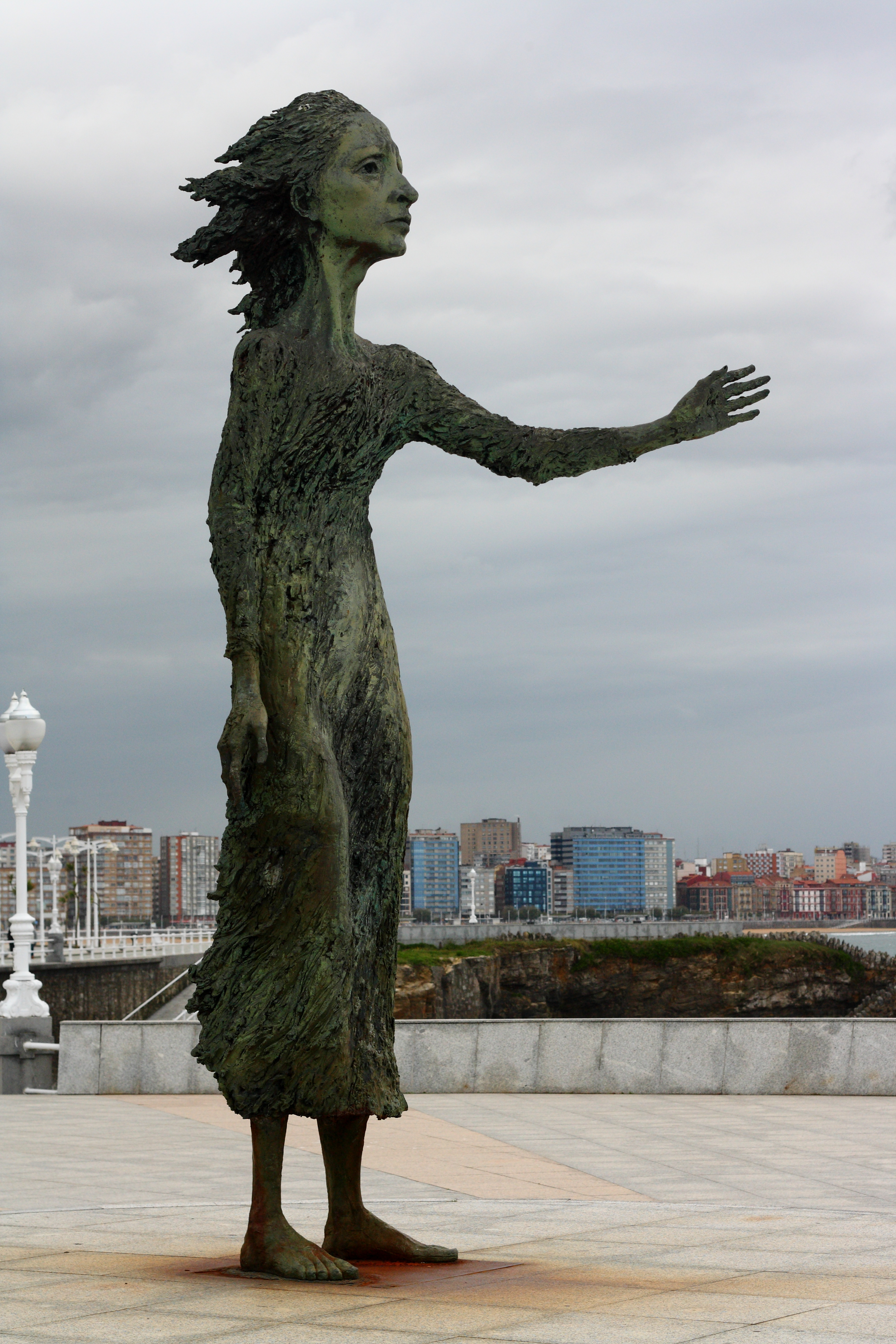
- La lloca'l Rinconín
- Artist: Ramón Muriedas Mazorra

The emigrant's mother, also known as La lloca'l Rinconín or la muyerona (from the Asturian "La loca del Rinconín" and "La mujerona"), is a sculpture by Ramón Muriedas Mazorra located in Somió, on the coast of Gijón, Spain, erected as a homage to Asturian emigration around the world.

== Description ==
The bronze work depicts a woman with curled hair and a dress glued to her body by the wind, with her hand extended, waving goodbye, gazing towards the sea, where her children disappeared, waiting for their return while suffering exposure to the elements of the Cantabrian Sea.

== History ==
In 1958 the first Congress of Asturian Societies took place. Here it was proposed to the mayor of Gijón, Cecilio Olivier Sobera, the creation of a monument in El Musel or another place in the city that would pay tribute to the mothers of emigrants. The proposal was accepted and the City Council, together with the Cuban consulate, initiated a Pro-Monument Commission. The Executive of this Commission consisted of the mayor of Gijón as president, the consuls of Cuba and Argentina and the president of the Asturian Center of Havana as members; and the director of the Office of America as secretary. After some discussions, it was decided to call a contest open to Hispanic American artists for the realization of the sculpture.

However, it was not until March 1964 that the jury was formed and the contest was announced, which would remain open until May. The final selection was planned for June. The contest was communicated to the Asturian Centers and Asturian Societies through the magazine Mundo Asturiano, official organ of the World Federation of Asturian Societies and of the Office of America. The selection was extended pending the execution of the 3rd Congress of Asturian Societies, during which almost a hundred models and sketches that had been received for the contest were exhibited. Despite this, there were doubts as the project had not received funding and the location of the monument was not certain; to which was added the lack of written bases for the selection of the winner, which led to the project being postponed again.

In 1967 the project was resumed, assigning Ramón Muriedas Mazorra the task of creating the work and the Cerro de Santa Catalina, at that time a military space that was expected to be recovered, as its home. The sketches of the work were presented during the 4th World Congress of Asturian Societies, but it received negative aesthetic opinions as "excessively modern". The image then was expected to portray a traditional mother with typical Asturian outfit: long pleated skirt, headdress scarf, shawl and albarcas. In addition to Muriedas, the architects Fernando Castevany and Enrique Álvarez-Sala Morís, would be in charge of the project, which would be delayed again until in 1969 the Gijón city council decided to allocate its own funds to finalize the project. On September 2, the Permanent Commission approved the budget, which was ratified by the Plenary the next day. Muriedas made a new sketch and it was decided to place the monument in the Rinconín, near the Rosario Acuña area, since the Cerro de Santa Catalina was still a military area.

== Inauguration ==
The monument was inaugurated on September 18, 1970 during the 5th World Congress of Asturian Societies. A simple pedestal was prepared in the Rinconín, originally intended as a temporary location, with a simple inscription:

TO THE MOTHERS
OF OUR MIGRANTS
WHO WITH THEIR LIVES
ARE THE FOUNDATION OF OUR SPAIN
GIJÓN
ASTURIAS 1970

Various local authorities were present at the opening ceremony: Ignacio Bertrand Bertrand, mayor of Gijón; Juan Manuel Mateu de Ros, civil governor of Asturias; Aurelio González González, President of the World Congress of Asturian Societies; and Gonzalo García Passigli, representative of the Spanish Institute of Emigration. During his speech, Ignacio Bertrand assured that that place was provisional, and "possibly [the sculpture] will be placed further away, on the top of La Providencia".

After its inauguration, the monument received multiple criticisms. The newspaper La Nueva España titled its September 10, 1970 edition "A monument that is not liked" and mentioned that a more classical sculpture was expected. At the time of its inauguration, it was too modern a work, proof of this is what was written about it: "That clown cannot depict a sacred symbol like the mothers of our emigrants to America."

== Explosion and subsequent repairs ==
In 1976 an explosion damaged the lower part of the structure, which was painted to cover the damage. The monument, already damaged by the explosion, was tilted after a strong storm that hit the coasts of Asturias and Cantabria, leaving the figure in a precarious state.

Only when a citizen asked the City Council to sell him the structure, was it decided to repair it in 1995. The person in charge of the repair was Francisco González Macías, who rebuilt the figure's feet and provided it with greater stability through larger shafts and a base to ensure its stability. He also modified the head and the left hand.

After the repair, she was relegated to a warehouse and not located again in the Rinconín until the election of the first democratic government of the city in the early 1980s. Finally, between 1995 and 1996, its pedestal was replaced and it was located in a small, slightly elevated square that is accessed through a small staircase. The inscription on the pedestal was replaced by the poem "Al son del agua" by the poet Alfonso Camín from Gijón.

Between February and July 2004, she underwent a comprehensive restoration, as she was damaged. Specifically, several missing fingers on her right hand, cracks in her feet, and a rusty internal structure.

In 2012, she was repaired again, after the middle finger of the right hand was vandalized.
