= Aleutihenricia =

Scientific classification
- Kingdom: Animalia
- Phylum: Echinodermata
- Class: Asteroidea
- Order: Spinulosida
- Family: Echinasteridae
- Genus: Aleutihenricia; Clark & Jewett, 2010

Species
- See text

Genus of starfishes

Aleutihenricia is a genus of starfish in the family Echinasteridae in the order Spinulosida.

== Species ==
The following species are recognised by the World Register of Marine Species:

- Aleutihenricia beringiana (Djakonov, 1950)
- Aleutihenricia derjungini (Djakonov, 1950)
- Aleutihenricia federi Clark & Jewett, 2010
- Aleutihenricia reticulata (Hayashi, 1940)
