= Metrodira =

Scientific classification
- Kingdom: Animalia
- Phylum: Echinodermata
- Class: Asteroidea
- Order: Spinulosida
- Family: Echinasteridae
- Genus: Metrodira; Gray, 1840

Species
- See text

Synonyms
- Fromia (Metrodira) Perrier, 1878; Scaphaster de Loriol, 1899

Genus of starfishes

Metrodira is a genus of starfish in the family Echinasteridae.

== Species ==
The following species are recognised by the World Register of Marine Species:

- Metrodira dubia
- Metrodira gracilenta Lovén
- Metrodira subtilis (Lutken, 1871)
- Metrodira subulata Gray, 1840
