= C. stelleri =

C. stelleri may refer to:

- Steller's jay (Cyanocitta stelleri), species of birds
- The gumboot chiton (Cryptochiton stelleri), species of chitons
