= Rhopiella =

Scientific classification
- Kingdom: Animalia
- Phylum: Echinodermata
- Class: Asteroidea
- Order: Spinulosida
- Family: Echinasteridae
- Genus: Rhopiella; Fisher, 1940
- Species: R. hirsuta

Binomial name
- Rhopiella hirsuta (Koehler, 1920)

Genus of starfishes

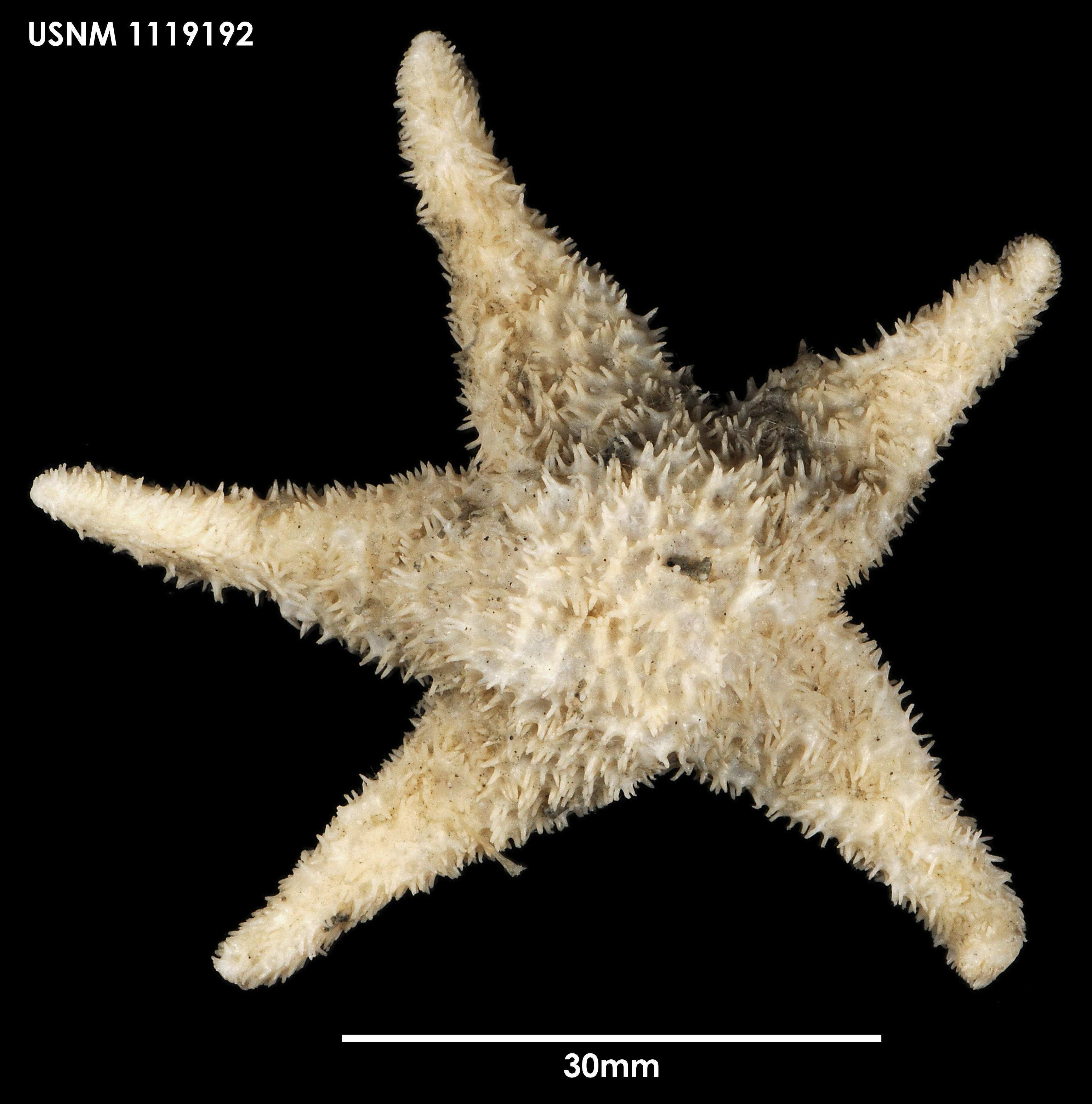

Rhopiella is a genus of starfish in the family Echinasteridae in the order Spinulosida. The only species is Rhopiella hirsuta.
