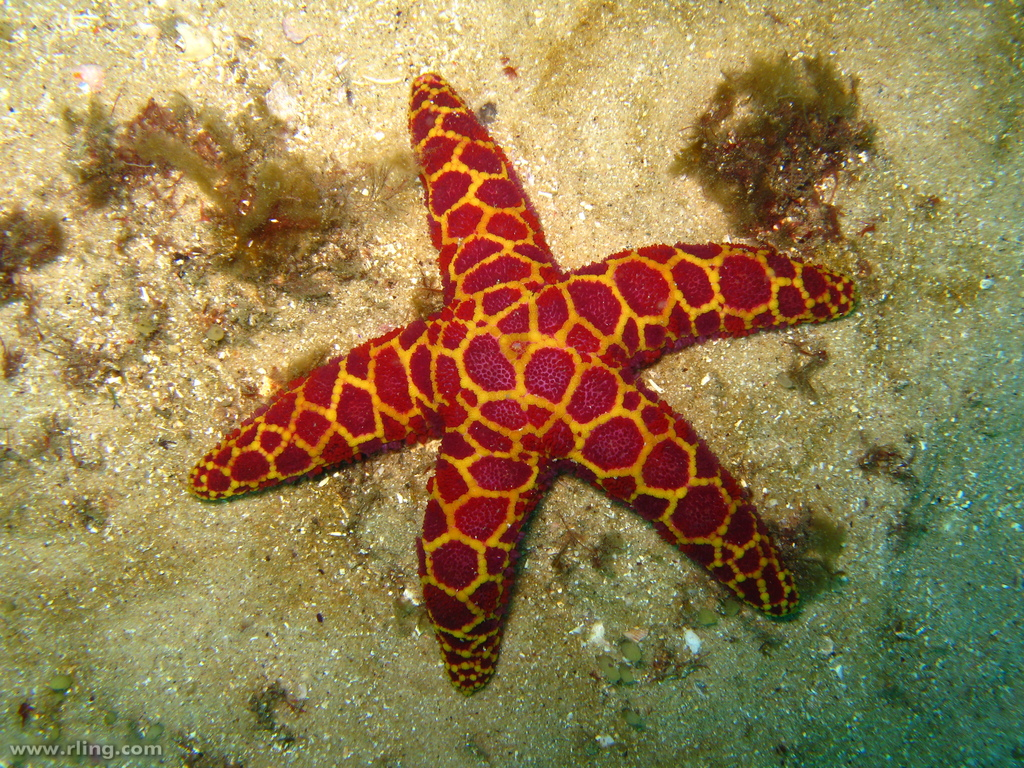

Scientific classification
- Kingdom: Animalia
- Phylum: Echinodermata
- Class: Asteroidea
- Order: Spinulosida
- Family: Echinasteridae
- Genus: Plectaster; Sladen, 1889
- Species: P. decanus

Binomial name
- Plectaster decanus (Müller & Troschel 1843)

Synonyms
- Echinaster decanus Müller & Troschel, 1843

= Plectaster =

Species of starfish

Plectaster decanus, the mosaic sea star, is a species of sea star found off the south coast of Australia. It is the only species in the genus Plectaster.

== Description ==
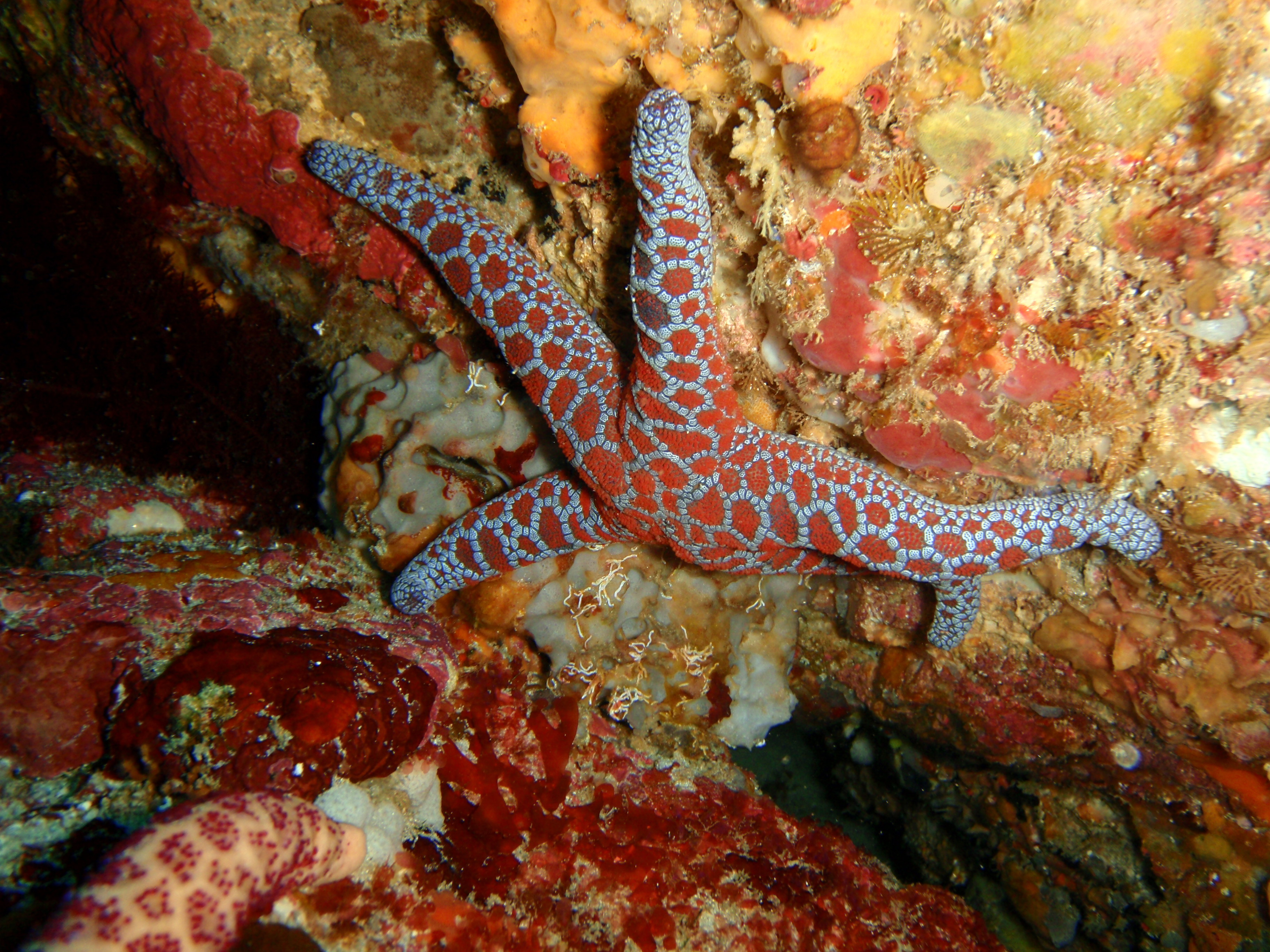
Plectaster decanus

This five-armed starfish is distinguished by its very bright colors. A group of raised yellow ridges covers its red upper surface and it is soft in texture. Plectaster decanus is one of the few poisonous sea stars, and can cause numbness in humans if it is carried for any length of time.

== Distribution and habitat ==
Plectaster decanus lives in rocky reefs off the southern coast of Australia. It lives at a depth of 30–600 ft (10–180 m).

== Food ==
Plectaster decanus primarily feeds on sponges.
