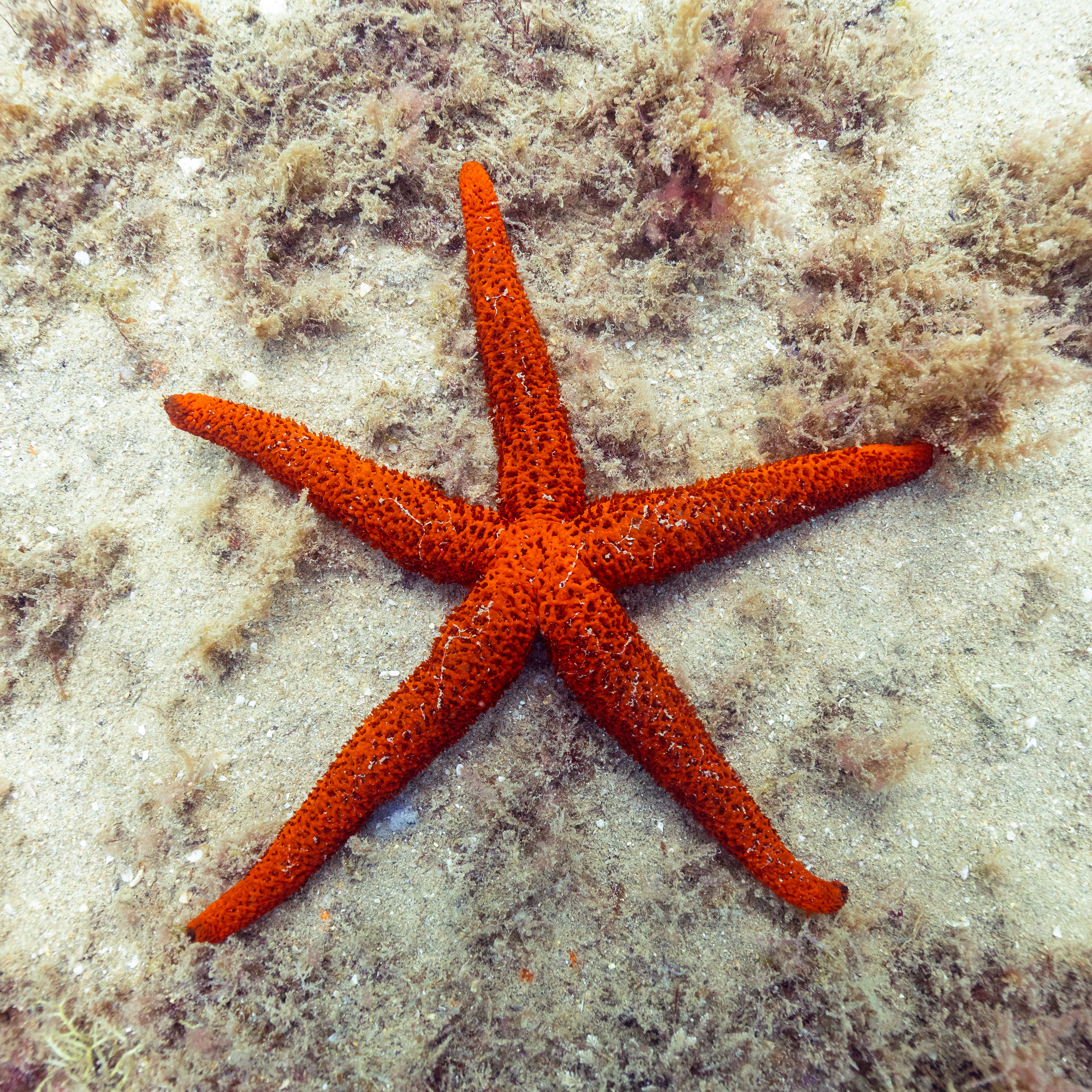

Scientific classification
- Domain: Eukaryota
- Kingdom: Animalia
- Phylum: Echinodermata
- Class: Asteroidea
- Order: Spinulosida
- Family: Echinasteridae
- Genus: Echinaster
- Species: E. sepositus

Binomial name
- Echinaster sepositus Retzius, 1805

= Echinaster sepositus =

Species of starfish

Echinaster sepositus, the Mediterranean red sea star, is a species of starfish from the East Atlantic, including the Mediterranean Sea.

== Description ==
Echinaster sepositus has five relatively slender arms around a small central disc. It usually has a diameter of up to 20 cm (8 in), but can exceptionally reach up to 30 cm (12 in). It is a bright orange-red in colour, and has a soapy surface texture unlike superficially similar Henricia starfish (another somewhat similar species from the same region is Ophidiaster ophidianus). The surface is dotted with evenly spaced pits from which the animal can extend its deep red gills (papula).

== Distribution ==
Echinaster sepositus is found in the East Atlantic north of the Equator, including the Mediterranean Sea where it is one of the most common starfish (although virtually absent from some localities). Its northern limit is the English Channel, but only on the French side. It is found at depths of 1 to 250 m (3–820 ft) in a wide range of habitats, including rocky, sandy and muddy bottoms, and sea grass meadows (Posidonia oceanica and Zostera).
