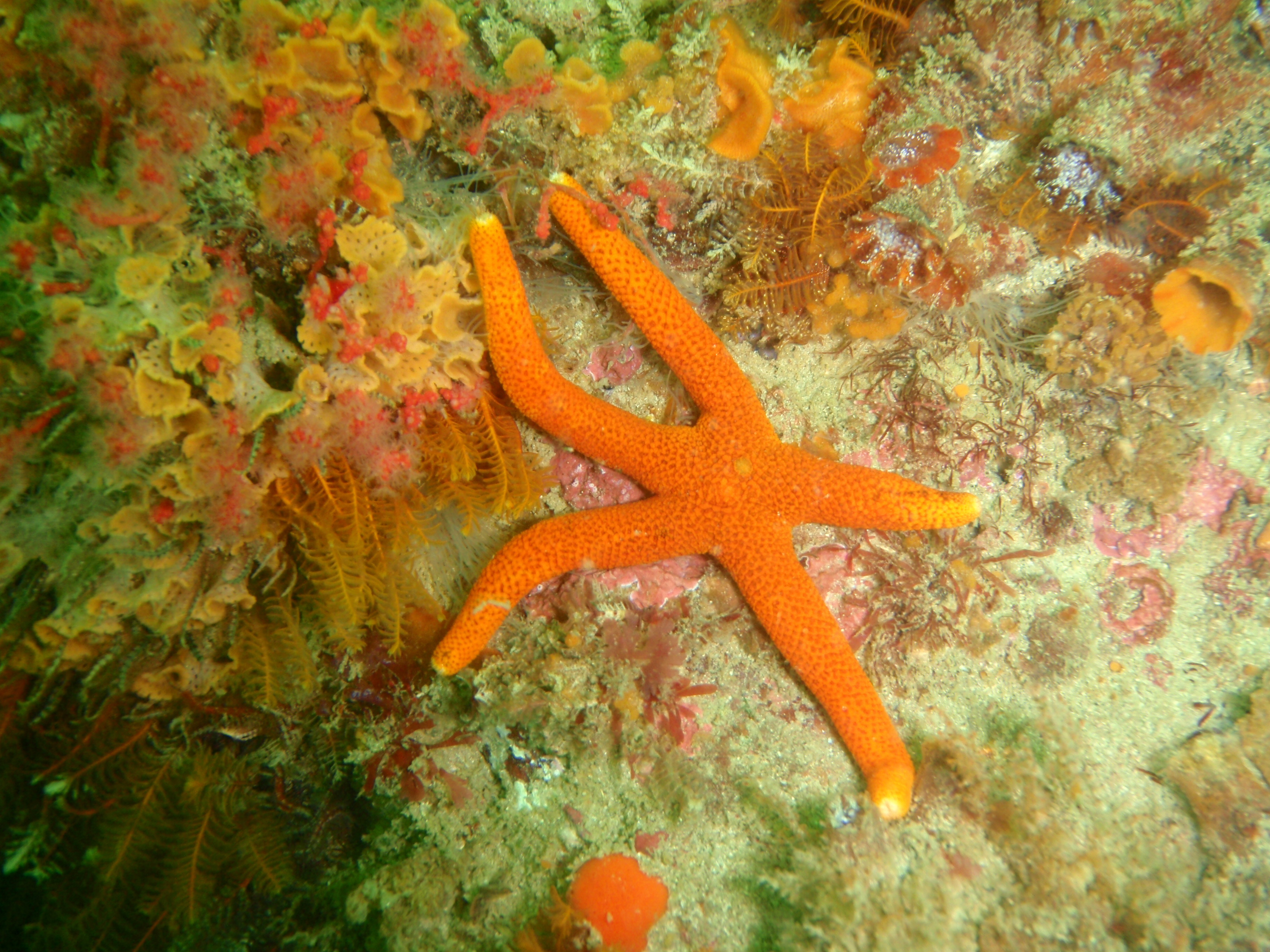

Scientific classification
- Kingdom: Animalia
- Phylum: Echinodermata
- Class: Asteroidea
- Order: Spinulosida
- Family: Echinasteridae
- Genus: Henricia
- Species: H. ornata

Binomial name
- Henricia ornata (Perrier, 1869)

Synonyms
- Cribrella ornata Perrier, 1869; Echinaster ornatus Perrier, 1869

= Henricia ornata =

Species of starfish

Henricia ornata, the reticulated starfish, is a species of starfish in the family Echinasteridae. It is native to the southeastern Atlantic Ocean on the coast of South Africa, the type locality being the Cape of Good Hope.
