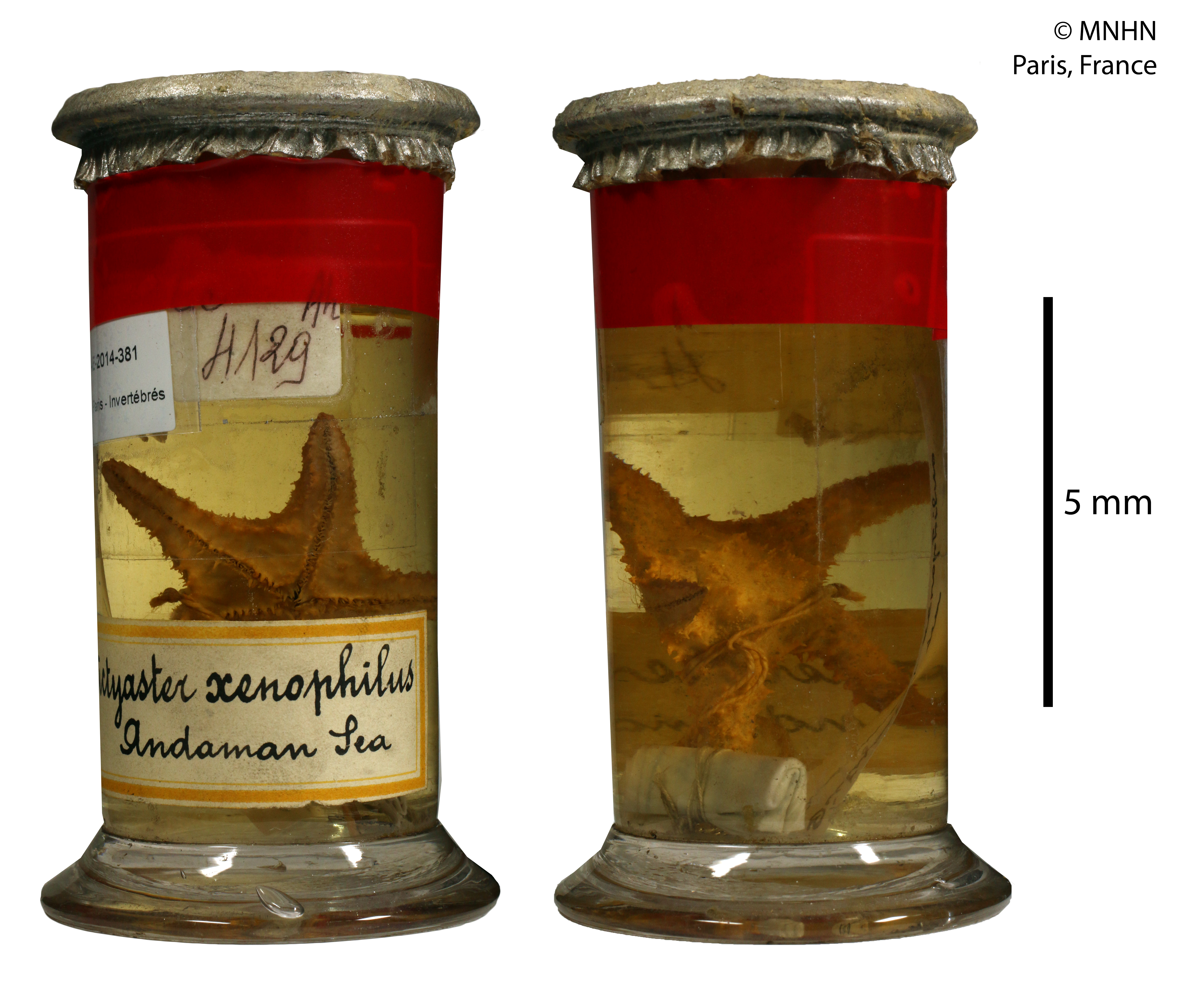

Scientific classification
- Kingdom: Animalia
- Phylum: Echinodermata
- Class: Asteroidea
- Order: Spinulosida
- Family: Echinasteridae
- Genus: Dictyaster; Wood-Mason & Alcock, 1891

Species
- See text

= Dictyaster =

Genus of starfishes

Dictyaster is a small genus of starfish in the family Echinasteridae in the order Spinulosida.

== Species ==
The following two species are recognised by the World Register of Marine Species:

- Dictyaster xenophilus Wood-Mason & Alcock, 1891
- Dictyaster wood-masoni Alcock, 1893 (nomen nudum, Undescribed)
