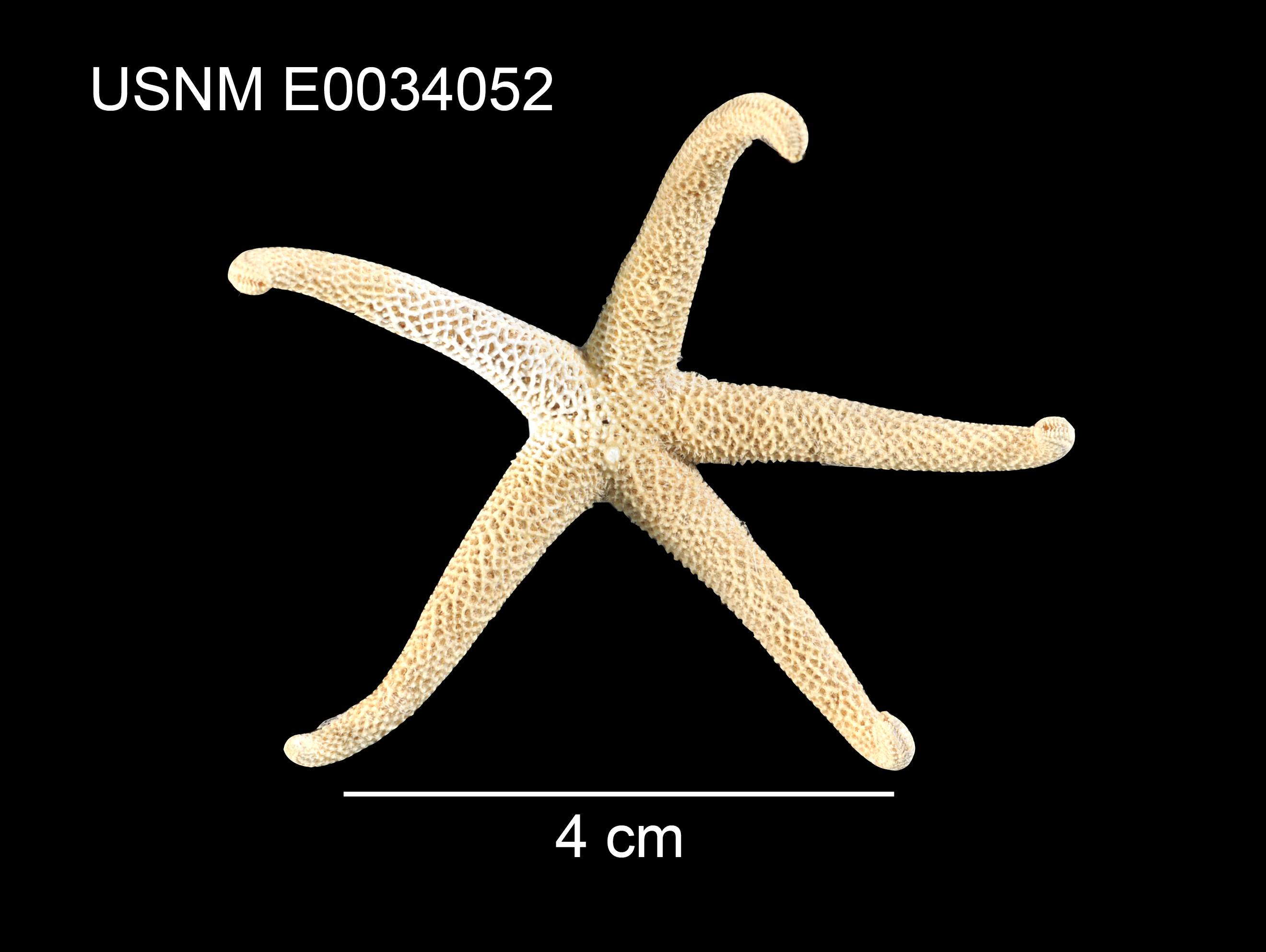
- Odontohenricia

Scientific classification
- Kingdom: Animalia
- Phylum: Echinodermata
- Class: Asteroidea
- Order: Spinulosida
- Family: Echinasteridae
- Genus: Odontohenricia; Rowe & Albertson, 1988

Species
- See text

= Odontohenricia =

Genus of starfishes

Odontohenricia is a genus of starfish in the family Echinasteridae.

== Species ==
The following species are recognised:-

- Odontohenricia ahearnae Clark & Jewett, 2010
- Odontohenricia anarea O'Hara, 1998
- Odontohenricia aurantia Clark & Jewett, 2010
- Odontohenricia clarkae Rowe & Albertson, 1988
- Odontohenricia endeavouri Rowe & Albertson, 1988
- Odontohenricia fisheri Rowe & Albertson, 1988
- Odontohenricia hayashii Rowe & Albertson, 1988
- Odontohenricia violacea Clark & Jewett, 2010
