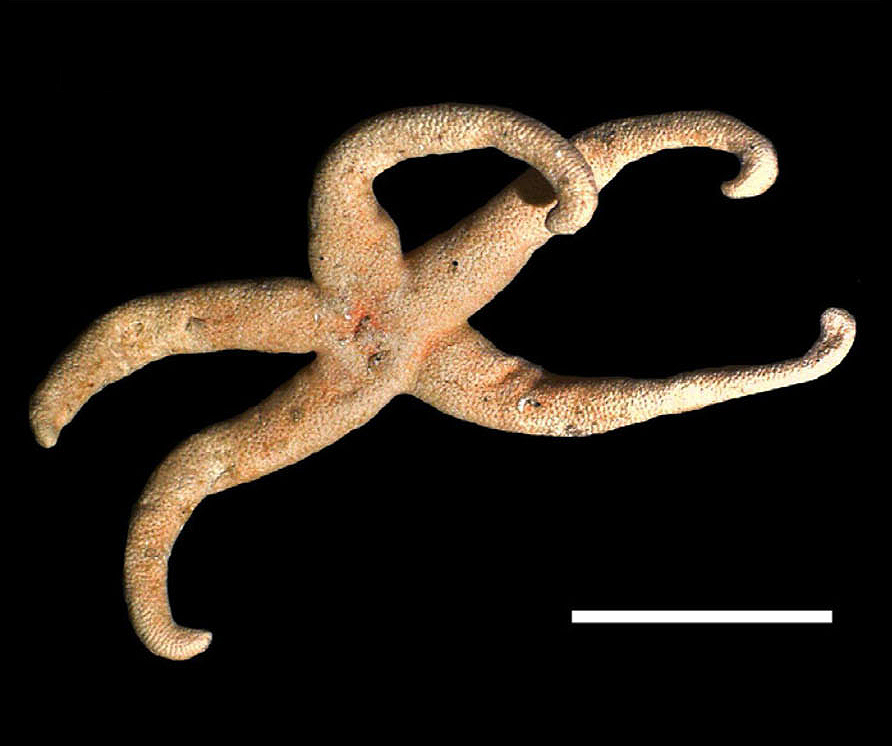
- Henricia caudani. Scale bar=2 cm

Scientific classification
- Kingdom: Animalia
- Phylum: Echinodermata
- Class: Asteroidea
- Order: Spinulosida
- Family: Echinasteridae
- Genus: Henricia
- Species: H. caudani

Binomial name
- Henricia caudani (Koehler, 1895)

= Henricia caudani =

Species of starfish

Henricia caudani is a species of starfish belonging to the family Echinasteridae.
