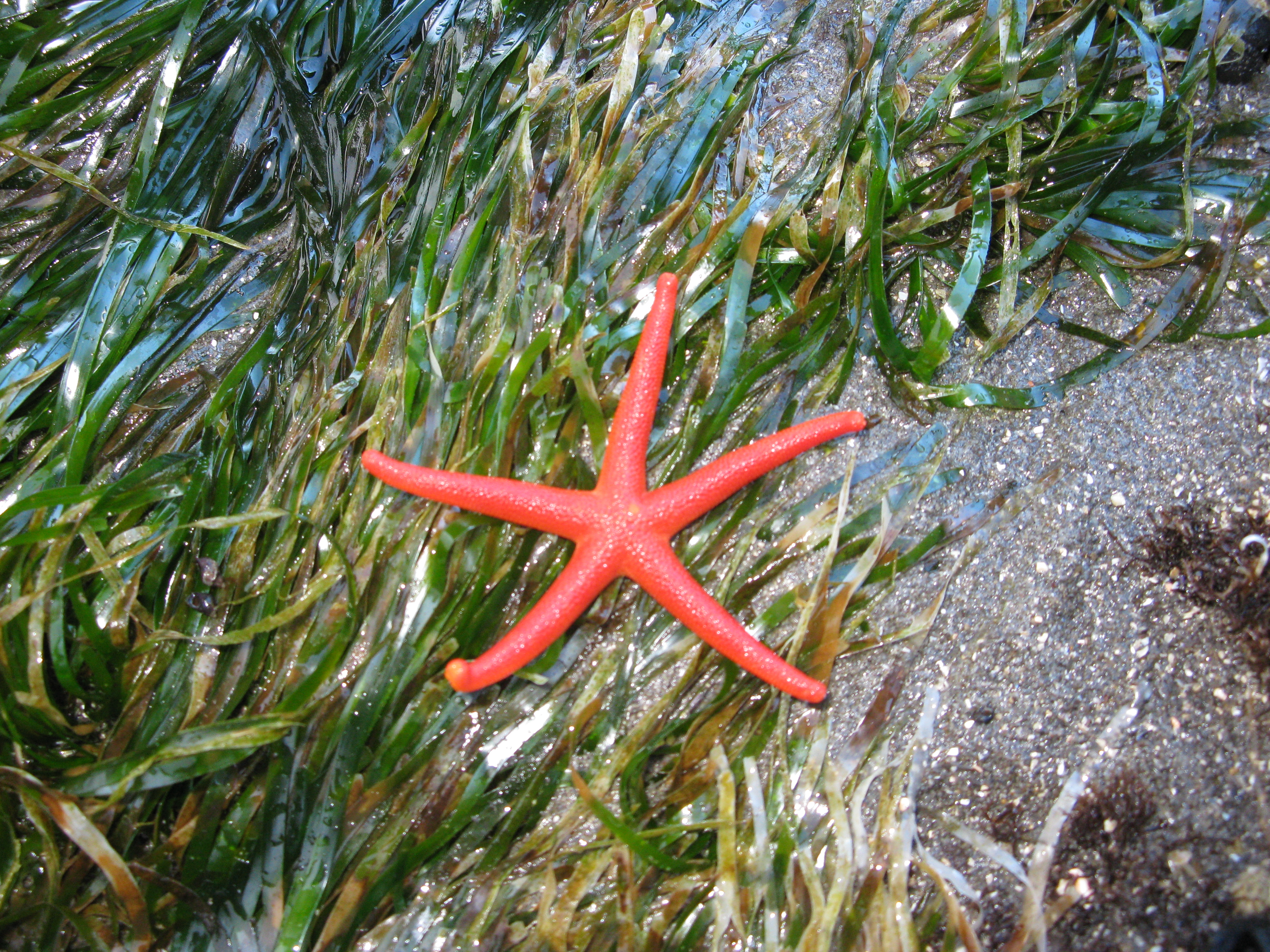

Scientific classification
- Kingdom: Animalia
- Phylum: Echinodermata
- Class: Asteroidea
- Order: Spinulosida
- Family: Echinasteridae
- Genus: Henricia
- Species: H. leviuscula

Binomial name
- Henricia leviuscula (Stimpson), 1857

= Henricia leviuscula =

Species of starfish

Henricia leviuscula, commonly called the Pacific blood star, is a species of sea star found along the Pacific coast of North America.

== Description ==
They can usually be identified by their bright orange-red color, but there can also be many variations from tan to almost purple. The disk can be a mottled gray color. There can also be a saddle-like marking of lilac blotches between the rays, but the rays are not mottled. They commonly have 5 rays (occasionally 4–6). The rays are smooth and appear smooth due to the lack of pedicellariae and spines. The species is relatively small; the diameter is usually over 8 cm and rarely gets larger than 12 cm. As with all seastars the blood star has a madreporite which can be seen in the image below.

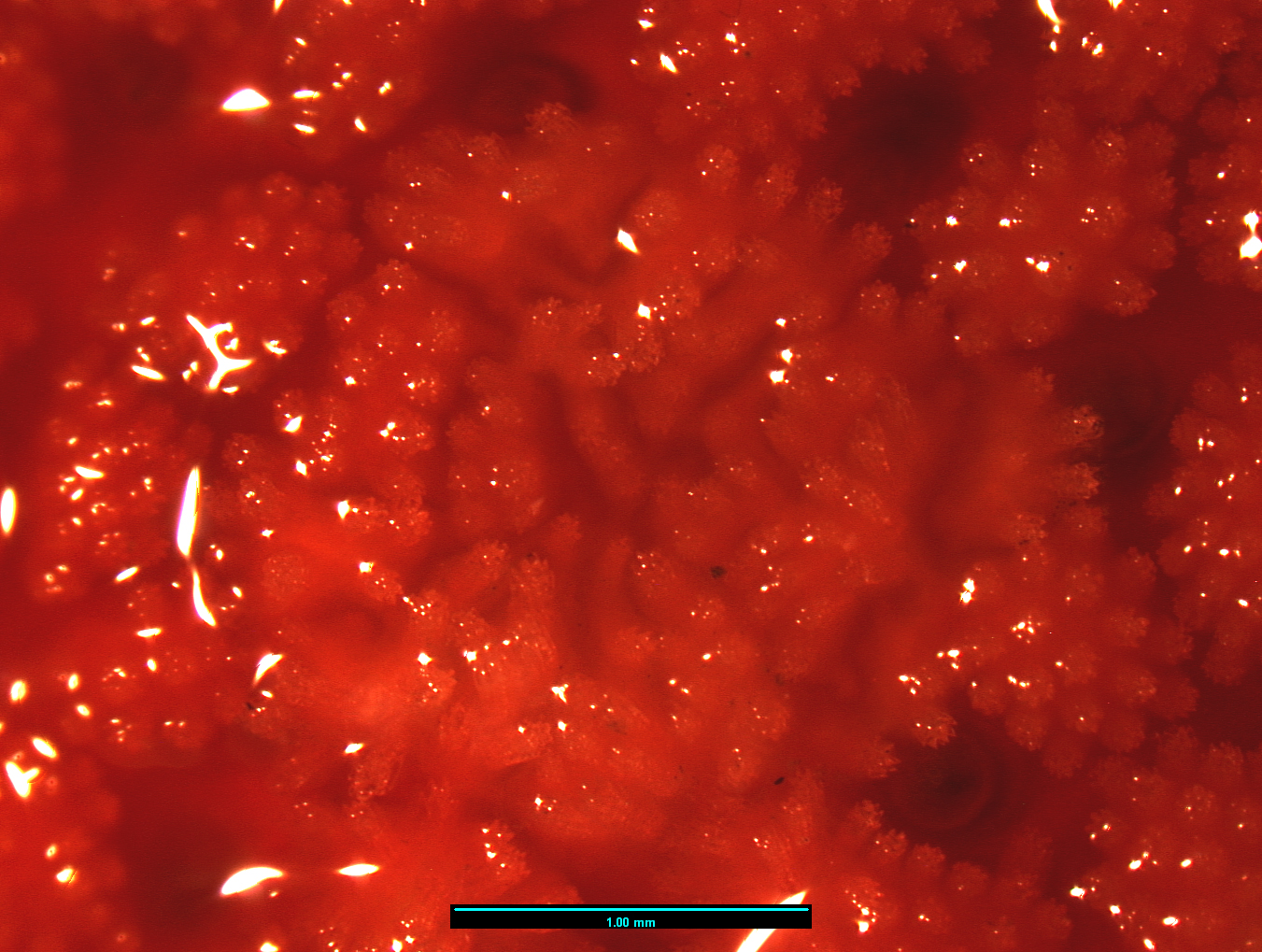
madreporite

== Reproduction and life history ==
Sexes are dioecious and females are not known to brood young. This statement is in conflict with other sources that state that smaller females brood their young and larger females discharge eggs directly in the water and do not brood them. This is one reason that is leading biologists to believe this is a species complex. Embryonic stages do not adhere to one another but float freely. Post-hatching larvae are ciliated and swim. Spawned eggs have been measured at 1342 μm diameter.

== Behavior ==
In a study comparing seastar righting behavior the Henricia leviuscula twisted arms 1 and 3 toward each other, used arms 4 and 5 to support itself on the bottom of the tank, and moved arm 2 up so it was in a sitting-like position, and began to flip itself over. Overall, it had an average righting time of 15.22 minutes.

== Distribution ==
Its range is from Alaska to Baja California.

== Habitat ==
Its habitat is the intertidal zone under rocks and protected places from the low-tide line to about 400 m deep. They often have a commensal scaleworm, Arctonoe vittata.

== Associations ==
There may be hybrids and possible distinct species that key to Henricia leviuscula. Subspecies are Henricia leviuscula annectens and Henricia leviuscula levivuscula.

== Trophic strategy ==
They mainly feed on sponges and small bacteria. The sea star moves these tiny particles, which are captured in mucus and swept to the mouth by ciliated tracts. It may also feed by applying the stomach to the surfaces of sponges and bryozoa.

== Conservation status ==
Not listed. Predators are humans and birds.

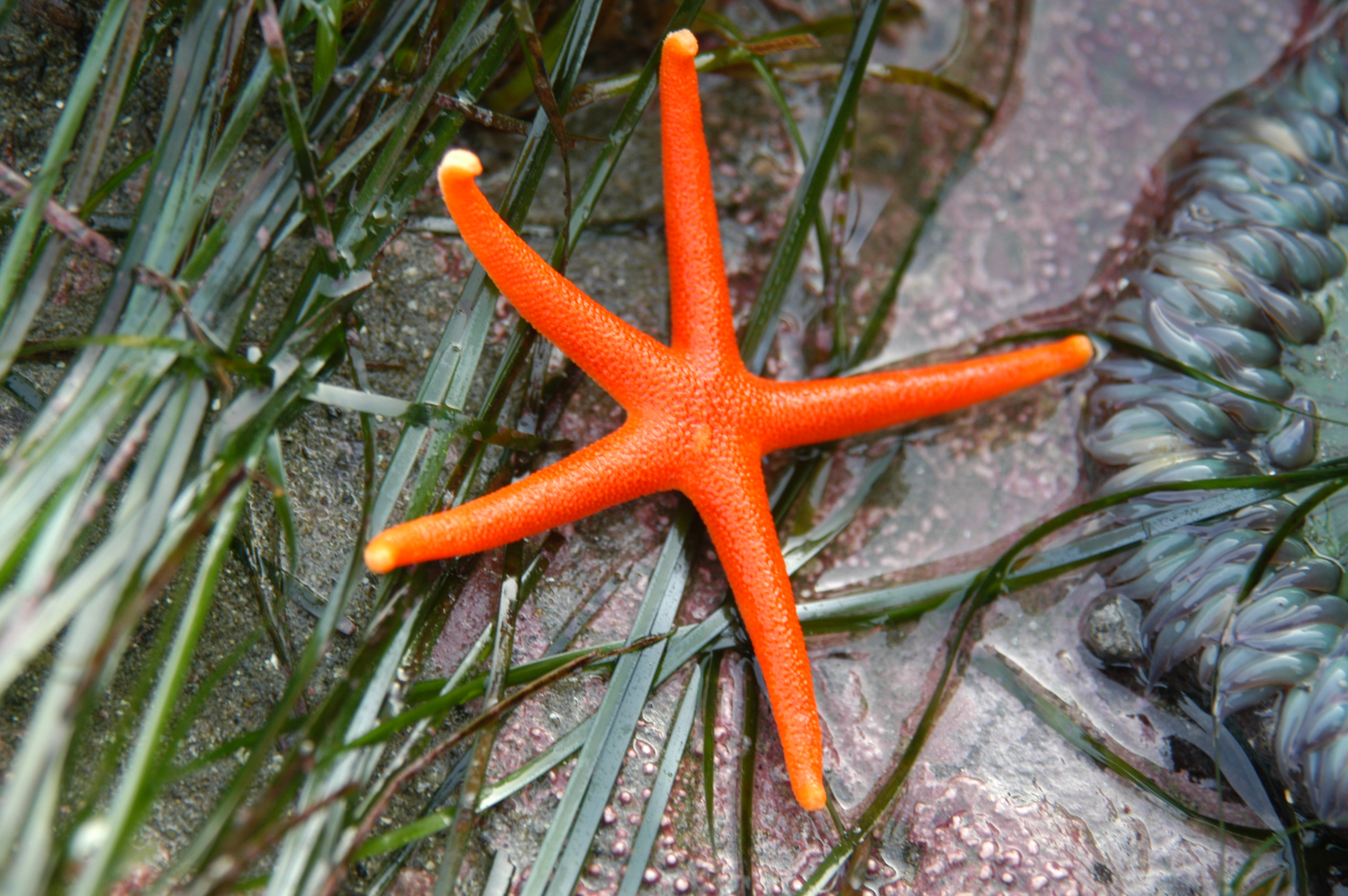
Henricia leviuscula

== Related names ==
- Chaetaster californicus Grube, 1856 synonym
- Cribrella laeviuscula Sladen, 1889 synonym
- Cribrella laeviuscula Whiteaves, 1878 synonym
- Henricia attenuata H.L. Clark, 1901 synonym
- Henricia inequalis Verrill, 1914 synonym
- Henricia lunula Verrill, 1914 synonym
- Henricia spatulifera Verrill, 1909 synonym
- Linckia leviuscula Stimpson, 1857 synonym

== Common names ==
Pacific blood star, Blood star, Blood star fish.
