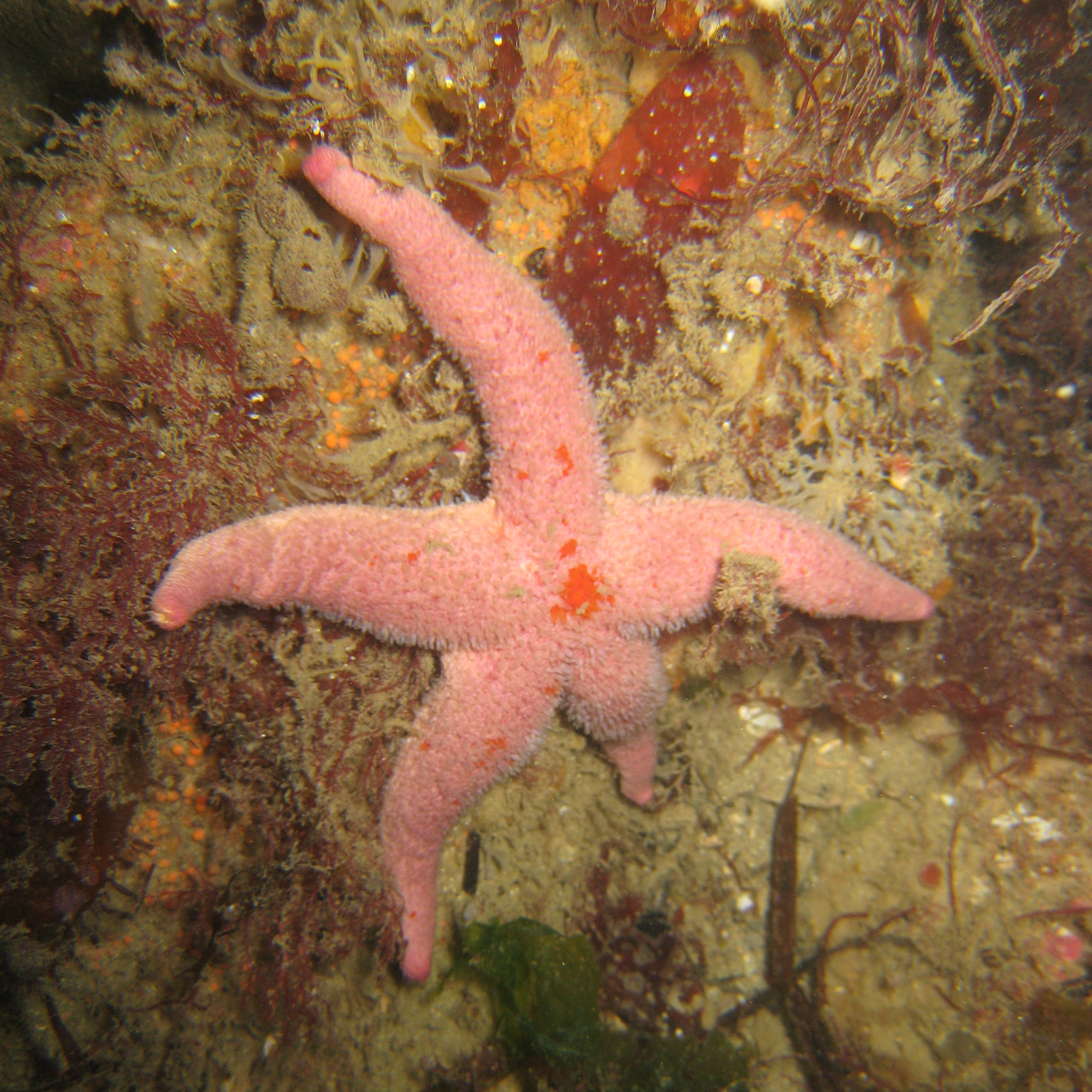
- Bloody Henry (Henricia sanguinolenta)

Scientific classification
- Kingdom: Animalia
- Phylum: Echinodermata
- Class: Asteroidea
- Order: Spinulosida
- Family: Echinasteridae
- Genus: Henricia; Gray, 1840

Type species
- Asterias oculata Pennant, 1777

Synonyms
- Linckia Forbes, 1839 non Nardo, 1834; Cribella Forbes, 1841; Cribrella Lütken, 1857; Magdalenaster Koehler, 1907; Cyllaster A.H. Clark, 1916; Spinohenricia Heding, 1935

= Henricia =

Genus of starfishes

Henricia is a large genus of slender-armed sea stars belonging to the family Echinasteridae. It contains about fifty species.

The sea stars from this genus are ciliary suspension-feeders, filtering phytoplankton.

== Species ==
According to the World Register of Marine Species (WoRMS), 99 species belong to this genus

- Henricia abyssalis Mortensen, 1933
- Henricia alexyi Chichvarkhin & Chichvarkhina, 2017
- Henricia ambigua Djakonov, 1958
- Henricia angusta Djakonov, 1961
- Henricia aniva Djakonov, 1958
- Henricia anomala Hayashi, 1973
- Henricia antillarum Perrier, 1881
- Henricia arcystata Fisher, 1917
- Henricia aspera Fisher, 1906
- Henricia asthenactis Fisher, 1910
- Henricia aucklandiae Mortensen, 1925
- Henricia beringiana Djakonov, 1950
- Henricia caudani (Koehler, 1895)
- Henricia clarki Fisher, 1910
- Henricia compacta (Sladen, 1889)
- Henricia cylindrella (Sladen, 1883)
- Henricia densispina (Sladen, 1878)
- Henricia derjugini Djakonov, 1950
- Henricia diffidens (Koehler, 1923)
- Henricia djakonovi Chichvarkhin, 2017
- Henricia downeyae A.M. Clark, 1987
- Henricia dyscrita Fisher, 1911
- Henricia echinata Clark & Jewett, 2010
- Henricia elachys Clark & Jewett, 2010
- Henricia elegans Djakonov, 1950
- Henricia epiphysialis Ubagan, Lee, Kim & Shin, 2020
- Henricia eschrichti (Müller & Troschel, 1842)
- Henricia exigua Hayashi, 1940
- Henricia fisheri A.M. Clark, 1962
- Henricia fragilis Kobayashi, Kohtsuka & Fujita, 2021
- Henricia gemma Clark & Jewett, 2010
- Henricia gracilis (Ludwig, 1905)
- Henricia granulifera Djakonov, 1958
- Henricia hayashii Djakonov, 1961
- Henricia hedingi Madsen, 1987
- Henricia imitatrix Djakonov, 1961
- Henricia inexpectata Djakonov, 1961
- Henricia insignis Clark & Jewett, 2010
- Henricia iodinea Clark & Jewett, 2010
- Henricia irregularis Hayashi, 1940
- Henricia kapalae Rowe & Albertson, 1987
- Henricia kinkasana Hayashi, 1940
- Henricia kurilensis Djakonov, 1958
- Henricia leviuscula (Stimpson, 1857)
- Henricia lineata Clark & Jewett, 2010
- Henricia lisa A.H. Clark, 1949
- Henricia longispina Fisher, 1910
- Henricia lukinsii (Farquhar, 1898)
- Henricia margarethae Kobayashi, Kohtsuka & Fujita, 2021
- Henricia microplax Fisher, 1917
- Henricia minuta (Bell, 1882)
- Henricia mutans (Koehler, 1909)
- Henricia nana (Ludwig, 1905)
- Henricia nipponica Uchida, 1928
- Henricia obesa (Sladen, 1889)
- Henricia ochotensis Djakonov, 1950
- Henricia oculata (Pennant, 1777)
- Henricia olga Chichvarkhin, 2017
- Henricia ohshimai Hayashi, 1935
- Henricia orientalis Djakonov, 1950
- Henricia ornata (Perrier, 1869)
- Henricia pachyderma Hayashi, 1940
- Henricia pacifica Hayashi, 1940
- Henricia pagenstecheri (Studer, 1885)
- Henricia palaspinaHopkins, 1967 (nomen nudum, Undescribed)
- Henricia parva Koehler, 1912
- Henricia pauperrima Fisher, 1906
- Henricia perforata (O.F. Müller, 1776)
- Henricia pertusa (O.F. Müller, 1776)
- Henricia polyacantha Fisher, 1906
- Henricia praestans (Sladen, 1889)
- Henricia pseudoleviuscula Djakonov, 1958
- Henricia pumila Eernisse, Strathmann & Strathmann, 2010
- Henricia ralphae Fell, 1958
- Henricia reniossa Hayashi, 1940
- Henricia retecta A.M. Clark & Courtman-Stock, 1976
- Henricia reticulata Hayashi, 1940
- Henricia rhytisma Clark & Jewett, 2010
- Henricia robusta Fisher, 1906
- Henricia sachalinica Djakonov, 1958
- Henricia saghaliensis Hayashi, 1940
- Henricia sanguinolenta (O.F. Müller, 1776)
- Henricia seminudus (A.H. Clark, 1916)
- Henricia sexradiata (Perrier, 1881)
- Henricia simplex (Sladen, 1889)
- Henricia singularis Djakonov, 1961
- Henricia skorikovi Djakonov, 1950
- Henricia smilax (Koehler, 1920)
- Henricia solida Djakonov, 1950
- Henricia spinulfera (E. A. Smith, 1876)
- Henricia spongiosa (O. Fabricius, 1780)
- Henricia studeri Perrier, 1891
- Henricia sufflata (Sladen, 1889)
- Henricia tacita Djakonov, 1958
- Henricia tahia McKnight, 1973
- Henricia tumida Verrill, 1914
- Henricia uluudax Clark & Jewett, 2010
- Henricia venturana Durham & Roberts, 1948 †
- Henricia vermilion Clark & Jewett, 2010

== Gallery ==
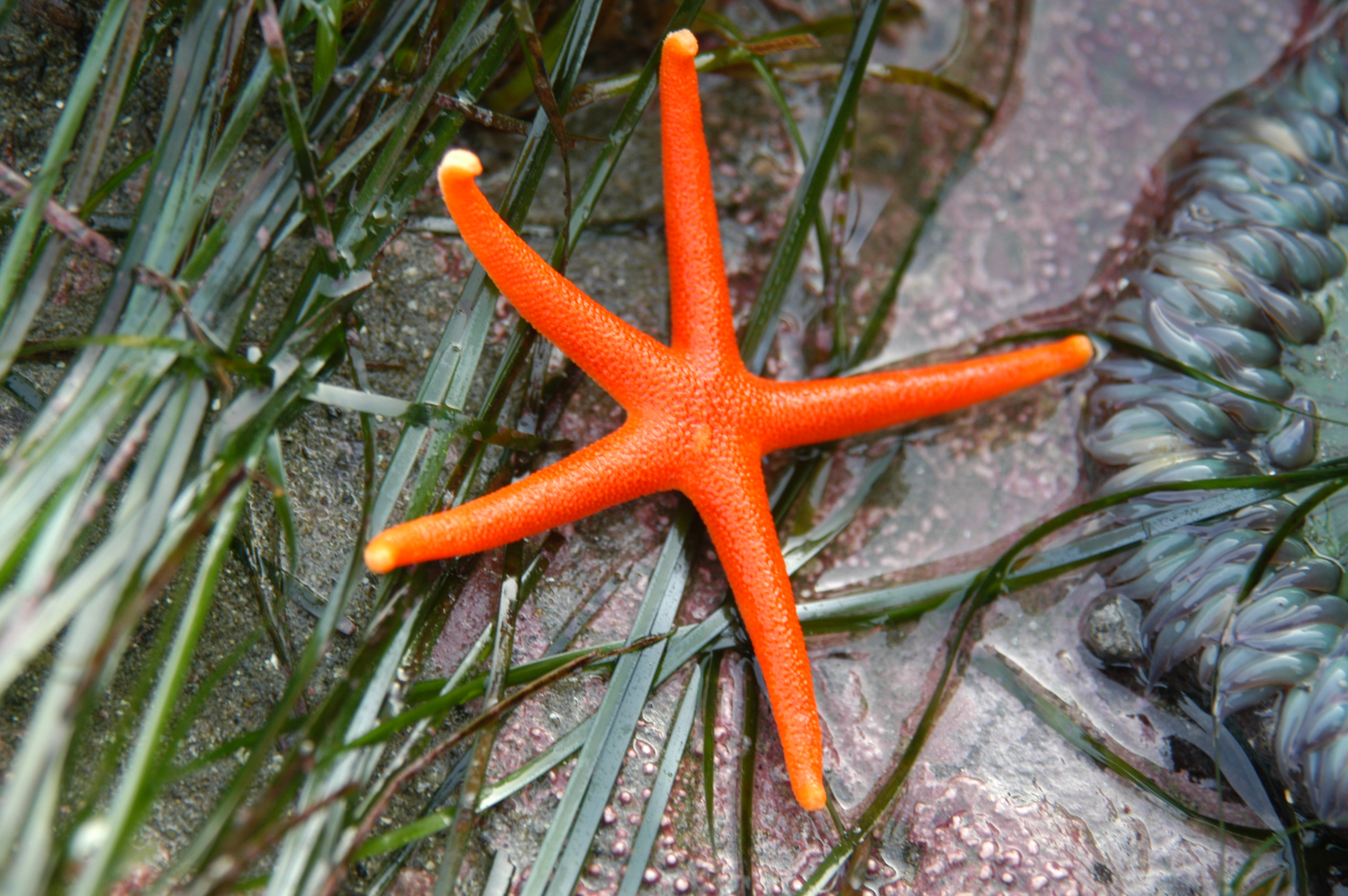
Henricia leviuscula

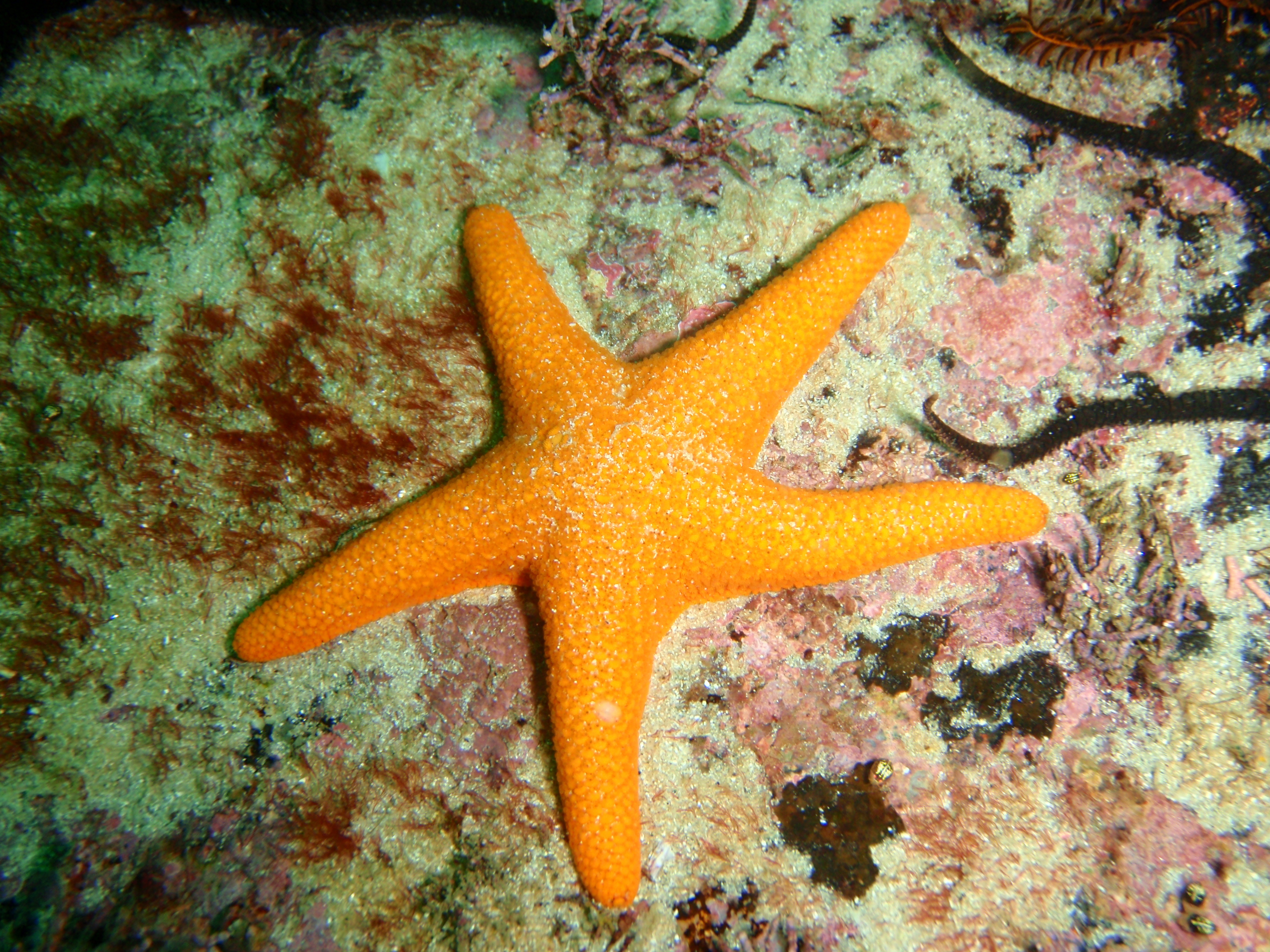
Henricia ornata
