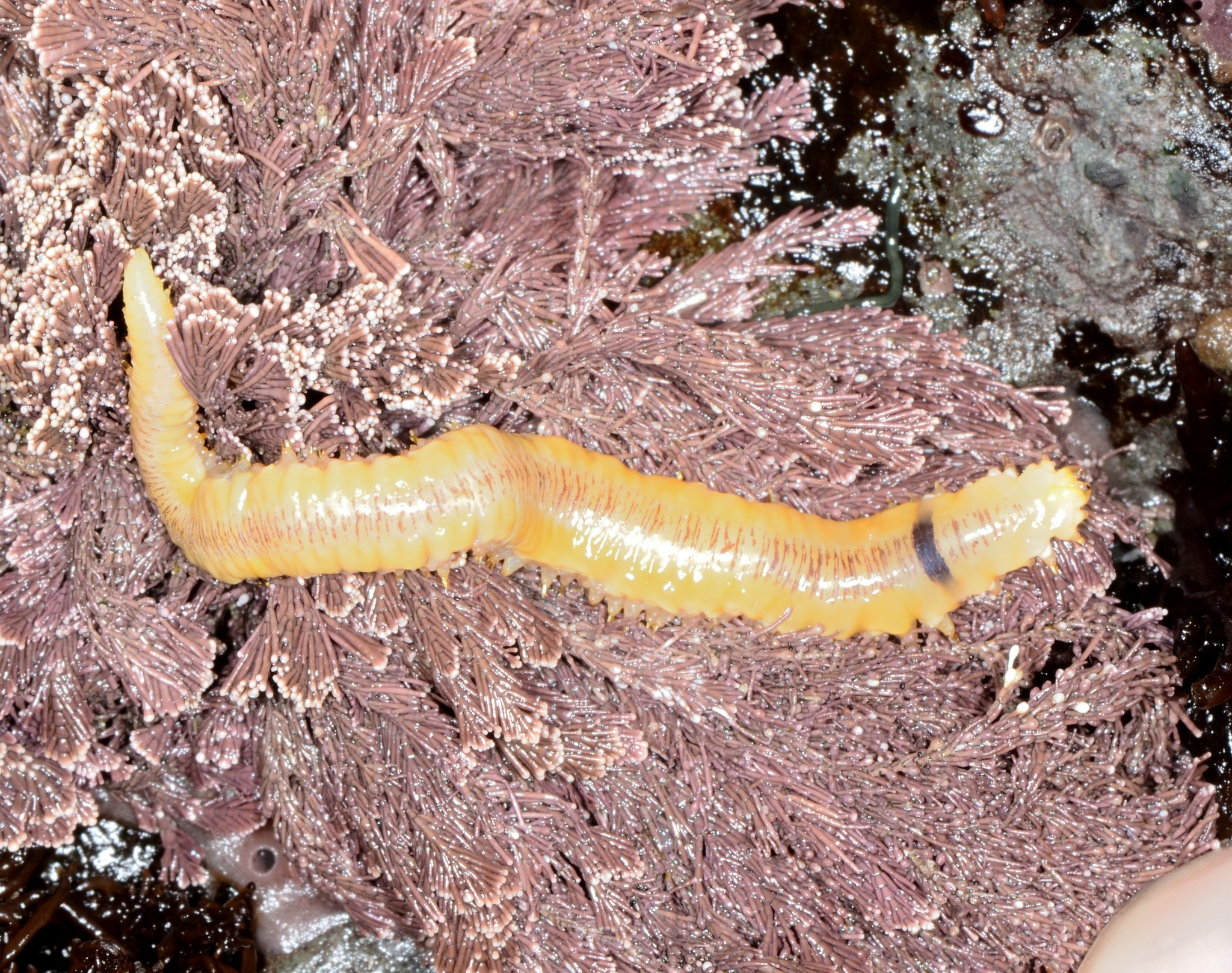

Scientific classification
- Kingdom: Animalia
- Phylum: Annelida
- Clade: Pleistoannelida
- Subclass: Errantia
- Order: Phyllodocida
- Family: Polynoidae
- Genus: Arctonoe
- Species: A. vittata

Binomial name
- Arctonoe vittata (Grube, 1855)

Synonyms
- List: Arctonoe lia Chamberlin, 1920; Halosydna succiniseta Hamilton, 1915; Lepidonotus lordi Baird, 1863; Polynoe lordi (Baird, 1863); Polynoe vittata Grube, 1855

= Arctonoe vittata =

Species of annelid worm

Arctonoe vittata is a species of scaled polychaete worms commonly known as a "scale worm". This species often lives as a commensal of another marine animal.

== Description ==
At least thirty pairs of elytra, scale-like modifications to the dorsal cirri, conceal the animal's body. These are on alternate segments and do not meet dorsally, leaving the central line of the body uncovered. A. vittata is a pale yellowish colour, with a few faint transverse bands, and a dark stripe located across segments 7 and 8. It can grow to a length of 8 to 10 cm (3 to 4 in) but is usually shorter. It can be distinguished from the otherwise similar Arctonoe pulchra by the absence of a dark spot on each scale.

== Distribution ==
A. vittata is native to the eastern Pacific Ocean. Its range extends from the Bering Strait to Ecuador, and as far west as Japan. Its depth range is from the middle shore down to about 275 m (902 ft).

== Ecology ==
The species forms a commensal relationship with the gumboot chiton, living on its gills and pallial groove. It also lives in the ambulacral groove of Dermasterias imbricata, a starfish. Another host is the keyhole limpet Diodora aspera where it lives in the gill groove. It can be very large in comparison with the size of this particular host. If the limpet is attacked by a starfish, such as Pisaster ochraceus, the scale worm defends its host by biting the tube feet of the starfish, usually succeeding in driving it away.

Some other hosts have also been identified; these include the starfishes Henricia leviuscula, Luidia foliata, Pteraster tesselatus, Solaster stimpsoni and Solaster dawsoni and the abalone Haliotis kamtschatkana, as well as the terebellid worms Thelepus crispus and Neoamphitrite robusta. It seems to recognise its host species by some chemical cue in the water; if separated from its symbiont, it attempts to return to its original host or find its way to a new host of the same species. It is carnivorous, but does not feed on its symbiont, preferring to be transported to new feeding grounds and feed on the heads of polychaete tubeworms, or any suitable prey its host may encounter on its travels. It is an efficient walker but a poor swimmer.
