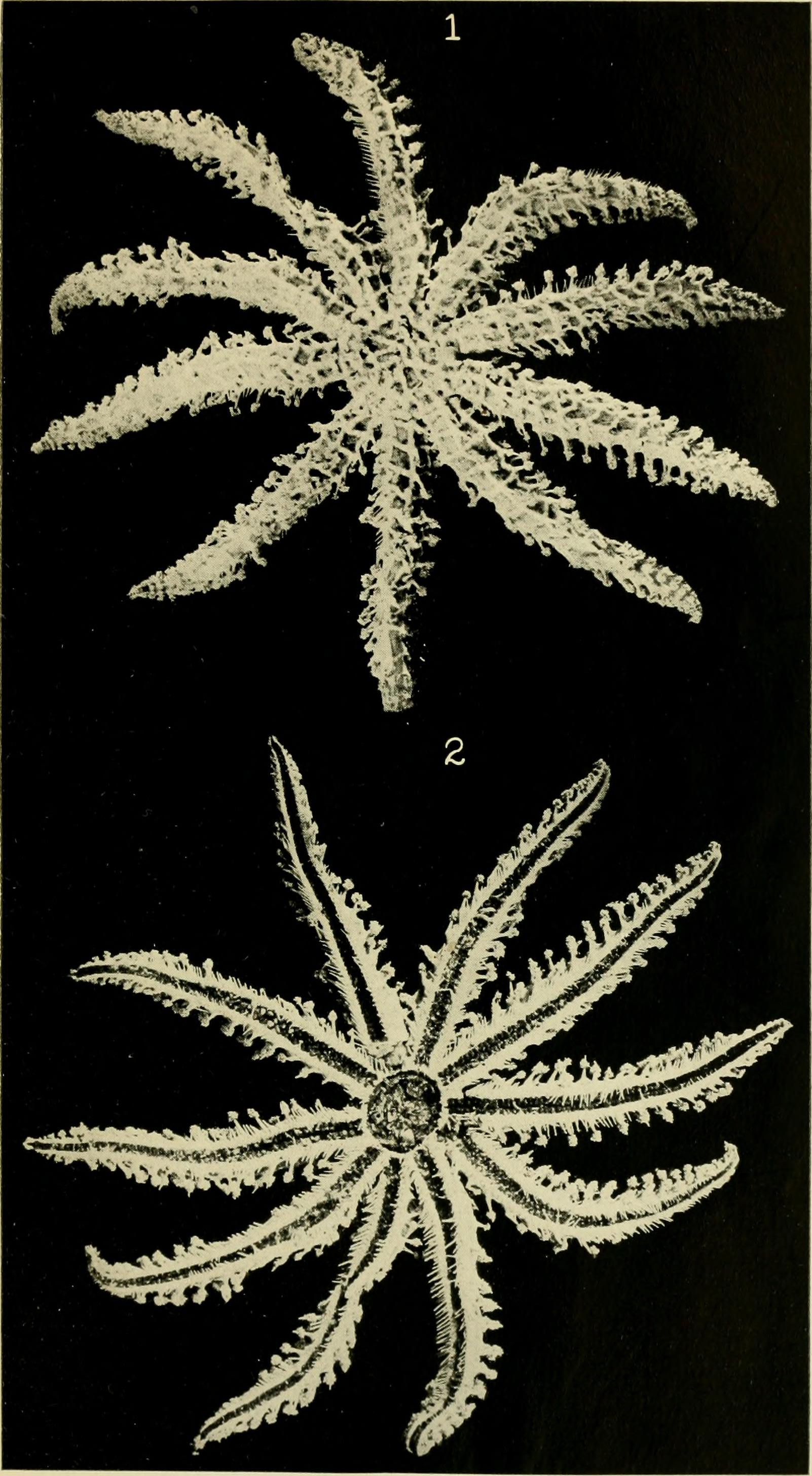

Scientific classification
- Kingdom: Animalia
- Phylum: Echinodermata
- Class: Asteroidea
- Order: Spinulosida
- Family: Echinasteridae
- Genus: Henricia
- Species: H. sexradiata

Binomial name
- Henricia sexradiata (Perrier, 1881)

Synonyms
- Cribrella sexradiata Perrier, 1881

= Henricia sexradiata =

Species of starfish

Henricia sexradiata is a species of starfish in the family Echinasteridae. It is native to the western Atlantic Ocean and the Gulf of Mexico.

== Distribution and habitat ==
Henricia sexradiata is found in the tropical and semi-tropical western Atlantic Ocean. Its range extends from South Carolina to Jamaica, the Gulf of Mexico and Nicaragua. It is found on sandy and shelly bottoms at depths between 30 and 366 m (100 and 1,200 ft).

== Ecology ==
Henricia sexradiata can undergo a form of asexual reproduction by undergoing fission, with part of the disc and one or more arms breaking off; the missing parts of each section then regenerate to form two new individuals.
