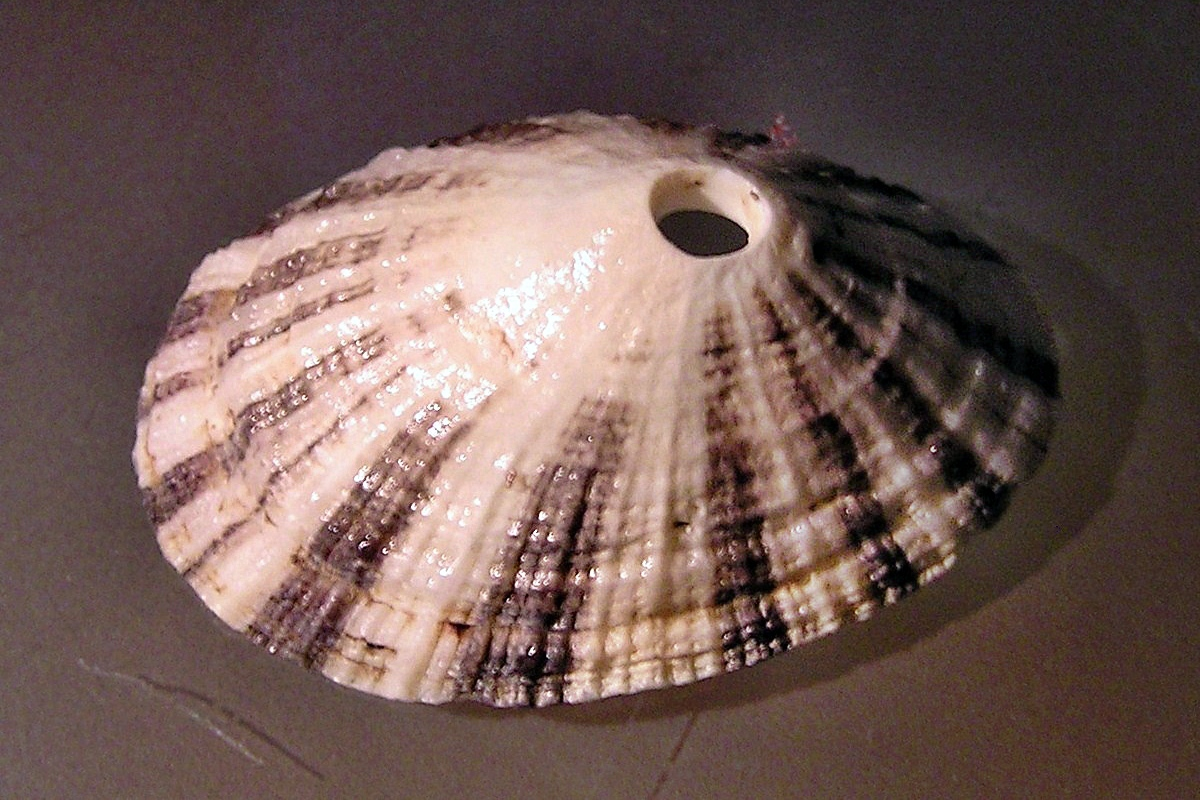

Scientific classification
- Kingdom: Animalia
- Phylum: Mollusca
- Class: Gastropoda
- Subclass: Vetigastropoda
- Order: Lepetellida
- Family: Fissurellidae
- Subfamily: Fissurellinae
- Genus: Diodora
- Species: D. aspera

Binomial name
- Diodora aspera (Rathke, 1833)

Synonyms
- Fissurella aspera Rathke, 1833 (original combination); Fissurella cratitia Gould, 1846

= Diodora aspera =

Species of gastropod

Diodora aspera, also known as the rough keyhole limpet, is a species of sea snail, a marine gastropod mollusk in the family Fissurellidae, the keyhole limpets. Although similar in appearance to a common limpet, it has a hole near the apex of its shell, and is only distantly related. It often has a scaled polychaete worm Arctonoe vittata living inside its shell as a commensal. In the event that it is attacked by a starfish, it extends flaps of mantle to defend itself, and the worm also helps drive the predator away.

== Description ==
Diodora aspera has a cone-shaped shell growing to a length of about 7 cm (2.8 in). Near the apex is an aperture about one tenth of the length of the shell, which is used for respiration and the elimination of waste. There is a broad foot which exerts suction on the rock surface, and the mantle is large enough to cover the margin of the shell. The surface of the shell is sculptured with coarse ribs and is usually greyish-brown or grey, often with dark and pale radiating bands of colour. The margin of the shell is crenulate and the interior is white.

== Distribution ==
This species is native to the northeastern Pacific Ocean from Alaska to Mexico. It occurs in the lower part of the intertidal zone and the shallow sub-littoral, down to about 12 m (40 ft). It typically clings to the lower part and underside of rocks, but is sometimes found on the holdfasts and stalks of kelp. When the tide is out and it is exposed, it tends to always attach itself to the same spot, where its shell neatly fits the contours of the rock.

== Ecology ==
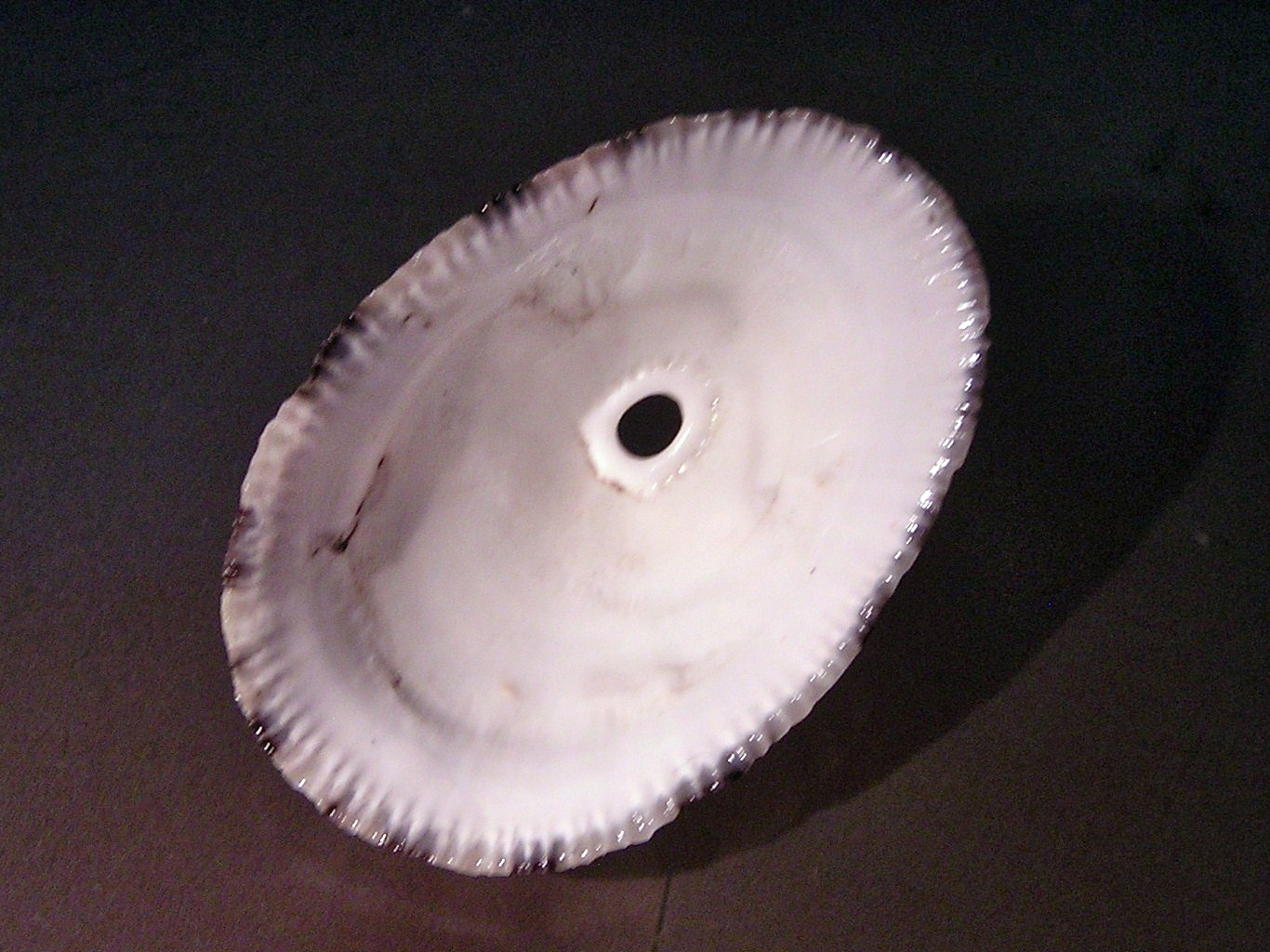
Diodora aspera, underside

When the tide comes in, this keyhole limpet crawls around, scraping bryozoans and algae off the rock surface with its radula. Certain species of sponges are also consumed. The sexes are separate and individuals with ripe gonads occur throughout the year. The eggs and sperm are shed into the sea where fertilisation takes place, and the larvae settle on the sea bed.

This keyhole limpet is host to the ectoparasitic copepod Anthessius nortoni. The scaled polychaete worm Arctonoe vittata acts as a commensal to D. aspera, living between the foot and the shell. This worm is relatively large, growing to a length of up to 10 cm (4 in), and may need to bend in order to fit. The worm is a predator, but does not attack its host, instead searching for prey to target as the limpet moves around. It is however willing to defend its host if a predacious starfish approaches, by biting at its tube feet.

The keyhole limpet is also able to defend itself against attacks by starfish. On the approach of certain species of starfish, it swiftly extends and folds its mantle upwards to cover the shell, while another flap of mantle descends to cover the foot. At the same time, the inhalent syphon is extended through the aperture and covers the apex of the shell. As a result of these defensive actions, the starfish is unable to get a grip on the limpet shell with its tube feet; it is also possible that there is some chemical deterrent present in the mantle. At any rate, the starfish desists, and the limpet lowers its mantle after about twenty minutes. Not all starfish elicit this response, which is likely to be mediated by some chemical cue.
