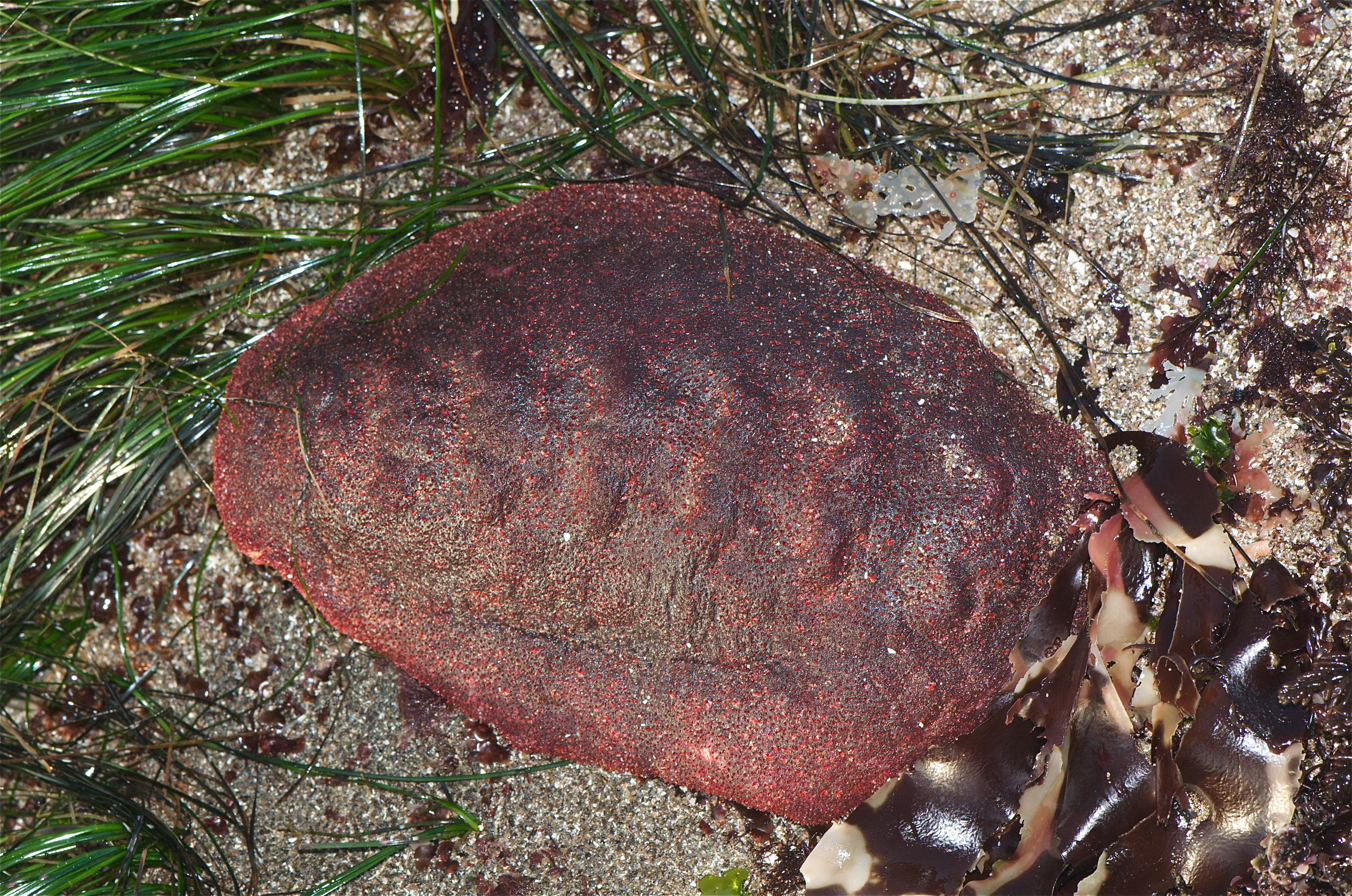

Conservation status
- Secure (NatureServe)

Scientific classification
- Kingdom: Animalia
- Phylum: Mollusca
- Class: Polyplacophora
- Order: Chitonida
- Family: Acanthochitonidae
- Genus: Cryptochiton von Middendorff, 1847
- Species: C. stelleri

Binomial name
- Cryptochiton stelleri (von Middendorff, 1847)

Synonyms
- Chiton stelleri von Middendorf, 1847

= Gumboot chiton =

Species of mollusc

The gumboot chiton (Cryptochiton stelleri), also known as the giant western fiery chiton or giant Pacific chiton, is the largest of the chitons, growing to 36 cm (14 in) and capable of reaching a weight of more than 2 kg (4.4 lb). It is found along the shores of the northern Pacific Ocean from Central California to Alaska, across the Aleutian Islands to the Kamchatka Peninsula and south to Japan. It inhabits the lower intertidal and subtidal zones of rocky coastlines. The gumboot chiton's appearance has led some tidepoolers to refer to it, fondly, as the "wandering meatloaf". The name "gumboot chiton" seems to derive from a resemblance to part of a rubber Wellington boot or "gum rubber" boot.

Chitons are molluscs that have eight armored plates (called valves) running in a flexible line down their back. Unlike most chitons, the gumboot's valves are completely hidden by its leathery upper skin or girdle that usually is reddish-brown or brown, but occasionally is orange in color.

Chitons have long arrays of fine teeth that are partially made of magnetite, making its teeth hard enough to scrape algae off rocks. The styli enclosing their teeth contain the mineral santabarbaraite, making the gumboot the first organism known to use this material.

== Taxonomy ==
The Latin name Cryptochiton stelleri means Steller's hidden chiton. "Steller" is in honor of the eighteenth-century German zoologist Georg Wilhelm Steller, who first described many species of the northern Pacific seashore. "Hidden" or "concealed" refers to the fact that the eight shelly plates characteristic of chitons are not visible, atypically being totally internal in this genus of chiton. Many taxonomic names for chitons are based on the appearance of their plates or valves, so it is most likely that the "hidden" portion of the name refers to the valves being completely obscured by the gumboot's girdle.

== Life ==
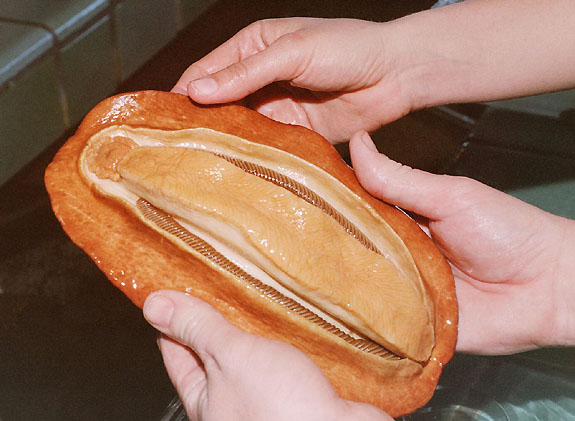
The underside of a live Cryptochiton stelleri, showing the foot, in the center, surrounded by the gills and mantle, the mouth is visible above and to the left of the foot

The gumboot chiton's underside is orange or yellow and consists mostly of a large foot similar to that of other molluscs such as snails or slugs, with gills found in grooves running along the outer edge of the foot. The gumboot chiton is found clinging to rocks, moving slowly in search of its primary diet of algae that is scraped off rocks with its rasp-like retractable radula, which are covered with rows of magnetite-tipped teeth. It also eats other marine vegetation such as sea lettuce and giant kelp. A nocturnal creature, the gumboot generally feeds at night and often remains in a hiding place during the day—although on foggy days it may be found exposed in tide pools or on rocks.

The gumboot may live for more than 40 years. Several other animal species have been observed living within the gumboot's gills; the relationship is thought to be commensal: benefiting from but not harming the chiton. One researcher found that more than a quarter of gumboots hosted an Arctonoe vittata, a pale yellow scale worm that can grow up to 10 cm (3.9 in) length. Sometimes Opisthopus transversus, a small crab, may be found within the gills of the gumboot.

The gumboot chiton's bony armoring plates, called "butterfly shells" due to their shape, sometimes are found washed up on beaches, as may whole chitons. The gumboot keeps a weaker grip on the rocks that make up its home than most chitons do and therefore, it is not unusual for them to be knocked loose by heavy waves.

== Predators ==
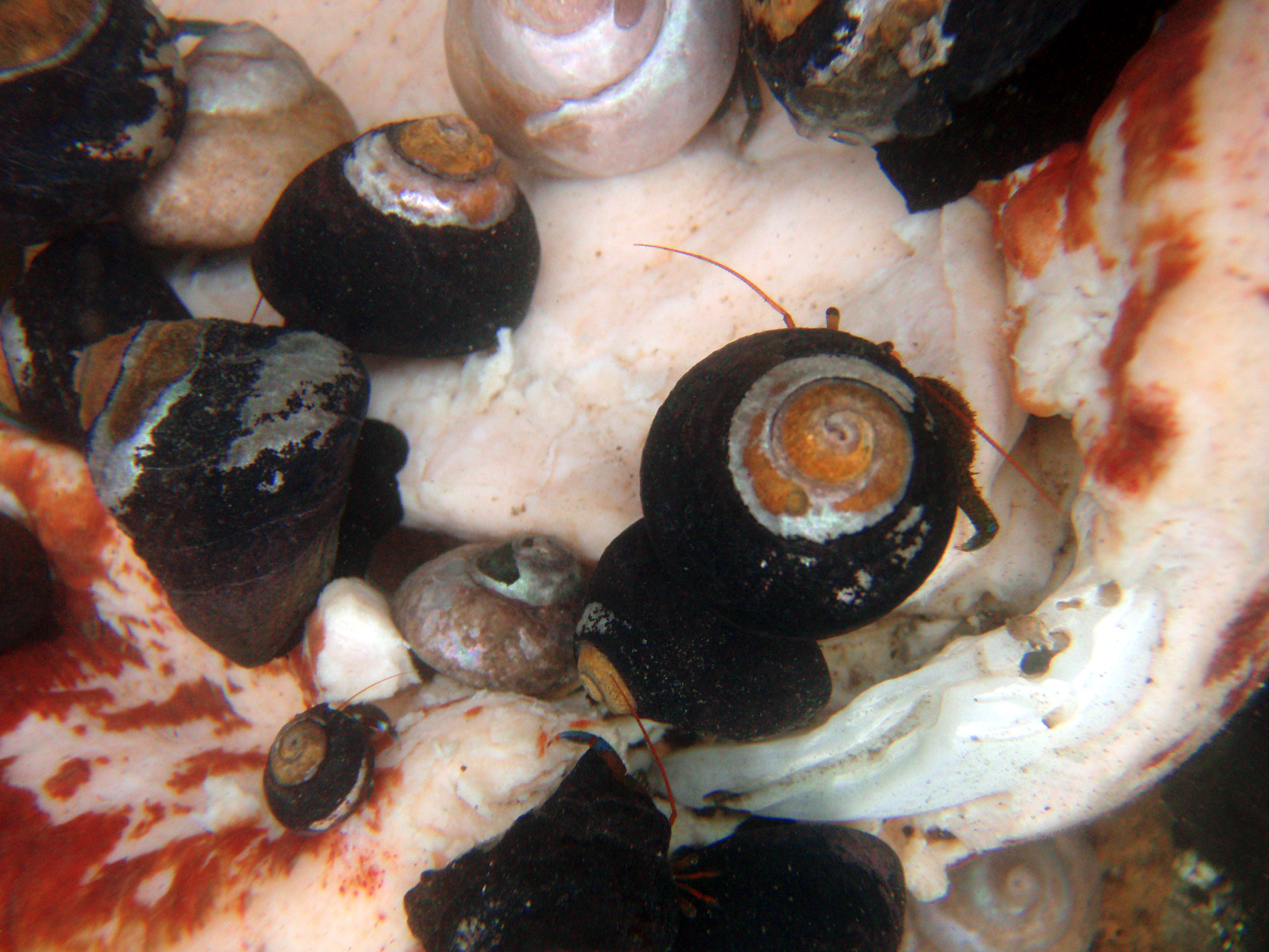
Hermit crabs and live Tegula funebralis snails on a dead gumboot chiton, Cryptochiton stelleri, in a tide pool at low tide in central California

It has few natural predators, the most common being the lurid rocksnail, Paciocinebrina lurida—although the small snail's efforts to consume the chiton generally are limited to the outer mantle only. Sometimes it is reported that the lurid rocksnail is the gumboot chiton's only predator, but others list such animals as the sea star Pisaster ochraceus, some octopus species, and the sea otter as predators upon the gumboot.

== Human use as food ==
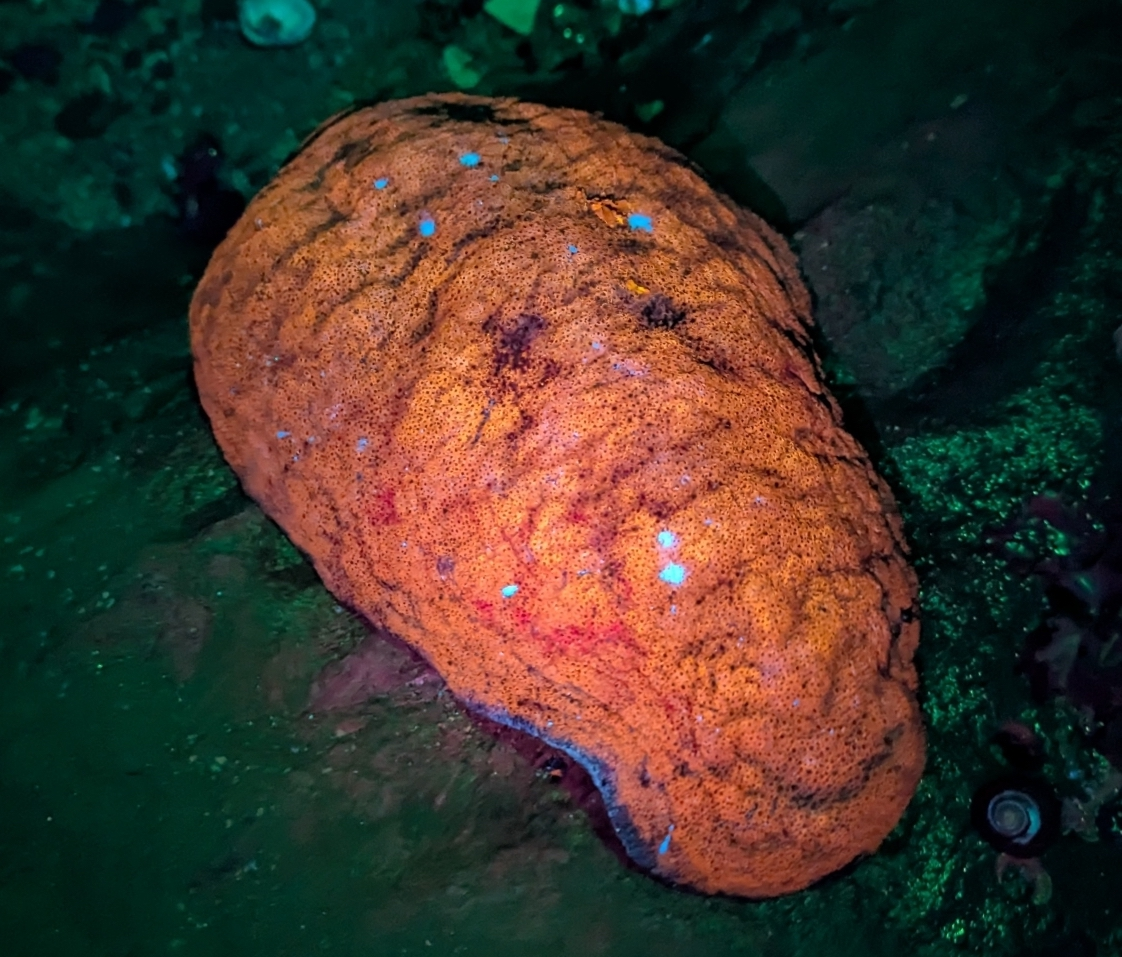
The dorsal surface of Cryptochiton stelleri fluoresces bright orange under 365 nm UV light

Its flesh is edible and has been used as food by Native Americans, as well as by Russian settlers in Southeast Alaska. However, it generally is not considered palatable, having a texture described as extremely tough and rubbery.

The writers of Between Pacific Tides detailed their culinary assessment of the gumboot: "After one experiment the writers decided to reserve the animals for times of famine; one tough, paper-thin steak was all that could be obtained from a large cryptochiton, and it radiated such a penetrating fishy odor that it was discarded before it reached the frying pan."

== Notes ==
=== References ===
- Fields, Carmen (1999). Alaska's Seashore Creatures: a guide to selected marine invertebrates. Alaska Northwest Books. ISBN 0-88240-516-0.
- Lichen, Patricia (2001). Brittle Stars & Mudbugs: an Uncommon Field Guide to Northwest Shorelines & Wetlands. Illustrated by Linda M. Feltner. Seattle, WA: Sasquatch Books. ISBN 9781570612206.
- Perrin, William; Würsig, Bernd; Thewissen, J. G. M. (2002). Encyclopedia of Marine Mammals. Academic Press. ISBN 978-0-12-551340-1.
- Ricketts, Edward; Calvin, Jack; Hedgepeth, Joel (1992). Between Pacific Tides (5th ed.). Stanford University Press. ISBN 0-8047-2068-1.
