= Cantabrian Sea =

Sea in the southern Bay of Biscay off the coast of Spain

- Location within Spain
- Coordinates: 44.0323°N 4.3506°W
- Type: Sea
- Primary inflows: Agüera, Asón, Bidasoa, Cares-Deva, Eo, Escudo, Miera, Nalón, Nansa, Navia, Pas, Pisueña, Saja-Besaya, Sella, Piles
- Basin countries: Spain, France
- Max. length: 800 km (497 mi)
- Max. depth: 2,789 m (9,150 ft)

The Cantabrian Sea (Note: Spanish: Mar Cantábrico; Galician: Mar Cantábrico; Asturian: Mar Cantábricu; Basque: Kantauri; French: Mer Cantabrique; Occitan: Mar Cantabrica.) is the term used mostly in Spain to describe the coastal sea of the Atlantic Ocean that borders the northern coast of Spain and the southwest side of the Atlantic coast of France, included in the Bay of Biscay. It extends from Cabo Ortegal in the province of A Coruña, to the mouth of the river Adour, near the city of Bayonne on the coast of the department of Pyrénées-Atlantiques in French Basque Country. The Cantabrian Sea contains the Avilés Canyons System.

The sea borders 800 km (500 mi) of coastline shared by the Spanish provinces of A Coruña, Lugo, Asturias, Cantabria, Biscay and Gipuzkoa, and the French area of Labourd.

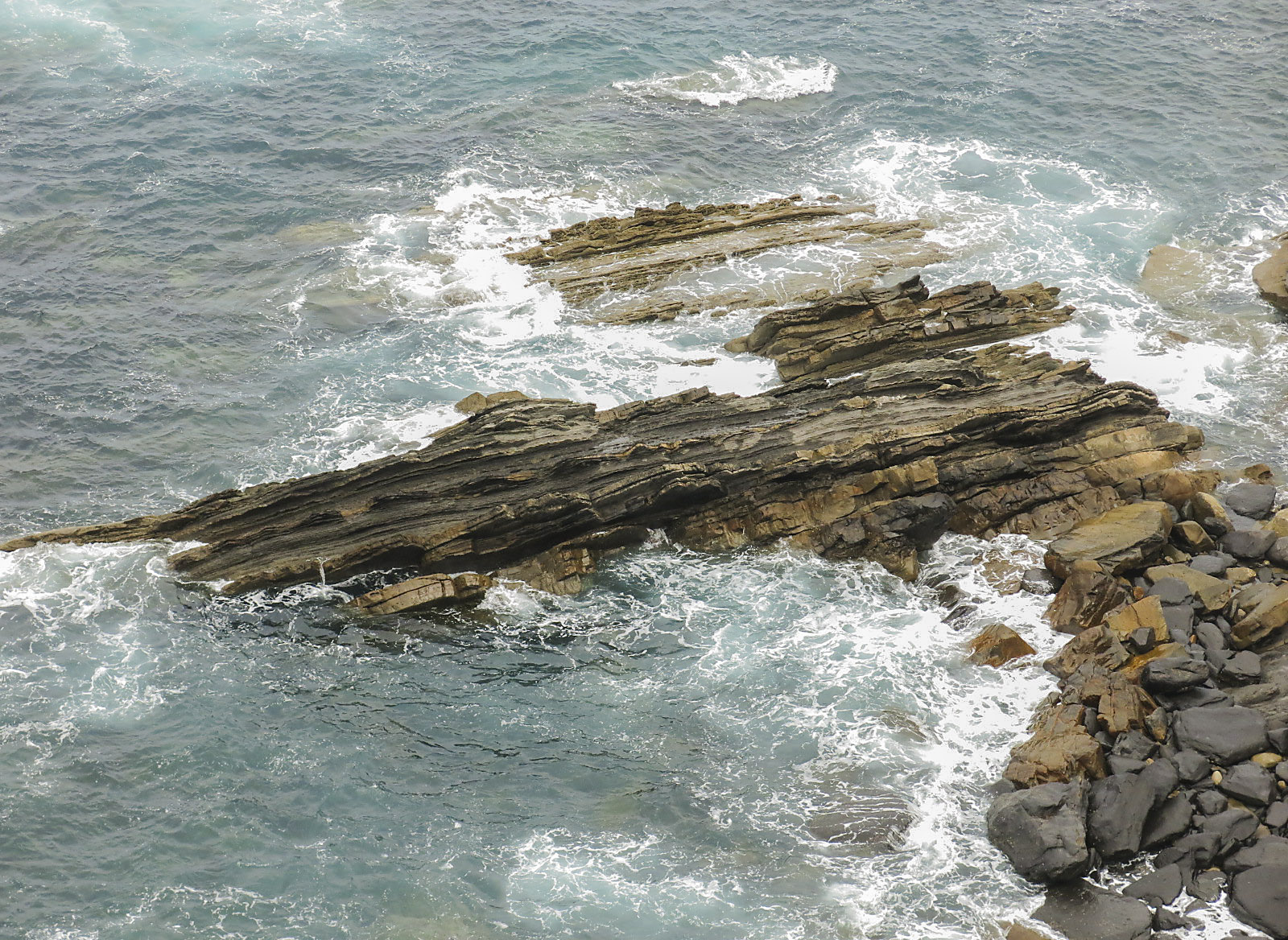
Coast of Ribadesella, Asturias
