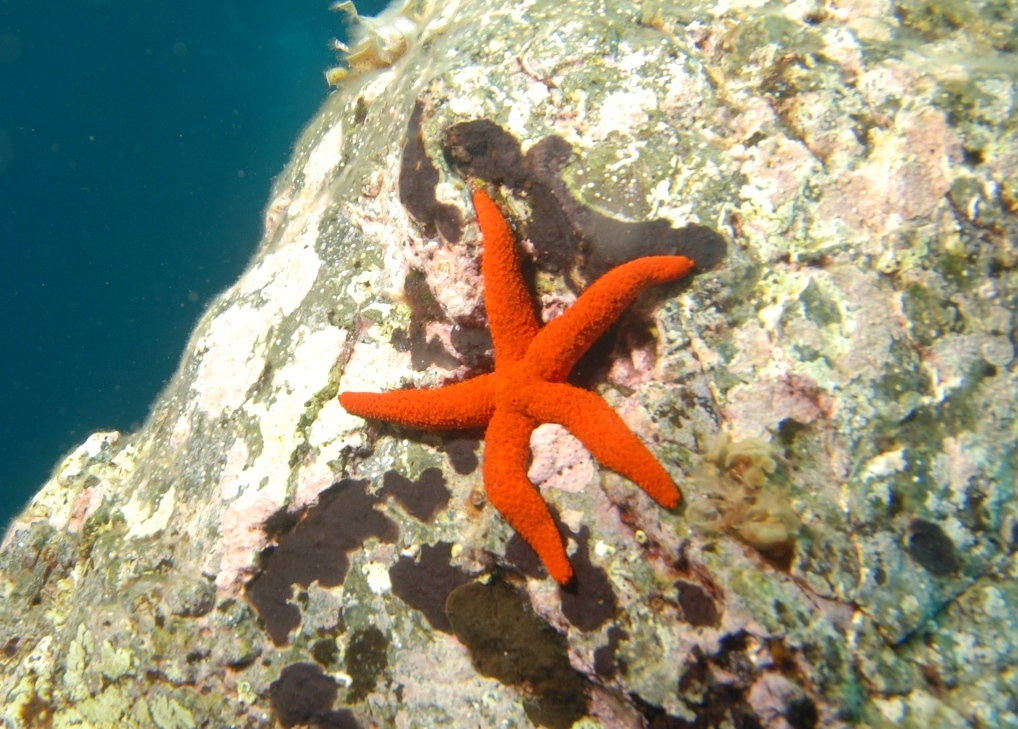
- Echinaster sepositus

Scientific classification
- Kingdom: Animalia
- Phylum: Echinodermata
- Class: Asteroidea
- Order: Spinulosida
- Family: Echinasteridae; Verrill, 1870

Genera
- see text

Synonyms
- Metrodiridae Sladen, 1889; Metrodirinae Sladen, 1889

= Echinasteridae =

Family of starfishes

The Echinasteridae are a family of starfish in the monotypic order Spinulosida. The family includes eight genera and about 133 species found on the seabed in various habitats around the world.

== Taxonomy ==
Echinasteridae contains eight genera and about 133 species. The two genera Echinaster and Henricia are the most speciose, forming species complexes. Echinaster has a largely tropical distribution and occurs in shallow seas including continental shelves, while Henricia is cosmopolitan, occurring mostly in cold waters, including polar habitats and abyssal locations. Aleutihenricia and Odontohenricia are native to the northeastern Pacific Ocean, in the vicinity of the Aleutian Islands.

== Characteristics ==
Echinasterids are mostly five-armed starfish with thick but small discs, and long, slender, often cylindrical arms. The cuticle is covered on both the aboral (upper) and oral (lower) surfaces by a latticework of ossicles which are either flattened or rounded plates, or pseudopaxilliform (peglike) plates with broad bases. The mouth is surrounded by tight-fitting triangular plates. The pores through which the tube feet project are small and the plates on either side of the ambulacral grooves are angular and bear spines. Echinasterids do not have pedicellariae.

== Ecology ==
Echinasterids are epifaunal animals that live on the seabed, on rock, sand, gravel or mud. They graze on encrusting invertebrates such as sponges, tunicates and molluscs, as well as feeding on detritus. Additionally, Echinaster uses cilia to create a current to draw zooplankton and organic particles into its mouth. Henricia is a scavenger and a filter feeder.

The sexes are separate in these starfish. The eggs are large and yolky and development is by way of brachiolaria larvae. In some species these are planktonic, but in others, the females brood their young in a brood chamber under their arms. Echinaster luzonicus is renowned for shedding its arms in a process known as autotomy, being then able to regenerate a new disc from a single arm. This is a form of asexual reproduction and E. luzonicus is not known to reproduce in any other way. Another echinasterid that reproduces asexually is Henricia sexradiata, but in this case, the disc also splits apart.

== Genera ==
The following genera are recognised by the World Register of Marine Species:

- Aleutihenricia Clark & Jewett, 2010
- Dictyaster Wood-Mason & Alcock, 1891
- Echinaster Müller & Troschel, 1840
- Henricia Gray, 1840
- Metrodira Gray, 1840
- Odontohenricia Rowe & Albertson, 1988
- Plectaster Sladen, 1889
- Rhopiella Fisher, 1940

== Gallery ==
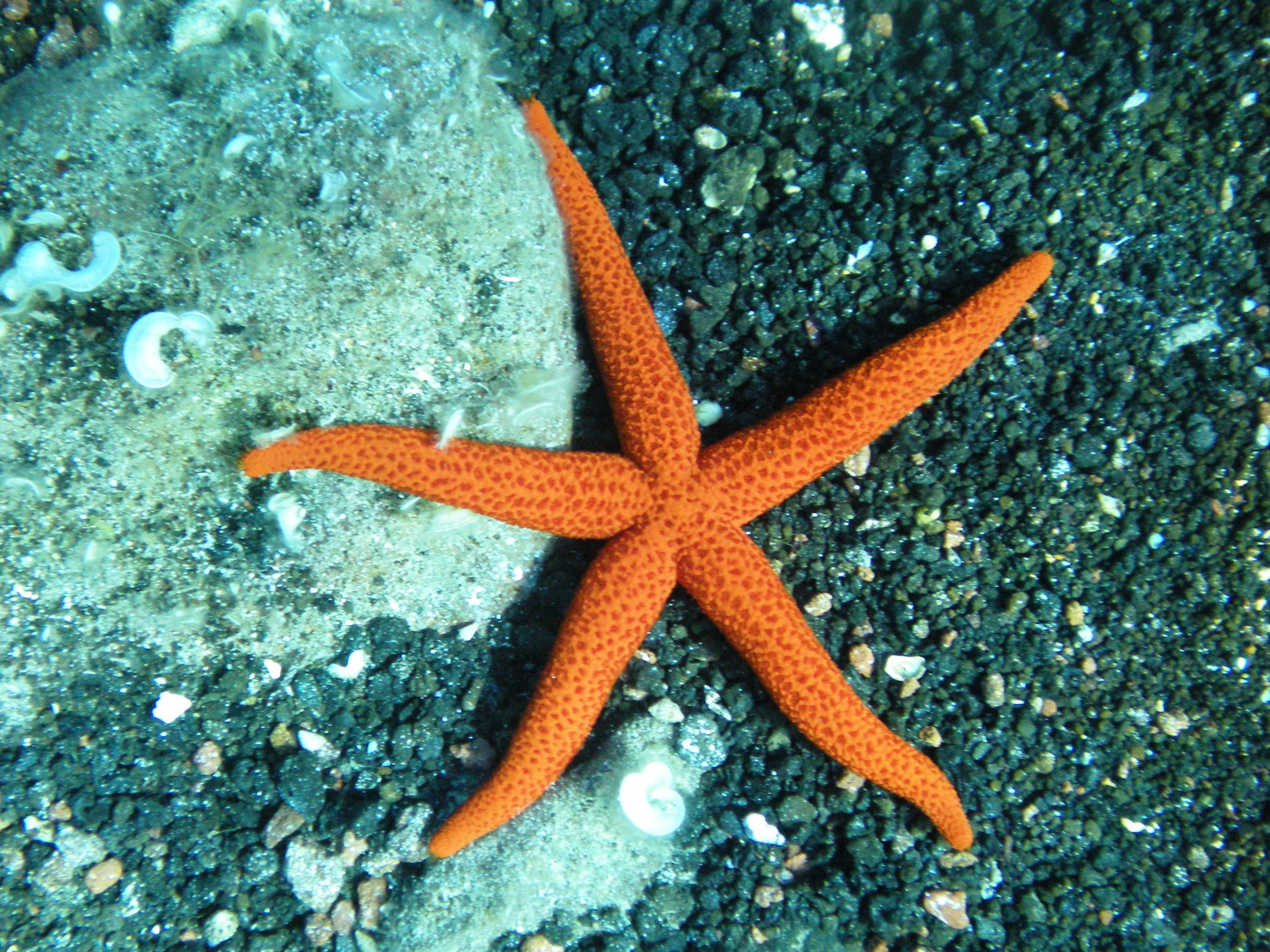
Echinaster sepositus

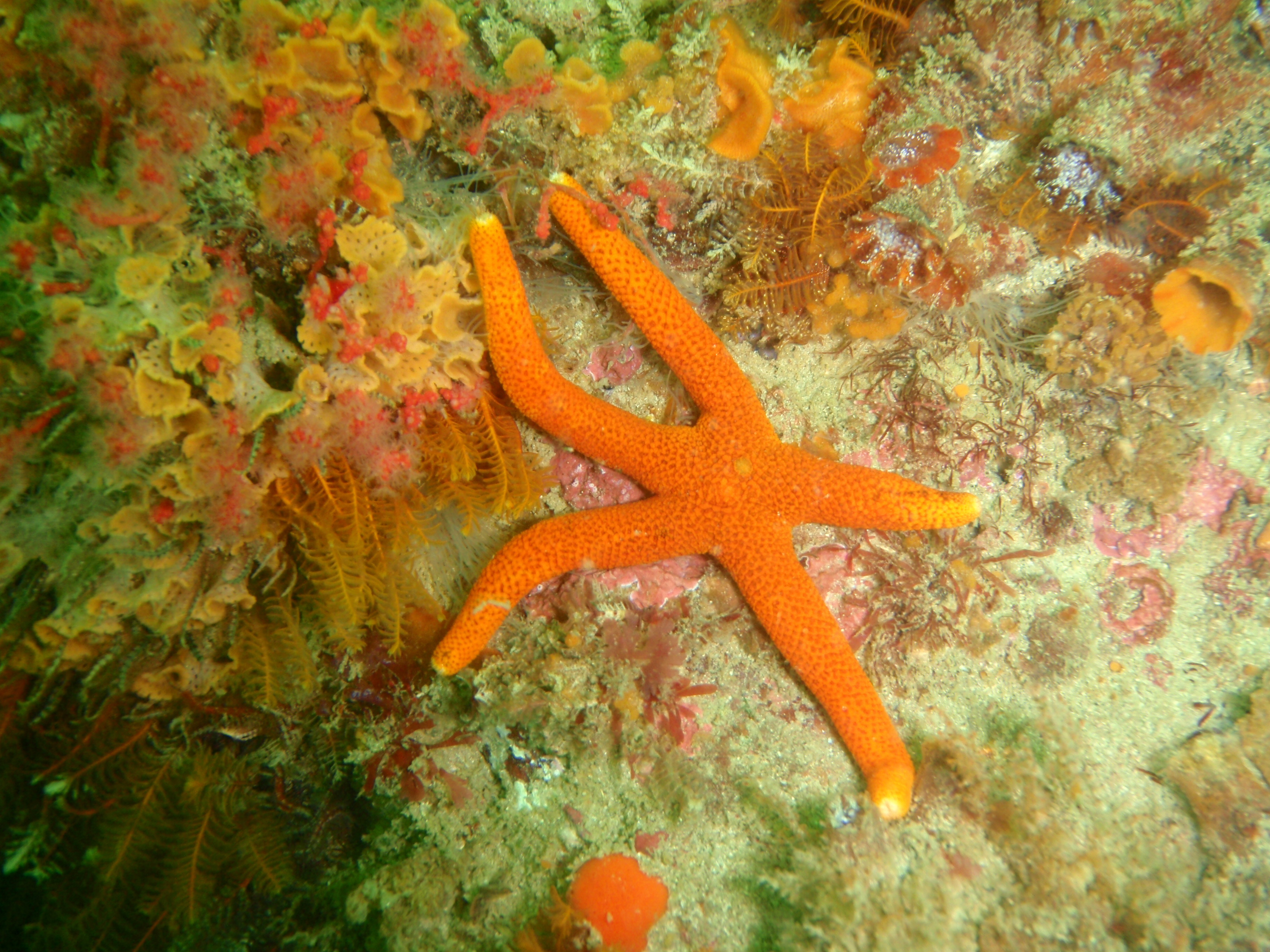
Henricia ornata

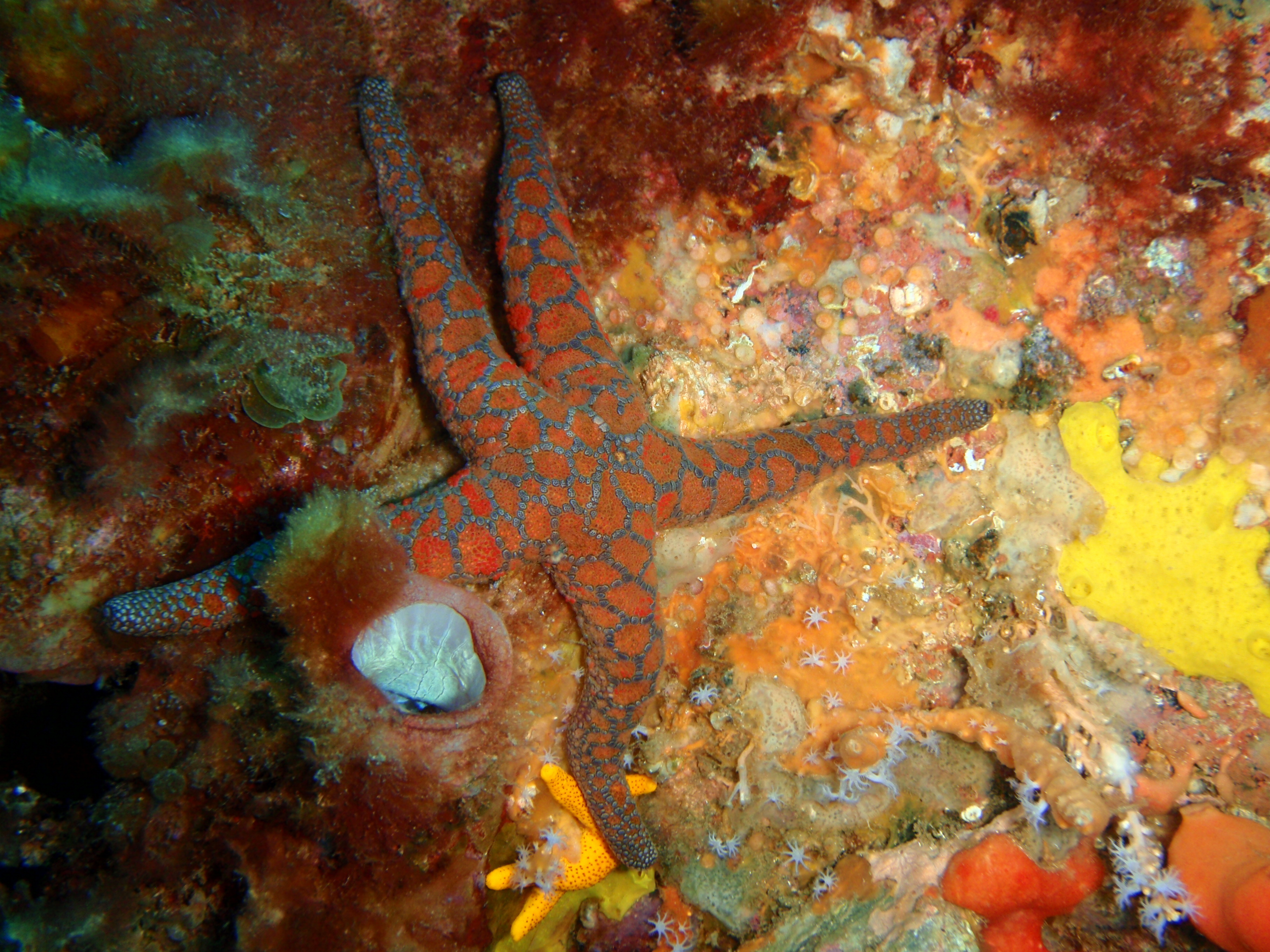
Plectaster decanus
