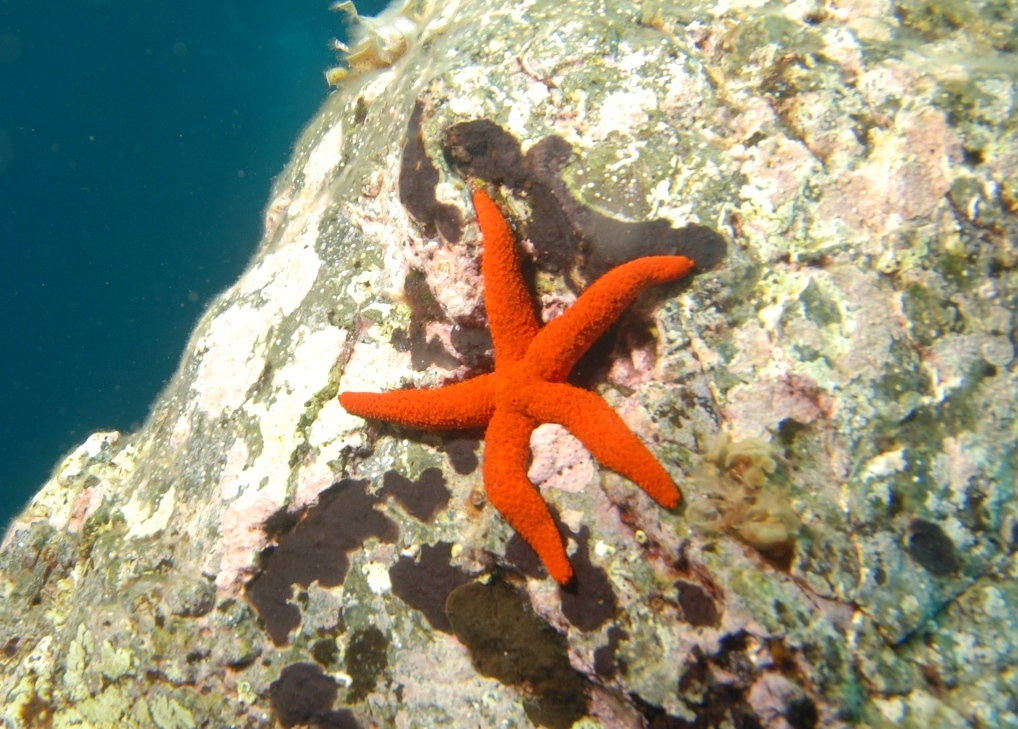
- Echinaster sepositus

Scientific classification
- Kingdom: Animalia
- Phylum: Echinodermata
- Class: Asteroidea
- Superorder: Spinulosacea
- Order: Spinulosida; Perrier, 1884

Families
- 2, see text.

= Spinulosida =

Order of starfishes

The Spinulosida are an order of sea stars containing at least 120 species in seven genera and one family.

Spinulosids completely lack pedicellariae and have a delicate skeletal arrangement. Their name comes from the presence of numerous low spines on the aboral (upper) surface. No fossil spinulosids have yet been found.

== Taxonomy ==
The following family is recognised by the World Register of Marine Species:

- Echinasteridae Verrill, 1870
