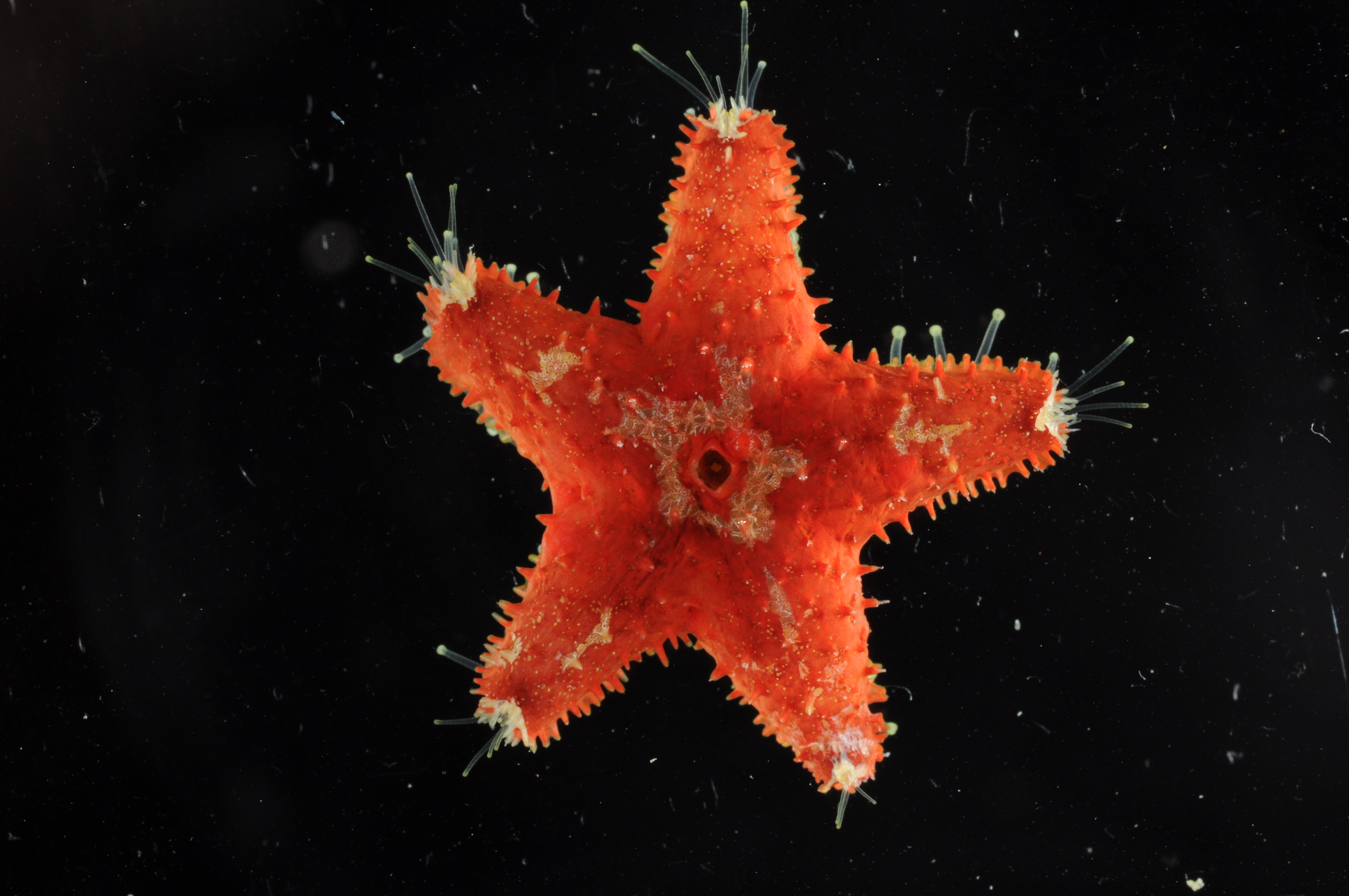

Scientific classification
- Kingdom: Animalia
- Phylum: Echinodermata
- Class: Asteroidea
- Order: Velatida
- Family: Pterasteridae
- Genus: Euretaster
- Species: E. insignis

Binomial name
- Euretaster insignis (Sladen, 1882)

Synonyms
- Retaster insignis Sladen, 1882

= Euretaster insignis =

Species of starfish

Euretaster insignis, commonly known as the striking sea star, is a species of starfish in the family Pterasteridae found in the central west Pacific Ocean. It is one of only three species in the order Velatida to be found in shallow water in the tropics. The young are brooded in a cavity underneath a "supradorsal" membrane.

== Taxonomy and evolution ==
This starfish was first described in 1882 by marine biologist Percy Sladen as Retaster insignis, Retaster being a small segregate genus of Pteraster. In 1940, the genus had to change its name after Walter Kenrick Fisher noted that the type species of Retaster he had himself designated (as Perrier, the original coiner, had failed to do so), Pteraster capensis was in fact a sound species of Pteraster, which automatically made the former genus a synonym of the latter. The genus known as Retaster required a new name, and the one Fisher coined was Euretaster, with R. insignis as its type species.

The order Velatida are presumed to be the earliest lineage of living sea stars to diverge from the ancestral line, their closest living relatives being the abyssal sea daisies in the order Peripodida. The three members of the genus Euretaster are the only tropical, shallow-water species in the order Velatida, the remaining members living at abyssal depths. It might be presumed that the order has its origin in deep water, however there are numerous shallow-water fossils of velatidans dating from the Cretaceous period and it seems that these ancient forms have largely been driven out of shallow water habitats by competition from recent, more-advanced taxa.

== Description ==
This small starfish is star-shaped and has five stubby arms. The aboral (upper) surface has an inflated appearance due to it being covered by a "supradorsal" membrane; this is supported by bundles of spinelets borne on the flat plates that are arranged in a mosaic pattern on the cuticle below. This membrane encloses a supradorsal cavity filled with sea water, which is connected to the water column by a central osculum (aperture), which opens and closes periodically. The membrane has a reticulated pattern of ridges and small conical protrusions. It is patterned in some combination of red, white and brown.

== Distribution and habitat ==
Euretaster insignis is native to the tropical western central Pacific Ocean from the intertidal zone down to about 132 m (430 ft). It is found on coral reefs, rocky coasts, sand and muddy rubble.

== Ecology ==
The sexes are separate in Euretaster insignis. Instead of being planktonic, the developing embryos are brooded in the supradorsal cavity, and even receive nourishment from the mother in the form of a mucosal secretion from the cuticle; they receive this because their presence irritates the lining of the cavity causing it to secrete the fluid in a process that has been described as "cannibalistic ectoparasitism". The larvae are brooded until they are about 1 cm (0.4 in) in diameter at which time they are liberated as juvenile starfish into the sea.
