= Slime star =

Slime star may refer to various starfish known for their ability to defend themselves by expelling large amounts of mucus:

- Pterasteridae, a family of starfish sometimes generally called the "slime stars," including:
  - Hymenaster, a genus sometimes referred to collectively as the "slime stars"
  - Pteraster, a genus sometimes referred to collectively as the "slime stars"
  - Pteraster tesselatus, a North Pacific species with the common names "slime star" and "cushion star"
- The leather star (Dermasterias imbricata), a North Pacific species less commonly referred to as a "slime star"
