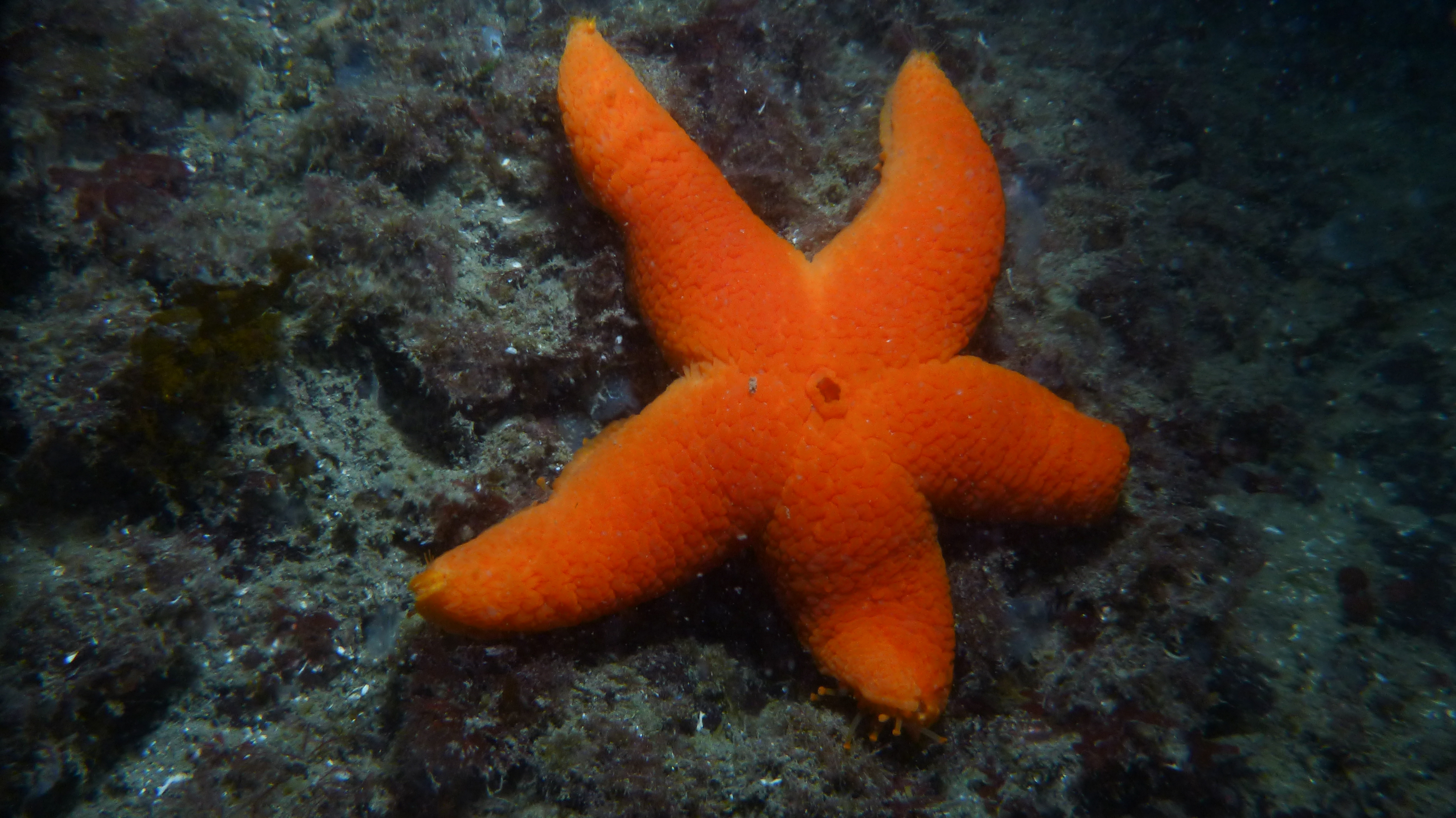

Scientific classification
- Kingdom: Animalia
- Phylum: Echinodermata
- Class: Asteroidea
- Order: Velatida
- Family: Pterasteridae
- Genus: Pteraster
- Species: P. militaris

Binomial name
- Pteraster militaris O.F. Müller, 1776

Synonyms
- Asterias militaris O.F. Müller, 1776; Asteriscus militaris Müller & Troschel, 1842; Pteraster aporus Ludwig, 1886; Pterasterides aporus Verrill, 1909

= Pteraster militaris =

Species of starfish

Pteraster militaris, the wrinkled star, is a species of starfish in the family Pterasteridae. It is found in the northern Pacific Ocean, the Arctic Ocean, the Barents Sea, and the northern Atlantic Ocean.

== Description ==
Pteraster militaris is a robust starfish with a wide disc, a large central pore and five short, wrinkled, triangular arms. The aboral (upper) surface is dotted with papulae, each topped with four short spines and above this is a papery covering giving the starfish an inflated, bulky appearance. It grows to a diameter of 85 millimetres (3.3 in) and is usually orange, pale yellow or white, sometimes with red tips to its arms.

== Distribution ==
Pteraster militaris is found in rocky habitats in water down to a depth of 1,100 metres (3,600 ft) in the Arctic Ocean, the Bering Sea, the north west Pacific Ocean as far south as Oregon, the Barents Sea and the north east and north west Atlantic Ocean.

== Biology ==
Pteraster militaris feeds on various species of sponge including the cloud sponge (Aphrocallistes vastus) and the white reticulated sponge (Iophon cheliferum) and also on hydrozoans such as the pink branching hydrocoral (Stylaster norvigicus) and the purple encrusting hydrocoral (Stylantheca).

Pteraster militaris is unusual among starfishes in that it broods some of its young. About forty fertilised eggs are retained in the water-filled chamber below its papery outer skin and these develop into juveniles that may reach 1 cm (0.4 in) across before they make their way out through the central pore. Eggs that are too numerous to be brooded are released direct into the sea where they become planktonic larvae. The brooded juveniles seem to behave as ectoparasites of the female, feeding on maternal tissues in the brood chamber. They may also eat dead embryos, faecal material and mucus.
