= Xyloplax medusiformis =

Conservation status
- Data Deficient (NZ TCS)

Scientific classification
- Kingdom: Animalia
- Phylum: Echinodermata
- Class: Asteroidea
- Order: Peripodida
- Family: Xyloplacidae
- Genus: Xyloplax
- Species: X. medusiformis

Binomial name
- Xyloplax medusiformis Baker, Rowe & Clark, 1986

Species of starfish

Xyloplax medusiformis is a sea daisy, a member of an unusual group of marine taxa belonging to the phylum Echinodermata. It is found at bathyal depths in waters around New Zealand. It was first described in 1986 by Baker, Rowe and Clark and is the type taxon of the genus Xyloplax. Its generic name derives from the Greek "xylo" meaning wood and its specific name was chosen because its morphology superficially resembles that of a cnidarian medusa.

== Discovery ==
Specimens of Xyloplax medusiformis were first discovered by accident when a submersible craft was being used to collect samples of wood on the deep sea bed in the South Pacific near New Zealand. Nine individuals were discovered from five locations. At the time, these specimens puzzled researchers because of their lack of close affiliations to other echinoderms. Since then further members of the genus Xyloplax have been discovered on wood at bathyal depths, Xyloplax turnerae in the Atlantic Ocean off the Bahamas and Xyloplax janetae in the central Pacific Ocean.

== Taxonomy ==
Xyloplax medusiformis was the first sea daisy to be described. It was clearly an echinoderm but at first it was considered to be sufficiently different from starfish, class Asteroidea, as to warrant it being placed in a new class of its own, the Concentricycloidea. The main difference was that the water vascular system of asteroids has a single ring canal circling the mouth connected to radial arms with short lateral side arms while that of the sea daisy had two ring canals surrounding the mouth, linked by five inter-ring canals. The concentric arrangement of plates on the surface of the sea daisy was novel and it had a single row of podia (tube feet) rather than the two rows typical of asteroids.

DNA sequencing was done on Xyloplax medusiformis and on a range of about twenty other varied species of echinoderm. It was found that X. medusiformis was indubitably a member of class Asteroidea and was a sister taxon to Rathbunaster in the order Forcipulatida. It is considered that X. medusiformis may be paedomorphic, retaining larval characteristics into adulthood. Later it was confidently placed in Velatida (Molecular Phylogenetics and Evolution 115 (2017): 161–170).

== Description ==
Xyloplax medusiformis is a small, flattened disc or umbrella-shaped invertebrate growing to a diameter of about 9 millimetres (0.35 in). The aboral (upper) surface is covered with flat plates arranged in concentric rings and there are short marginal spines projecting from the periphery. Internally the water vascular system consists of two super-oral rings and no radial canals. There is no stomach, gut or anus and it is thought that the velum (membrane) that covers the oral (lower) surface is equivalent to an everted stomach. There are five pairs of gonads, each associated with a fluid-filled sac.

== Distribution and habitat ==
Xyloplax medusiformis is known from deep waters around New Zealand. It is found on pieces of decaying timber that have sunk to the seabed and are at least 1,000 metres (3,300 ft) beneath the surface. It is believed that it may feed on bacteria or the products of wood decay but very little is known of the biology of this echinoderm. Similar numbers of males and females have been discovered and it appears that there is a long phase of embryonic development during which time the females brood the embryos in their ovaries until they are nearly ready to undergo metamorphosis into juveniles.
