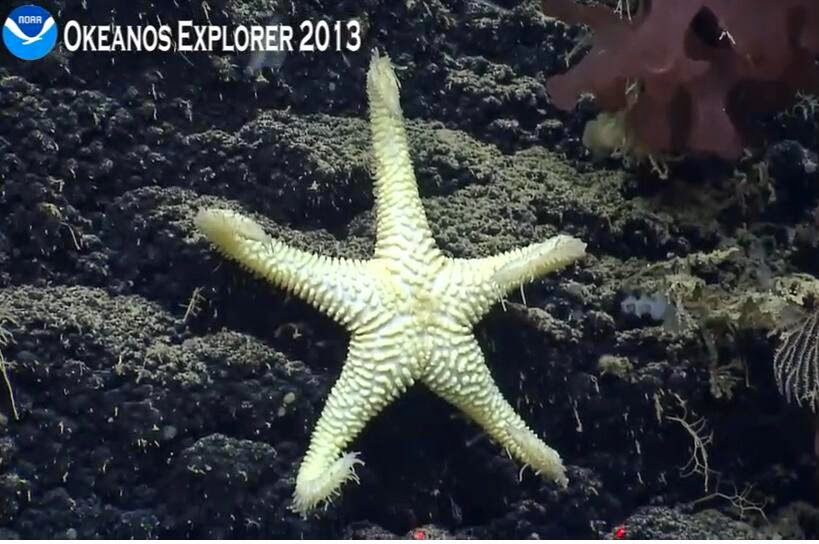
- Pythonaster sp. (probably P. atlantidis)

Scientific classification
- Kingdom: Animalia
- Phylum: Echinodermata
- Class: Asteroidea
- Order: Velatida
- Family: Myxasteridae
- Genus: Pythonaster; Sladen in Thomson & Murray, 1885

= Pythonaster =

Genus of starfishes

Pythonaster is a genus of deep-sea velatid sea stars containing three species.

== Taxonomy ==
List of species according to World Register of Marine Species:

- Pythonaster atlantidis A.H. Clark, 1948
- Pythonaster murrayi Sladen, 1889
- Pythonaster pacificus Downey, 1979

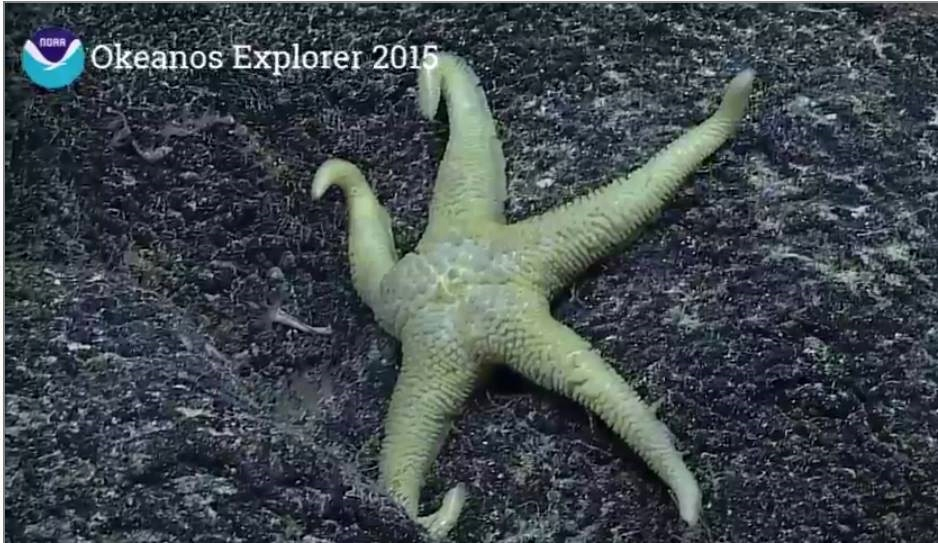
Pythonaster sp. observed off Hawaii.
