= Wigginsia =

Wigginsia may refer to the following genera:

- Wigginsia (sponge), in family Acarnidae
- Wigginsia, a plant, junior synonym of Parodia
