= Peribolaster lictor =

Scientific classification
- Kingdom: Animalia
- Phylum: Echinodermata
- Class: Asteroidea
- Order: Velatida
- Family: Korethrasteridae
- Genus: Peribolaster
- Species: P. lictor

Binomial name
- Peribolaster lictor Fell, 1958

Species of echinoderm

Peribolaster lictor is a species of echinoderm that is endemic to New Zealand and was first described by Barry Fell in 1958. The holotype specimen is held at the Canterbury Museum. A paratype specimen of this species was collected during the 1954 Chatham Islands expedition.
