= Euretaster =

Scientific classification
- Kingdom: Animalia
- Phylum: Echinodermata
- Class: Asteroidea
- Order: Velatida
- Family: Pterasteridae
- Genus: Euretaster; Fisher, 1940

Genus of starfishes

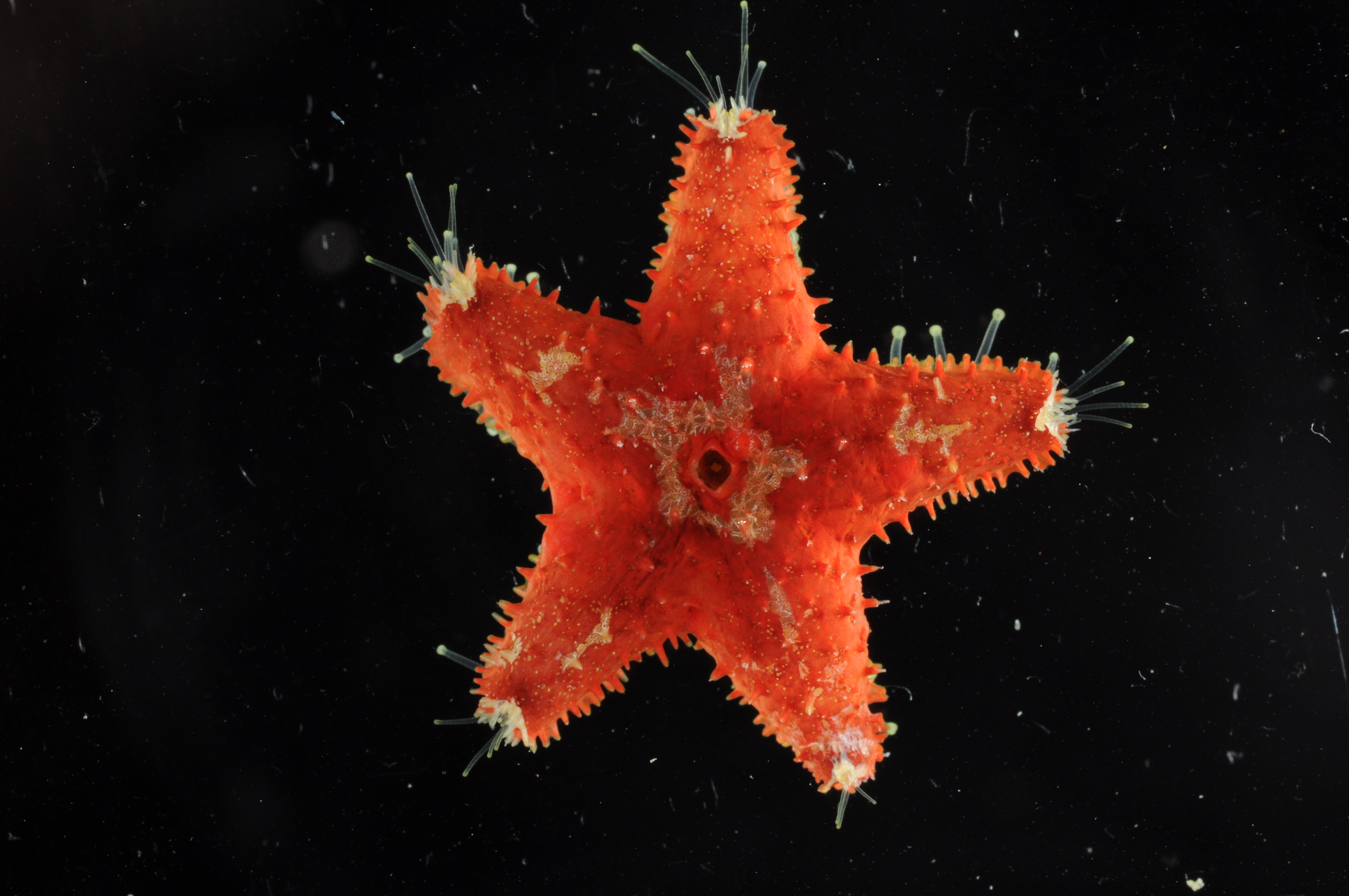

Euretaster is a genus of echinoderms belonging to the family Pterasteridae.

The species of this genus are found in Indian and Pacific Ocean.

Species:

- Euretaster attenuatus Jangoux, 1984
- Euretaster cribrosus (von Martens, 1867)
- Euretaster insignis (Sladen, 1882)
