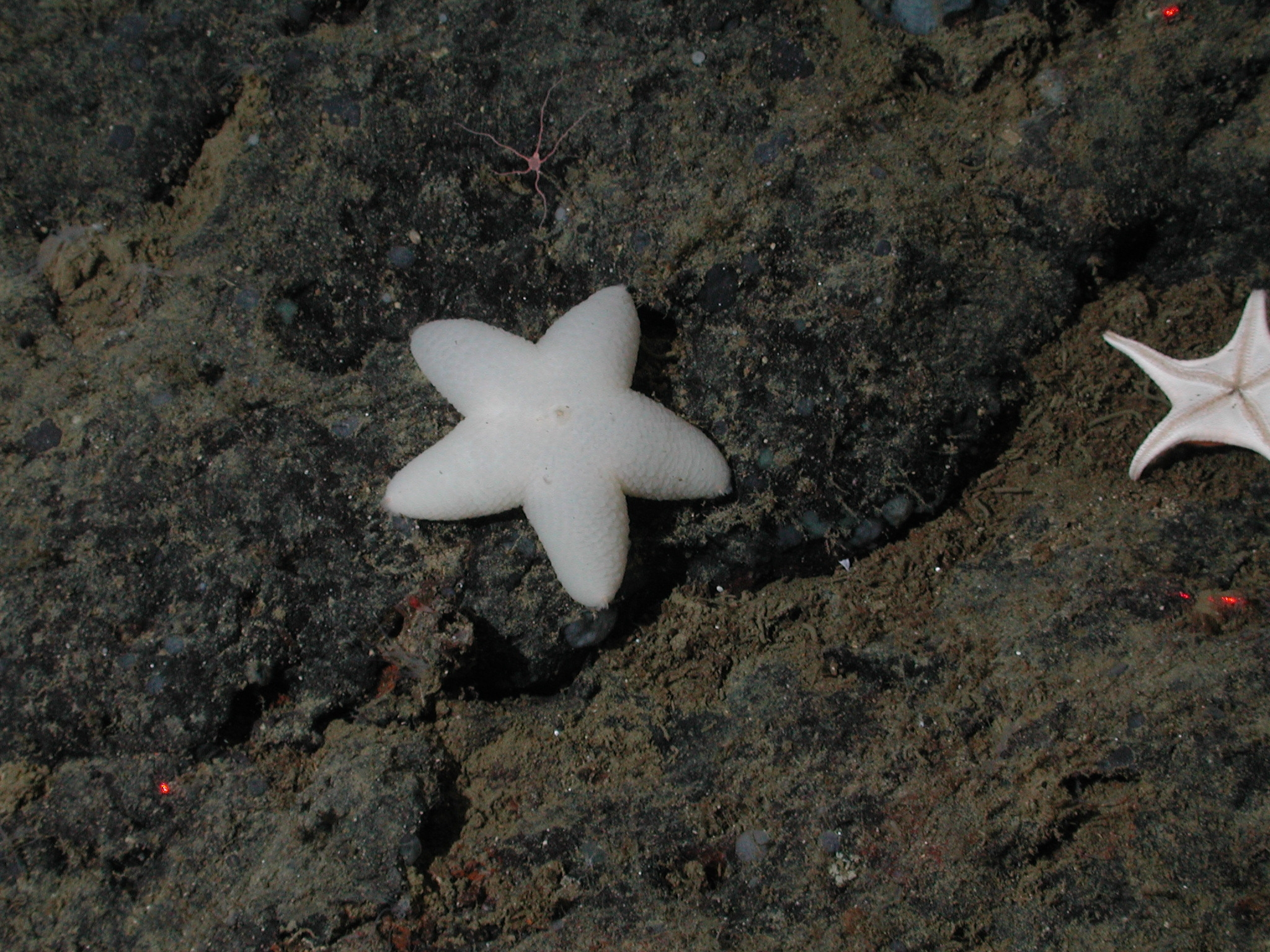

Scientific classification
- Kingdom: Animalia
- Phylum: Echinodermata
- Class: Asteroidea
- Order: Velatida
- Family: Pterasteridae
- Genus: Pteraster
- Species: P. tesselatus

Binomial name
- Pteraster tesselatus Ives, 1888

Synonyms
- P. gracilis H.L. Clark, 1901; P. hebes Verrill, 1909; P. japonicus Uchida, 1931; P. multispinus H.L. Clark, 1901; P. reticulatus Verrill, 1909

= Pteraster tesselatus =

Species of starfish

Pteraster tesselatus, the slime star or cushion star, is a species of starfish in the family Pterasteridae found in the North Pacific.

== Description ==
The slime star's body has a wide central disc and five stumpy arms with upturned tips. It grows to a diameter of about 15 cm (5.9 in) and has an inflated appearance as the entire aboral (upper) surface is covered by a thick, raised, fleshy membrane. This has a smooth soft texture and is pale brown, grey, red, or orange, often with a symmetrical darker pattern. It conceals the madreporite and scales on the aboral surface proper and the gap underneath it is filled with a spongy tissue. A central pore in this membrane allows for water movement. The arms have rows of fan-shaped groups of five to seven spines between which are two rows of tube feet. The red eyespot is surrounded by spines at the apex of each arm.

== Distribution and habitat ==
The slime star occurs in rocky areas on the west coast of North America from the Bering Sea southwards to central California at depths to 950 m (3,120 ft). It is also known from the Aleutian Islands and Japan. It is usually found in places where the current is strong.

== Biology ==
The slime star feeds on various benthic invertebrates, including the breadcrumb sponge (Halichondria panicea), the false jingle shell (Pododesmus macroschisma), other scallops and clams, and colonial sea squirts such as Aplidium and Didemnum species. It also feeds on the bacterial film that grows on the surface of mussels. If attacked by a predator such as the morning sun star (Solaster dawsoni) or the sunflower star (Pycnopodia helianthoides), the slime star emits great quantities of repellent mucus and can often evade the predator. The mucus is toxic and has been shown to kill other invertebrates immersed in it.

The slime star breeds in the summer, with a female releasing a small number of eggs into the water. Nearby males then release sperm and the fertilised eggs rise to the surface of the water. They are bright orange or yellow and are wrapped in a gelatinous membrane. They become planktonic and pass through several developmental stages over the course of about 25 days. They then undergo metamorphosis into juvenile starfish and settle onto the seabed.

One of several different species of polychaete worms often lives symbiotically within the ambulacral grooves on the oral (under) surface of the slime star.
