= Iophon husvikense =

Scientific classification
- Kingdom: Animalia
- Phylum: Porifera
- Class: Demospongiae
- Order: Poecilosclerida
- Family: Acarnidae
- Genus: Iophon
- Species: I. husvikense

Binomial name
- Iophon husvikense Goodwin, Brewin & Brickle, 2012

Species of sponge

Iophon husvikense is a species of sea sponge first found on the coast of South Georgia island, in the south west Southern Ocean.
