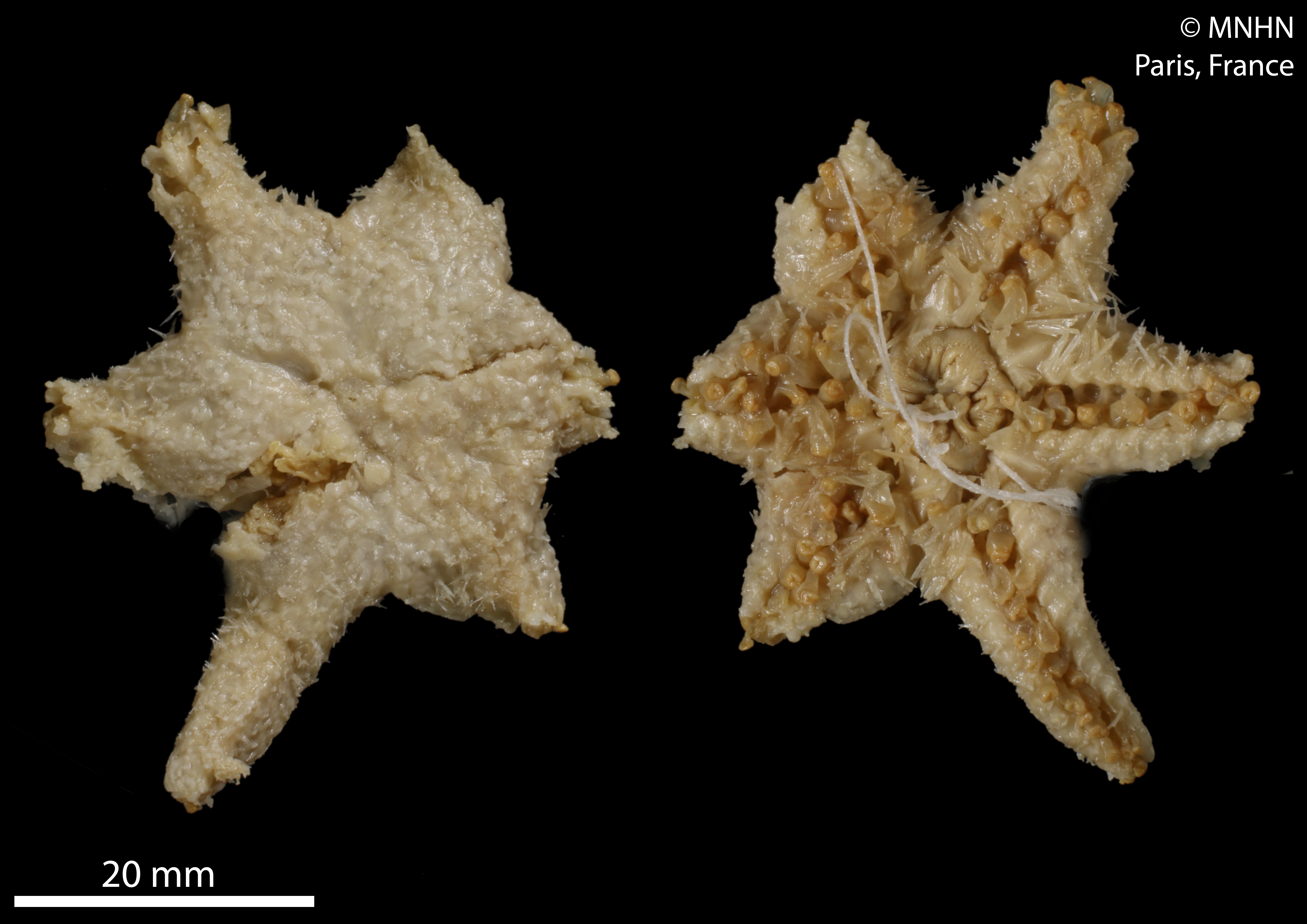
- Specimen of Myxaster perrieri in the Muséum national d'histoire naturelle (Paris, France)

Scientific classification
- Kingdom: Animalia
- Phylum: Echinodermata
- Class: Asteroidea
- Order: Velatida
- Family: Myxasteridae
- Genus: Myxaster
- Species: M. perrieri

Binomial name
- Myxaster perrieri Koehler, 1895

= Myxaster perrieri =

Species of Starfish

Myxaster perrieri is a species of starfish belonging to the family Myxasteridae.
