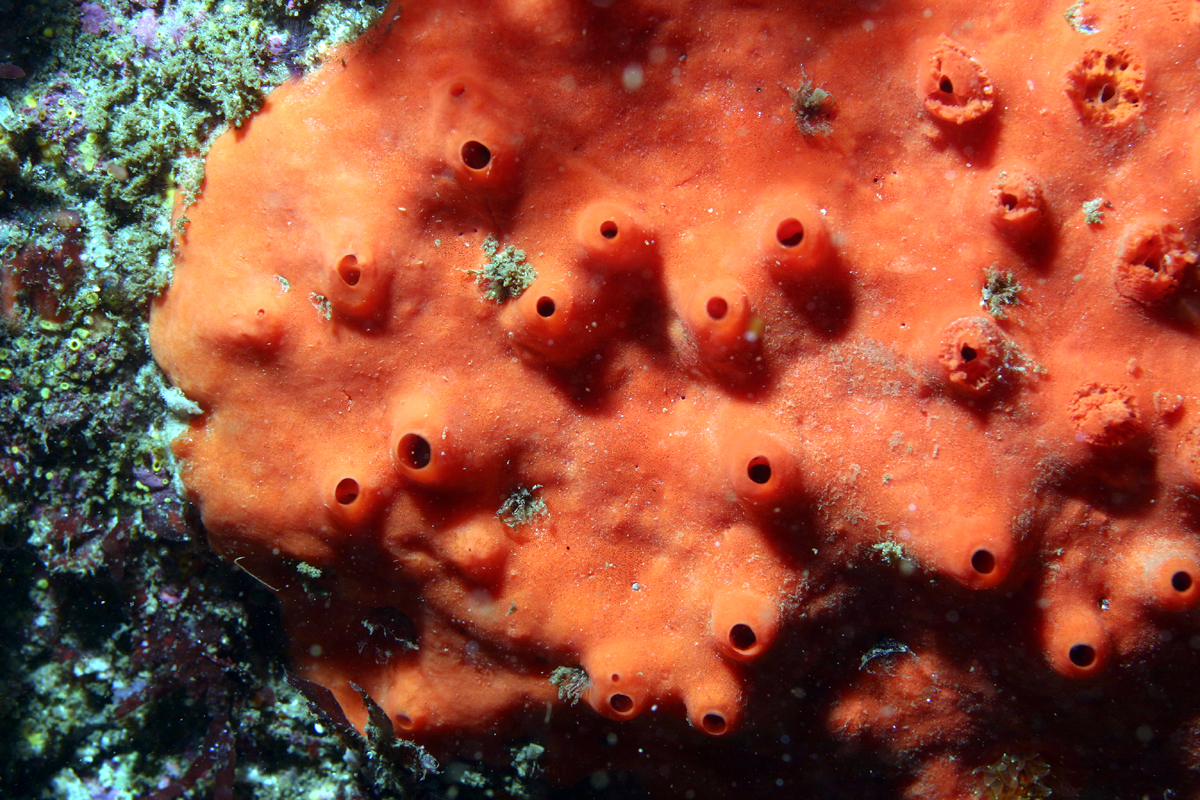

Scientific classification
- Kingdom: Animalia
- Phylum: Porifera
- Class: Demospongiae
- Order: Poecilosclerida
- Family: Acarnidae
- Genus: Acarnus
- Species: A. erithacus

Binomial name
- Acarnus erithacus de Laubenfels, 1927

= Acarnus erithacus =

Species of sponge

Acarnus erithacus is a species of sponge of the genus Acarnus. It was described by de Laubenfels in 1927.
