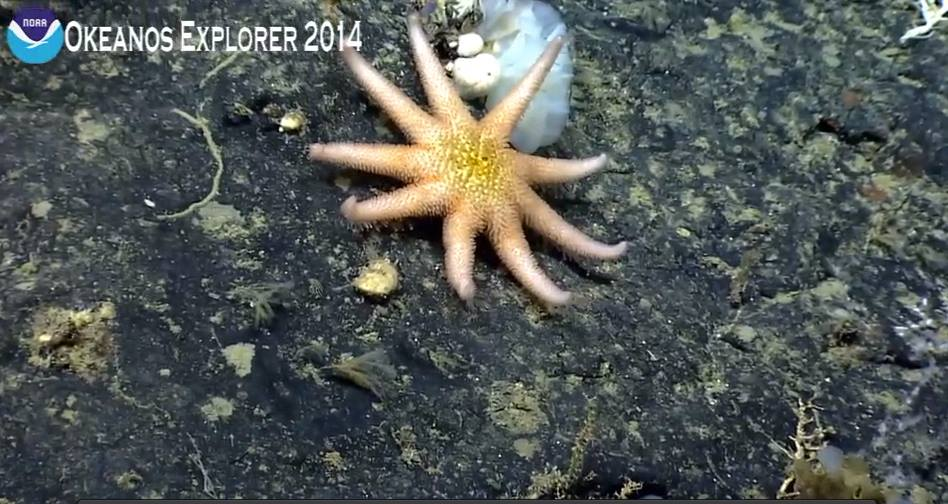
- Myxaster sp.

Scientific classification
- Kingdom: Animalia
- Phylum: Echinodermata
- Class: Asteroidea
- Order: Velatida
- Family: Myxasteridae
- Genus: Myxaster; Perrier, 1885

= Myxaster =

Genus of starfishes

Myxaster is a genus of deep-sea velatid sea stars containing three species.

== Taxonomy ==
List of species according to World Register of Marine Species:

- Myxaster medusa (Fisher, 1913)
- Myxaster perrieri Koehler, 1896
- Myxaster sol Perrier, 1885
