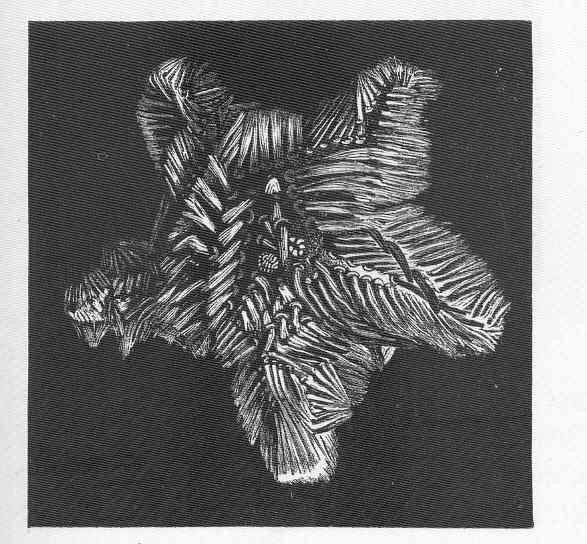
- Korethraster hispidus

Scientific classification
- Kingdom: Animalia
- Phylum: Echinodermata
- Class: Asteroidea
- Order: Velatida
- Family: Korethrasteridae; Danielssen & Koren, 1884

Genera
- Korethraster; Peribolaster; Remaster

= Korethrasteridae =

Family of starfishes

Korethrasteridae is a family of starfish in the order Velatida. It contains the following genera and species:

- Genus Korethraster
  - Korethraster hispidus
- Genus Peribolaster
  - Peribolaster biserialis
  - Peribolaster folliculatus
  - Peribolaster lictor
  - Peribolaster macleani
- Genus Remaster
  - Remaster gourdoni
  - Remaster palmatus
