= Tropidaster =

Tropidaster Temporal range: Early Jurassic

Scientific classification
- Kingdom: Animalia
- Phylum: Echinodermata
- Class: Asteroidea
- Order: Velatida
- Family: †Tropidasteridae; Wright, 1880
- Genus: †Tropidaster; Forbes, 1850

Extinct genus of starfishes

Tropidaster is an extinct genus of sea stars that lived in the Early Jurassic. It is the only genus in the family Tropidasteridae. Its fossils have been found in Europe.
