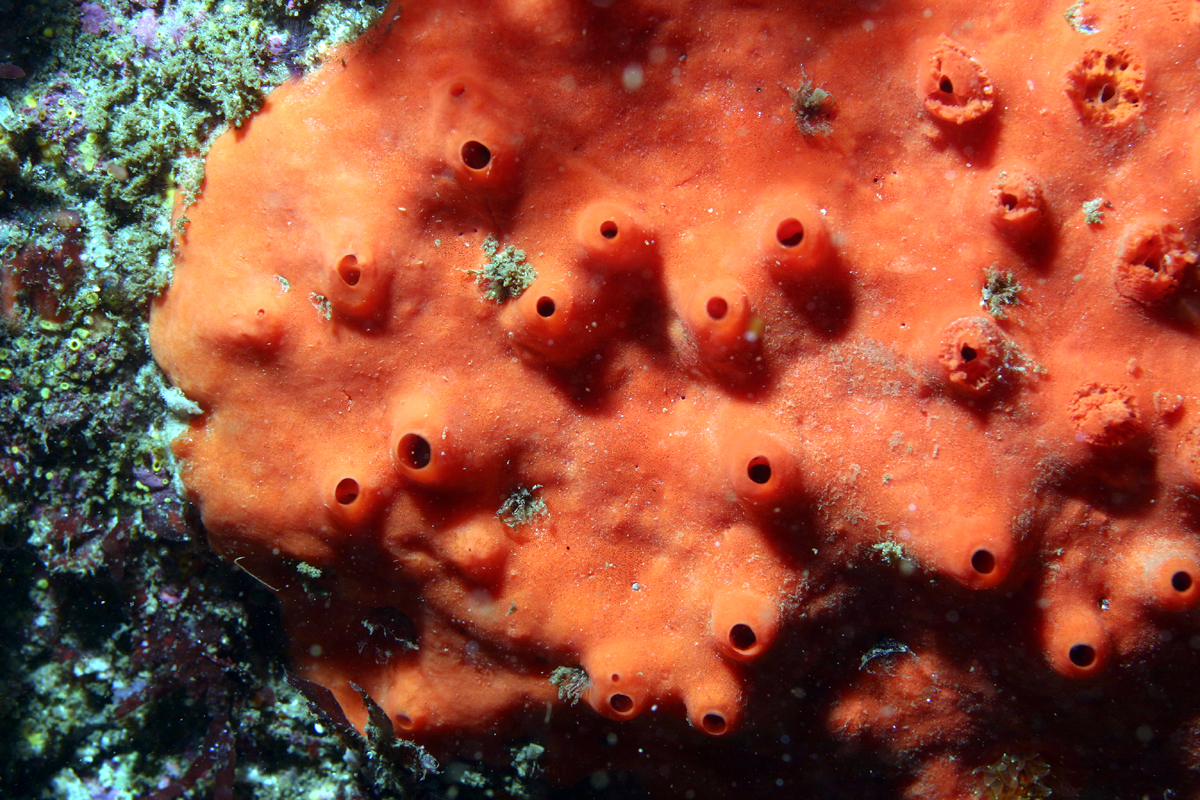
- Acarnus erithacus

Scientific classification
- Kingdom: Animalia
- Phylum: Porifera
- Class: Demospongiae
- Order: Poecilosclerida
- Family: Acarnidae
- Genus: Acarnus (Gray, 1867)

Species
- See text.

Synonyms
- Acanthacarnus (Lévi, 1952); Acarnus (Acanthacarnus) (Lévi, 1952); Acarnus (Acarnus) (Gray, 1867); Fonteia (Gray, 1867); Microtylotella (Dendy, 1896); Trefortia (Deszö, 1880)

= Acarnus =

Genus of sponges

Acarnus is a genus of sponges belonging to the family Acarnidae. The genus has almost cosmopolitan distribution (except Europe).

== Description ==
Species are non-fistulose sponges with encrusting to massive growth forms. They have ectosomal tylotes (long, slender megascleres with knobs at both ends) with microspined ends. These form tangential or paratangential tracts. The choanosomal skeleton is isodictyal (triangular mesh in which each side is one spicule long), isotropic (no differentiation into primary or secondary tracts, lines or fibers), or anisotropic (primary and secondary tracts, lines or fibers). In encrusting species, it may occasionally be plumose (skeletal structures radiate from primary fibres or spicule tracts) or hymedesmioid (monoaxon megascleres arranged singly with the heads fixed to a spongin base and the points directed outwards). The skeletal tracts are covered with smooth styles, which may be spined by cladotylotes. Cladotylotes are unique to this genus. They are monoaxon megascleres with at least one hooked end. The other end may also have hooks, or it may be a pronounced smooth knob. The microscleres are palmate isochelae and several forms of toxas.

== Species ==
The following species are recognised:

- Acarnus bergquistae (van Soest, Hooper & Hiemstra, 1991)
- Acarnus bicladotylotus (Hoshino, 1981)
- Acarnus caledoniensis (Hooper & Lévi, 1993)
- Acarnus claudei (van Soest, Hooper & Hiemstra, 1991)
- Acarnus deweerdtae (van Soest, Hooper & Hiemstra, 1991)
- Acarnus erithacus (de Laubenfels, 1927)
- Acarnus guentheri (Dendy, 1896)
- Acarnus hoshinoi (van Soest, Hooper & Hiemstra, 1991)
- Acarnus innominatus (Gray, 1867)
- Acarnus levii (Vacelet, 1960)
- Acarnus michoacanensis (Aguilar-Camacho, Carballo & Cruz-Barraza, 2013)
- Acarnus nicoleae (van Soest, Hooper & Hiemstra, 1991)
- Acarnus oaxaquensis (Aguilar-Camacho, Carballo & Cruz-Barraza, 2013)
- Acarnus peruanus (van Soest, Hooper & Hiemstra, 1991)
- Acarnus primigenius (Hiemstra & Hooper, 1991)
- Acarnus radovani (Boury-Esnault, 1973)
- Acarnus sabulum (Aguilar-Camacho, Carballo & Cruz-Barraza, 2013)
- Acarnus souriei (Lévi, 1952)
- Acarnus tener (Tanita, 1963)
- Acarnus tenuis (Dendy, 1896)
- Acarnus ternatus (Ridley, 1884)
- Acarnus thielei (Lévi, 1958)
- Acarnus topsenti (Dendy, 1922)
- Acarnus tortilis (Topsent, 1892)
- Acarnus toxeata (Boury-Esnault, 1973)
- Acarnus wolffgangi (Keller, 1889)
