= Xyloplax turnerae =

Scientific classification
- Kingdom: Animalia
- Phylum: Echinodermata
- Class: Asteroidea
- Order: Peripodida
- Family: Xyloplacidae
- Genus: Xyloplax
- Species: X. turnerae

Binomial name
- Xyloplax turnerae Rowe, Baker & Clark, 1988

Species of starfish

Xyloplax turnerae is a sea daisy, a member of an unusual group of marine taxa belonging to the phylum Echinodermata. It has been found living on decaying timber in a deep oceanic trench in the Bahamas.

== Discovery ==
An enigmatic new species of echinoderm, Xyloplax medusiformis, was discovered in the South Pacific near New Zealand and first described in 1986 by Baker, Rowe and Clark. Further deep sea exploration by the same team using a submersible vehicle led to the discovery of a new species of Xyloplax. Pieces of timber were deposited at a depth of 2,066 metres (6,778 ft) in an oceanic trench known as the Tongue of the Ocean between the Bahamian islands of Andros and New Providence. When recovered nearly two years later they yielded more than two hundred specimens of Xyloplax turnerae. In 2004, another species in this genus was collected in a similar way from a depth of 2,675 metres (8,776 ft) in the north east Pacific Ocean. It has since been named Xyloplax janetae.

== Description ==
Xyloplax turnerae is very much like Xyloplax medusiformis in appearance. It is shaped like a flattened disc and is fringed by a row of short spines which are all of approximately equal length in the range 300–400 μm. The aboral (upper) surface is clad in a series of concentric plates each bearing three spines. The tube feet have rounded bulbous tips. On the oral (lower) side the mouth leads to an eversible stomach but there is no gut or anus. There is a single row of tube feet circling the mouth and these number up to 110 while X. medusiformis has fewer than 65. The females grow to about 12 millimetres (0.47 in) in diameter and the males to 7 millimetres (0.28 in). All the embryos found in the females were small, less than 180 μm in diameter, and it seems unlikely that this species broods its young in the same way that X. medusiformis does. The marginal spines are mobile and are disproportionally longer in smaller individuals than they are in larger ones. It is thought that juveniles may use them to "parachute" and that this may aid in their dispersal.
