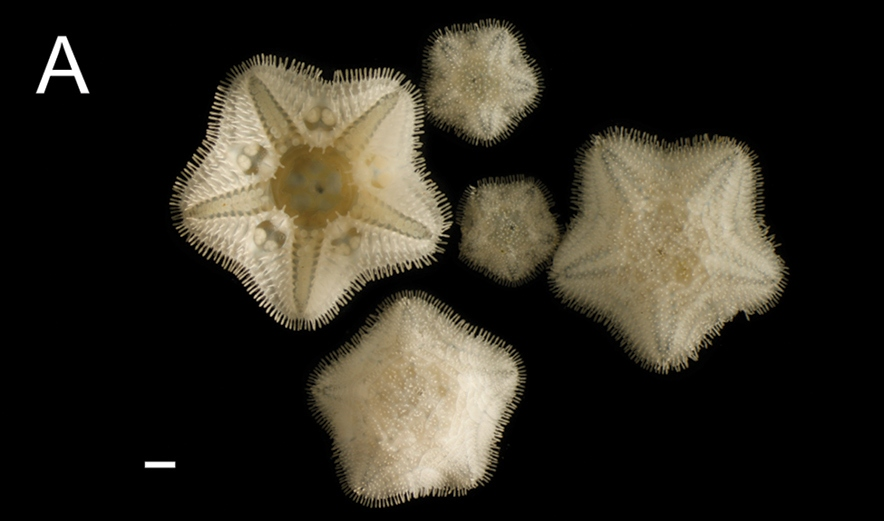
- Caymanostella sp. (E7035, dorsal view). Scale bar: 1 mm. SIO_BIC_E11440 (E11440) and SIO_BIC_E11441 (E7075). Pacific margin of Costa Rica.

Scientific classification
- Kingdom: Animalia
- Phylum: Echinodermata
- Class: Asteroidea
- Order: Velatida
- Family: Caymanostellidae; Belyaev, 1974

Genera
- 2, see text

= Caymanostellidae =

Family of starfishes

Caymanostellidae is a family of sea stars containing six species in two families. These asteroids normally have thick bodies with large discs.

== Taxonomy ==
List of families according to World Register of Marine Species:

- Belyaevostella Rowe, 1989
  - Belyaevostella hispida (Aziz & Jangoux, 1984)
  - Belyaevostella hyugaensis Fujita, Stampanato & Jangoux, 1994
- Caymanostella Belyaev, 1974
  - Caymanostella admiranda Belyaev & Litvinova, 1977
  - Caymanostella madagascariensis Belyaev & Litvinova, 1991
  - Caymanostella phorcynis Rowe, 1989
  - Caymanostella spinimarginata Belyaev, 1974
  - Caymanostella loresae Shen et al, 2024
