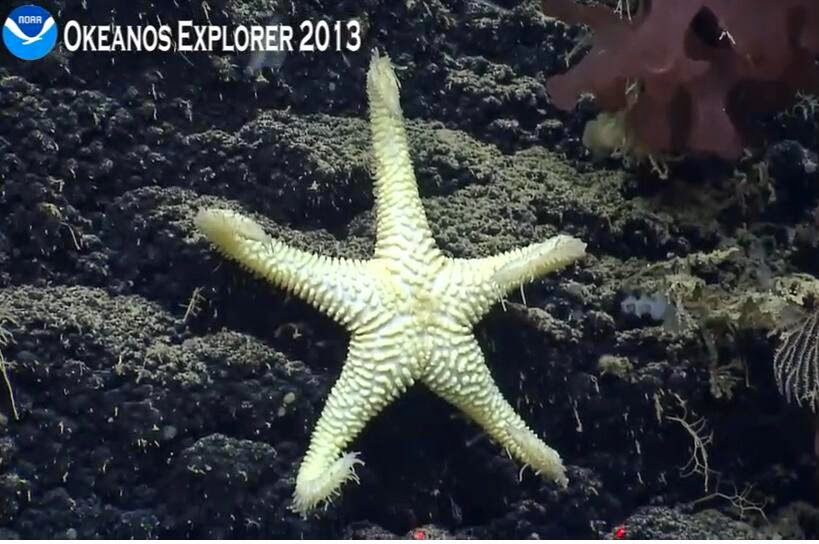
- Pythonaster sp. (probably P. atlantidis)

Scientific classification
- Kingdom: Animalia
- Phylum: Echinodermata
- Class: Asteroidea
- Order: Velatida
- Family: Myxasteridae; Perrier, 1885

Genera
- 3, see text

= Myxasteridae =

Family of starfishes

Myxasteridae is a family of deep-sea velatid sea stars containing nine species in three genera.

== Taxonomy ==
List of families according to World Register of Marine Species:

- genus Asthenactis Fisher, 1906
  - Asthenactis australis McKnight, 2006
  - Asthenactis fisheri Alton, 1966
  - Asthenactis papyraceus Fisher, 1906
- genus Heligmaster Mah, 2022
  - Heligmaster kanaloa Mah, 2022
  - Heligmaster pele Mah, 2022
- genus Myxaster Perrier, 1885
  - Myxaster medusa (Fisher, 1913)
  - Myxaster perrieri Koehler, 1896
  - Myxaster sol Perrier, 1885
- genus Pythonaster Sladen in Thomson & Murray, 1885
  - Pythonaster atlantidis A.H. Clark, 1948
  - Pythonaster murrayi Sladen, 1889
  - Pythonaster pacificus Downey, 1979
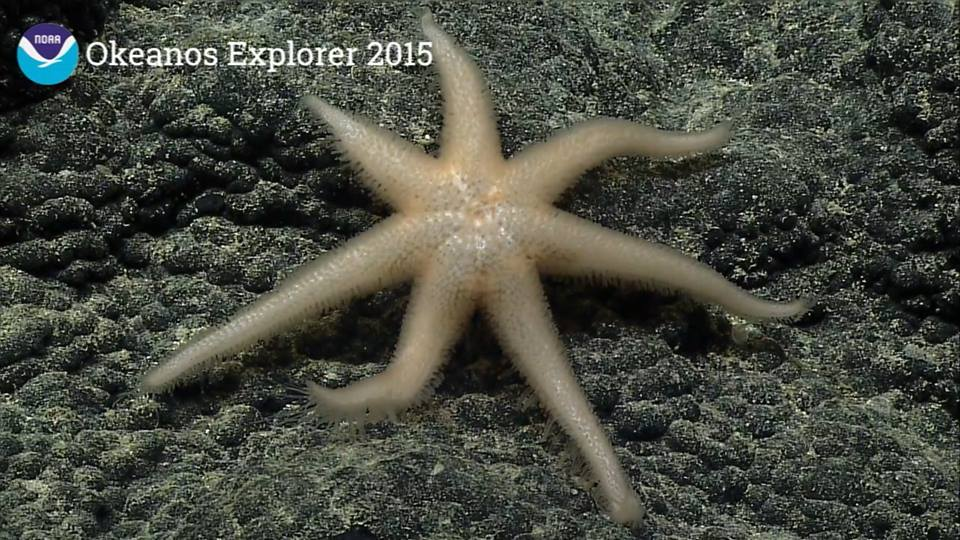
Asthenactis papyraceus

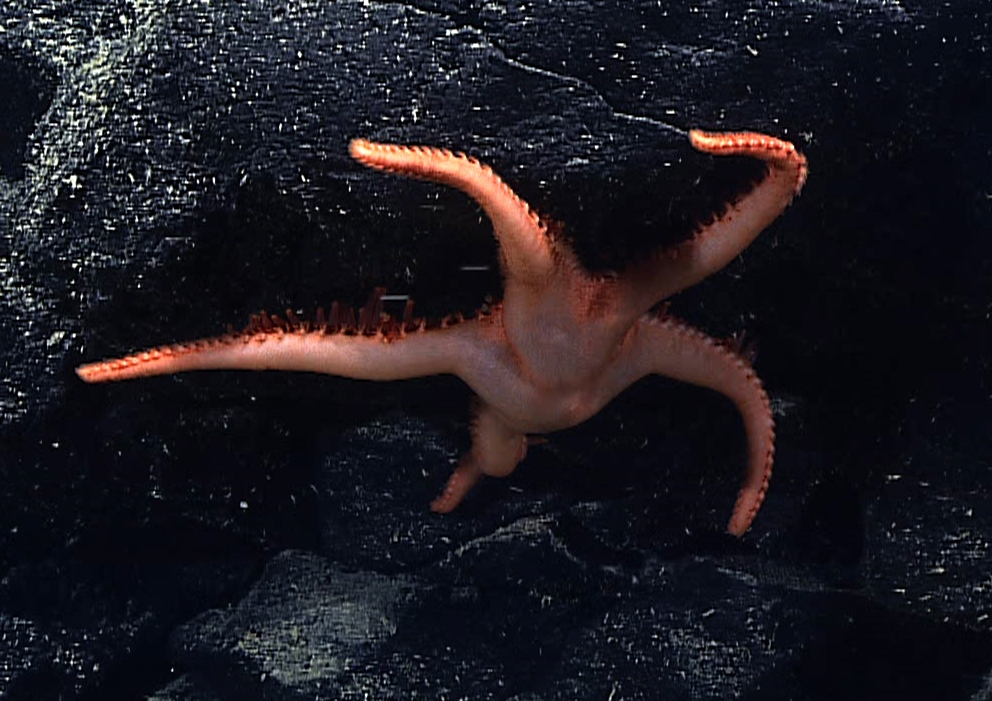
Heligmaster kanaloa

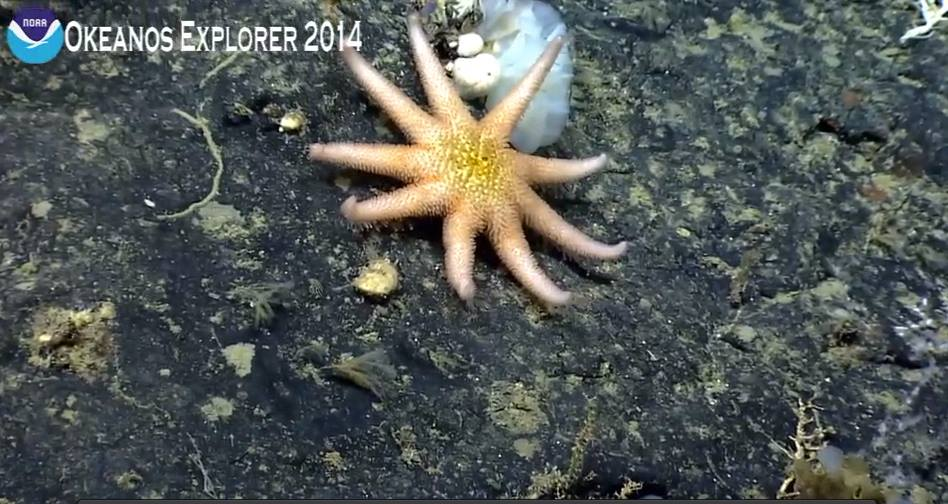
Myxaster sp.

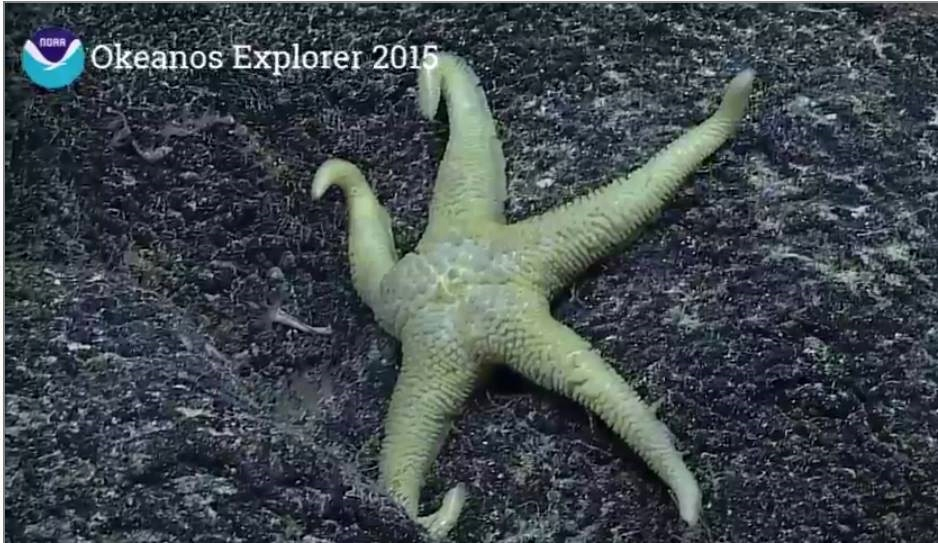
Pythonaster sp.
