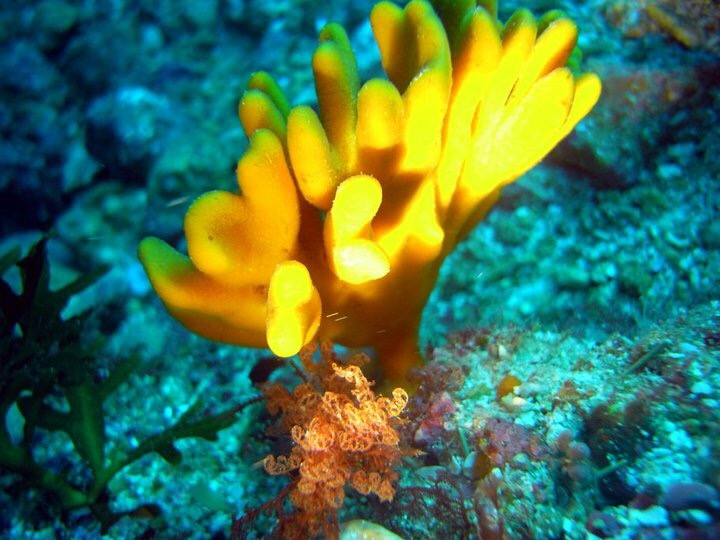
- Iophon minor

Scientific classification
- Kingdom: Animalia
- Phylum: Porifera
- Class: Demospongiae
- Order: Poecilosclerida
- Family: Acarnidae
- Genus: Iophon (Gray, 1867)

Species
- See text.

Synonyms
- Alebion (Gray, 1867); Burtonella (de Laubenfels, 1928); Dendoryx (Iophon) (Gray, 1867); Hymedesanisochela (Bakus, 1966); Ingallia (Gray, 1867); Iophonopsis (Dendy, 1924); Iophonota (Laubenfels, 1936); Menyllus (Gray, 1867); Myxilla (Pocillon) (Topsent, 1891); Pocillon (Topsent, 1891)

= Iophon (sponge) =

Genus of sponges

Iophon is a genus of sponges belonging to the family Acarnidae. The genus has a cosmopolitan distribution.

== Description ==
This genus contains species with non-fistulose, massive, branching or encrusting growth forms. The ectosomal (outer) skeleton is made of tylotes (long, slender megascleres with knobs at both ends) with microspined bases. The choanosomal (inner) skeleton is a rounded, triangular or square-meshed network of smooth or spined choanosomal styles, arranged singly or with 2-3 per row. The microscleres include bipocilla and palmate anisochelae with spurs. Bipocilla are unique to this genus. They are modified anisochela in which the wing-like alae are joined together by a short curved shaft. Toxas are absent.

== Species ==
The following species are recognised:

- Iophon abnormalis (Ridley & Dendy, 1886)
- Iophon aceratum (Hentschel, 1914)
- Iophon bipocillum (Aguilar-Camacho, Carballo & Cruz-Barraza, 2013)
- Iophon cheliferum (Ridley & Dendy, 1886)
- Iophon chilense (Desqueyroux-Faúndez & van Soest, 1996)
- Iophon cylindricum (Ridley & Dendy, 1886)
- Iophon dogieli (Koltun, 1955)
- Iophon dubium (Hansen, 1885)
- Iophon flabellodigitatum (Kirkpatrick, 1907)
- Iophon frigidum (Lundbeck, 1905)
- Iophon funis (Topsent, 1892)
- Iophon gaussi (Hentschel, 1914)
- Iophon hesperidesi (Rios, Cristobo & Urgorri, 2004)
- Iophon husvikense (Goodwin, Brewin & Brickle, 2012)
- Iophon hyndmani (Bowerbank, 1858)
- Iophon indentatus (Wilson, 1904)
- Iophon koltuni (Morozov, Sabirov & Zimina, 2019)
- Iophon laevistylus (Dendy, 1924)
- Iophon lamella (Wilson, 1904)
- Iophon laminale (Ridley & Dendy, 1886)
- Iophon methanophila (Cárdenas, 2019)
- Iophon minor (Brøndsted, 1924)
- Iophon nigricans (Bowerbank, 1858)
- Iophon omnivorus (Ridley & Dendy, 1887)
- Iophon ostiamagna (Wilson, 1904)
- Iophon parvachela (Esteves, de Paula, Lerner, Lôbo-Hajdu & Hajdu, 2018)
- Iophon piceum (Vosmaer, 1882)
- Iophon pictoni (Goodwin, Brewin & Brickle, 2011)
- Iophon pluricorne (Topsent, 1907)
- Iophon pommeraniae (Thiele, 1903)
- Iophon proximum (Ridley,1881)
- Iophon radiatum (Topsent, 1901)
- Iophon rayae (Bakus, 1966)
- Iophon roseum (Goodwin, Brewin & Brickle, 2016)
- Iophon semispinosum (Bergquist, 1961)
- Iophon spinulentum (Bowerbank, 1866)
- Iophon terranovae (Calcinai & Pansini, 2000)
- Iophon timidum (Desqueyroux-Faúndez & van Soest, 1996)
- Iophon tubiforme (Desqueyroux-Faúndez & van Soest, 1996)
- Iophon unicorne (Topsent, 1907)
- Iophon variopocillatum (Alander, 1942)
