= Iophon cheliferum =

Scientific classification
- Kingdom: Animalia
- Phylum: Porifera
- Class: Demospongiae
- Order: Poecilosclerida
- Family: Acarnidae
- Genus: Iophon
- Species: I. cheliferum

Binomial name
- Iophon cheliferum Ridley & Dendy, 1886

Synonyms
- Iophon chelifer Ridley & Dendy, 1886

Species of sponge

Iophon cheliferum, also known as the white reticulated sponge, is a species of sea sponge which lives on the bottom of the ocean. It is a deep water species found in the south eastern Pacific Ocean and South Africa.

== Distribution ==
Iophon cheliferum is found in deep water on the continental shelf of South Africa and Namibia, the Agulhas Bank off the southern tip of Africa, the Crozet Islands and Prince Edward Islands. It was first described by Ridley and Dendy from the over 4000 new species collected during the Challenger expedition of 1873-1976 which was the first expedition to study deep water organisms and the ocean depths. A variety, Iophon cheliferum var. californiana de Laubenfels, 1932 is found in the Galapagos Islands and north west Pacific but this has been synonymized with Iophon lamella.
