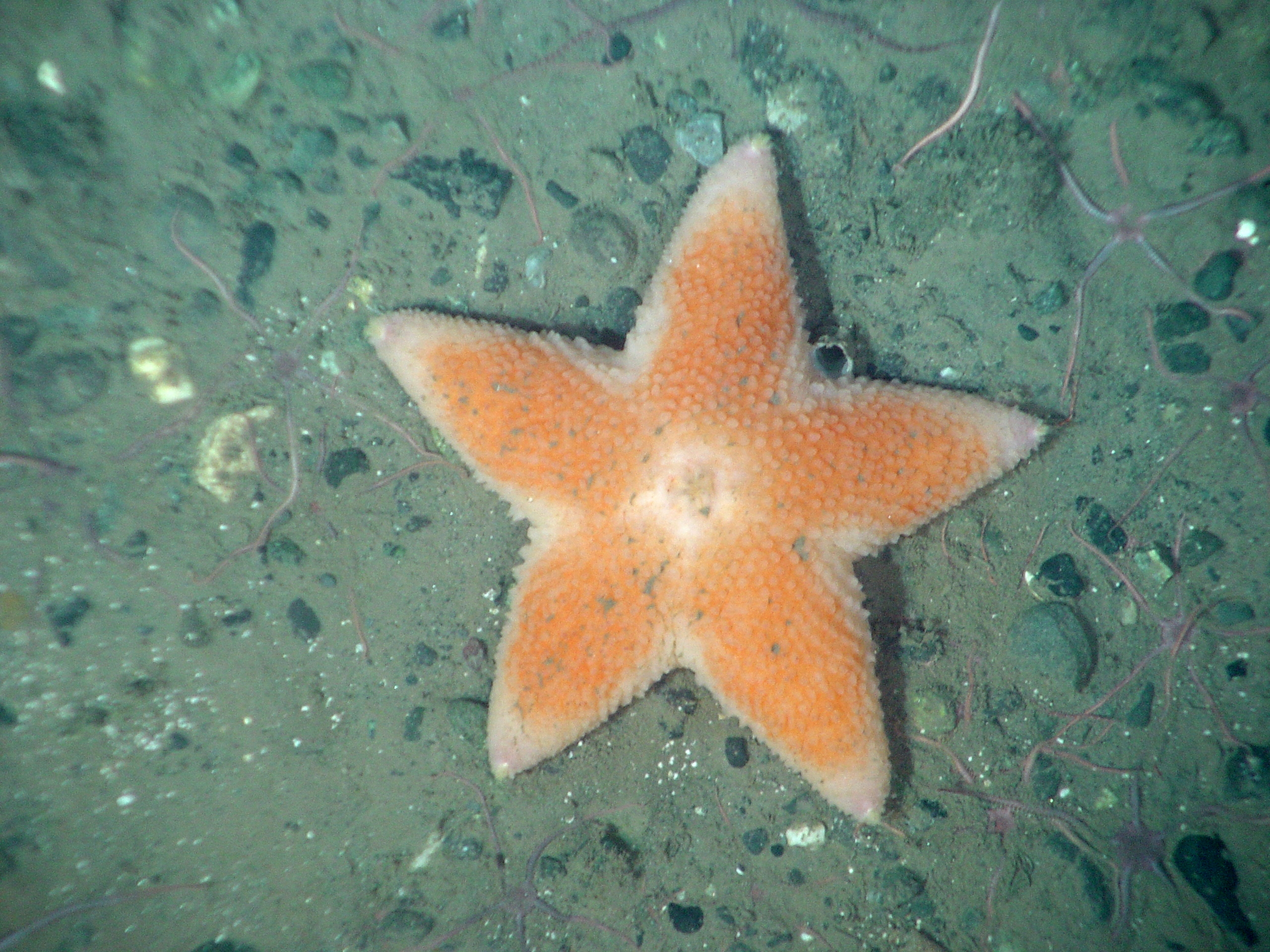
- Pteraster sp.

Scientific classification
- Kingdom: Animalia
- Phylum: Echinodermata
- Class: Asteroidea
- Order: Velatida
- Family: Pterasteridae
- Genus: Pteraster; Thomson, 1873

Species
- See text

= Pteraster =

Genus of starfishes

Pteraster is a genus of sea stars in the family Pterasteridae.

== Species ==
The following species are listed in the World Register of Marine Species:

- Pteraster abyssorum (Verrill, 1895)
- Pteraster acicula (Downey, 1970)
- Pteraster affinis Smith, 1876
- Pteraster alveolatus Perrier, 1894
- Pteraster bathami Fell, 1958
- Pteraster capensis Gray, 1847
- Pteraster caribbaeus Perrier, 1881
- Pteraster corynetes Fisher, 1916
- Pteraster coscinopeplus Fisher, 1910
- Pteraster diaphanus (Ludwig, 1905)
- Pteraster educator Djakonov, 1958
- Pteraster flabellifer Mortensen, 1933
- Pteraster florifer Koehler, 1920
- Pteraster fornicatus Mortensen, 1933
- Pteraster gibber (Sladen, 1882)
- Pteraster hastatus Mortensen, 1913
- Pteraster hirsutus (Sladen, 1882)
- Pteraster hymenasteroides Djakonov, 1958
- Pteraster hystrix Harvey, 1989
- Pteraster ifurus Golotsvan, 1998
- Pteraster inermis Perrier, 1888
- Pteraster jordani Fisher, 1905
- Pteraster koehleri A.M. Clark, 1962
- Pteraster marsippus Fisher, 1910
- Pteraster militarioides H.L. Clark, 1941
- Pteraster militaris (O.F. Müller, 1776)
- Pteraster minutus Djakonov, 1958
- Pteraster multiporus H.L. Clark, 1908
- Pteraster obesus H.L. Clark, 1908
- Pteraster obscurus (Perrier, 1891)
- Pteraster octaster Verrill, 1909
- Pteraster personatus Sladen, 1891
- Pteraster pulvillus (M. Sars, 1861)
- Pteraster reticulatus Fisher, 1906
- Pteraster robertsoni McKnight, 1973
- Pteraster rugatus Sladen, 1882
- Pteraster rugosus H.L. Clark, 1941
- Pteraster solitarius Djakonov, 1958
- Pteraster spinosissimus (Sladen, 1882)
- Pteraster stellifer Sladen, 1882
- Pteraster temnochiton Fisher, 1910
- Pteraster tesselatus Ives, 1888
- Pteraster tetracanthus H.L. Clark, 1916
- Pteraster texius Golotsvan, 1998
- Pteraster trigonodon Domantay, 1969
- Pteraster trigonodon Fisher, 1910
- Pteraster uragensis Hayashi, 1940
- Pteraster willsi Clark & Jewett, 2011
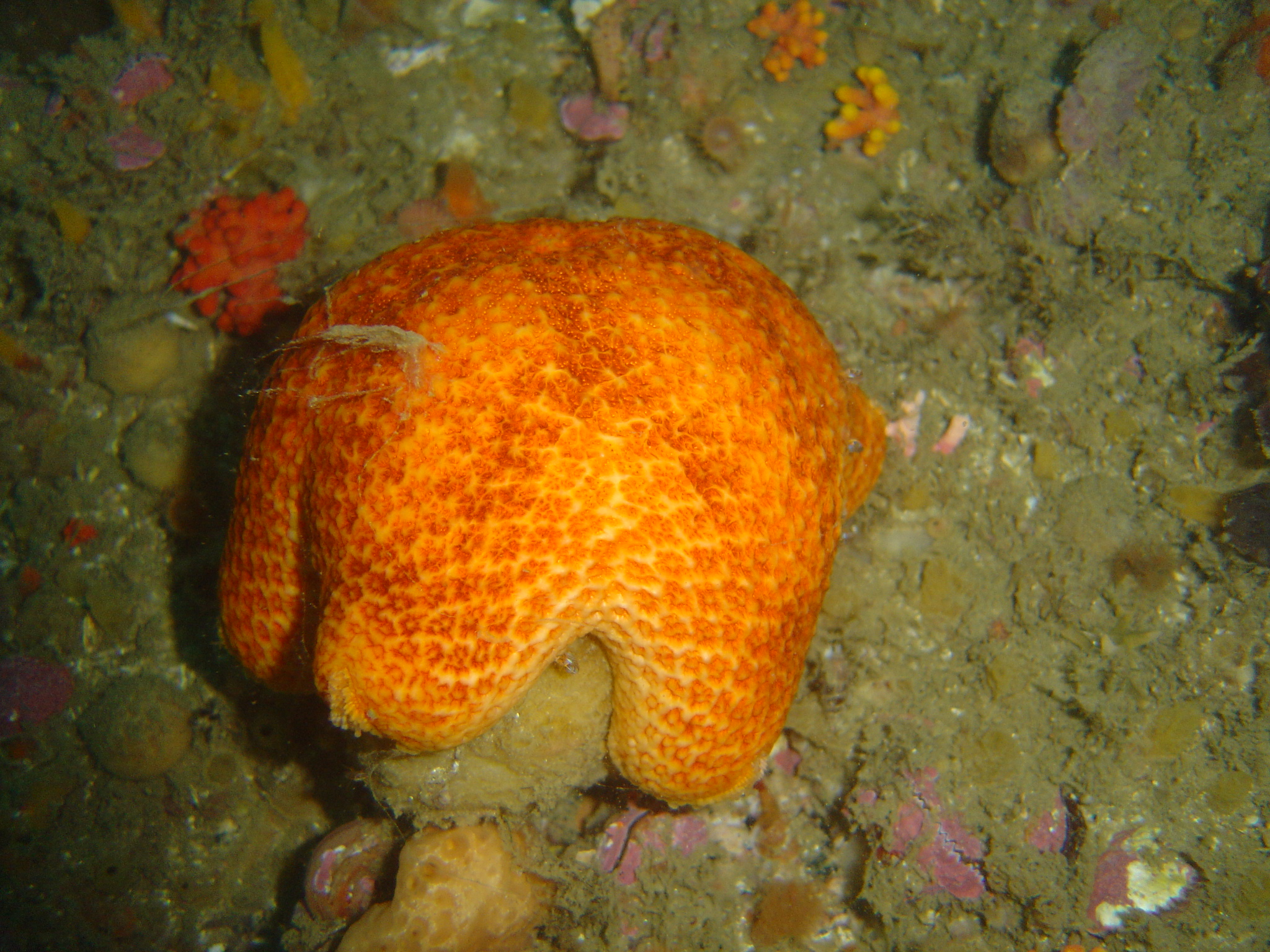
Pteraster capensis

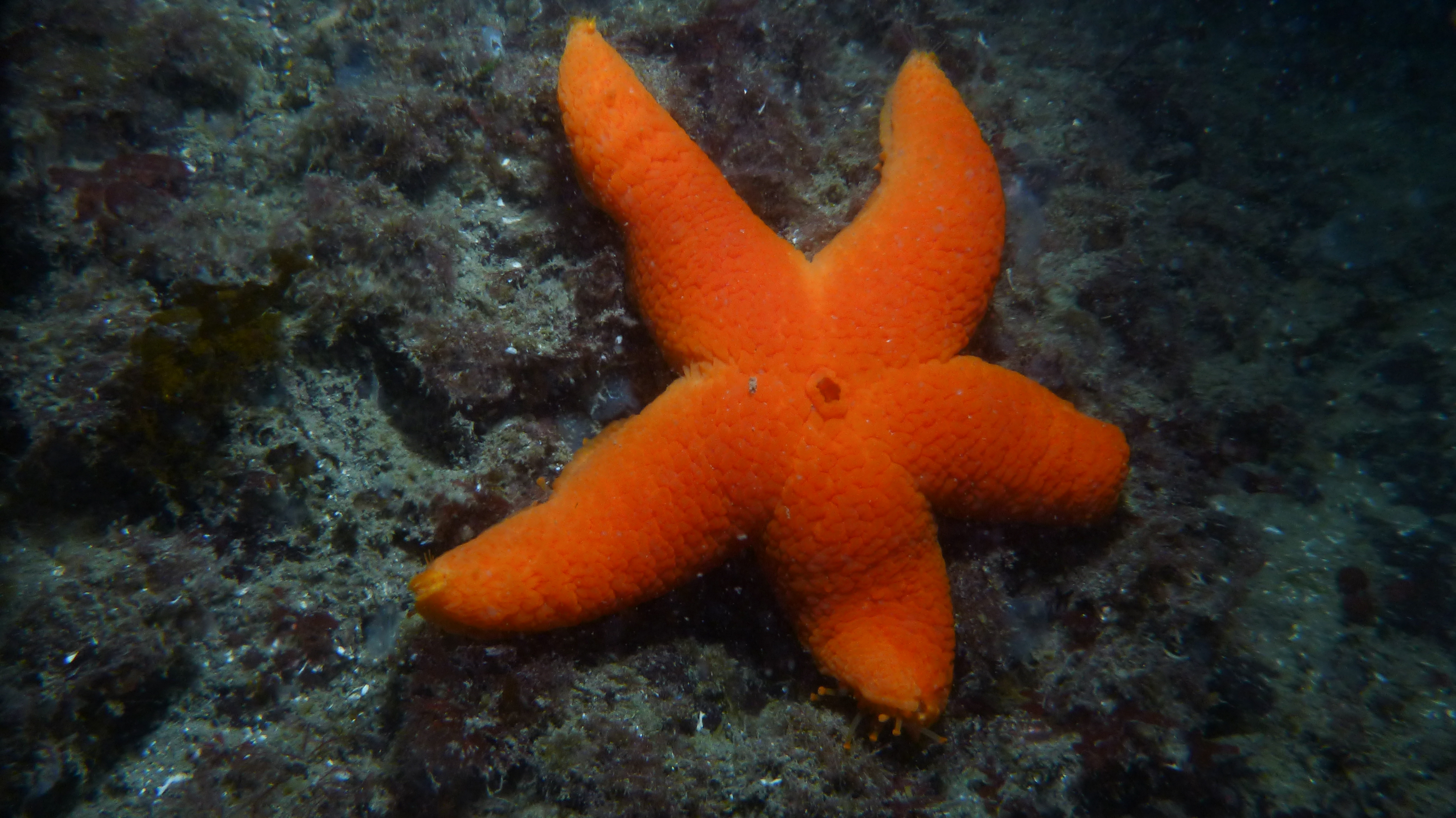
Pteraster militaris

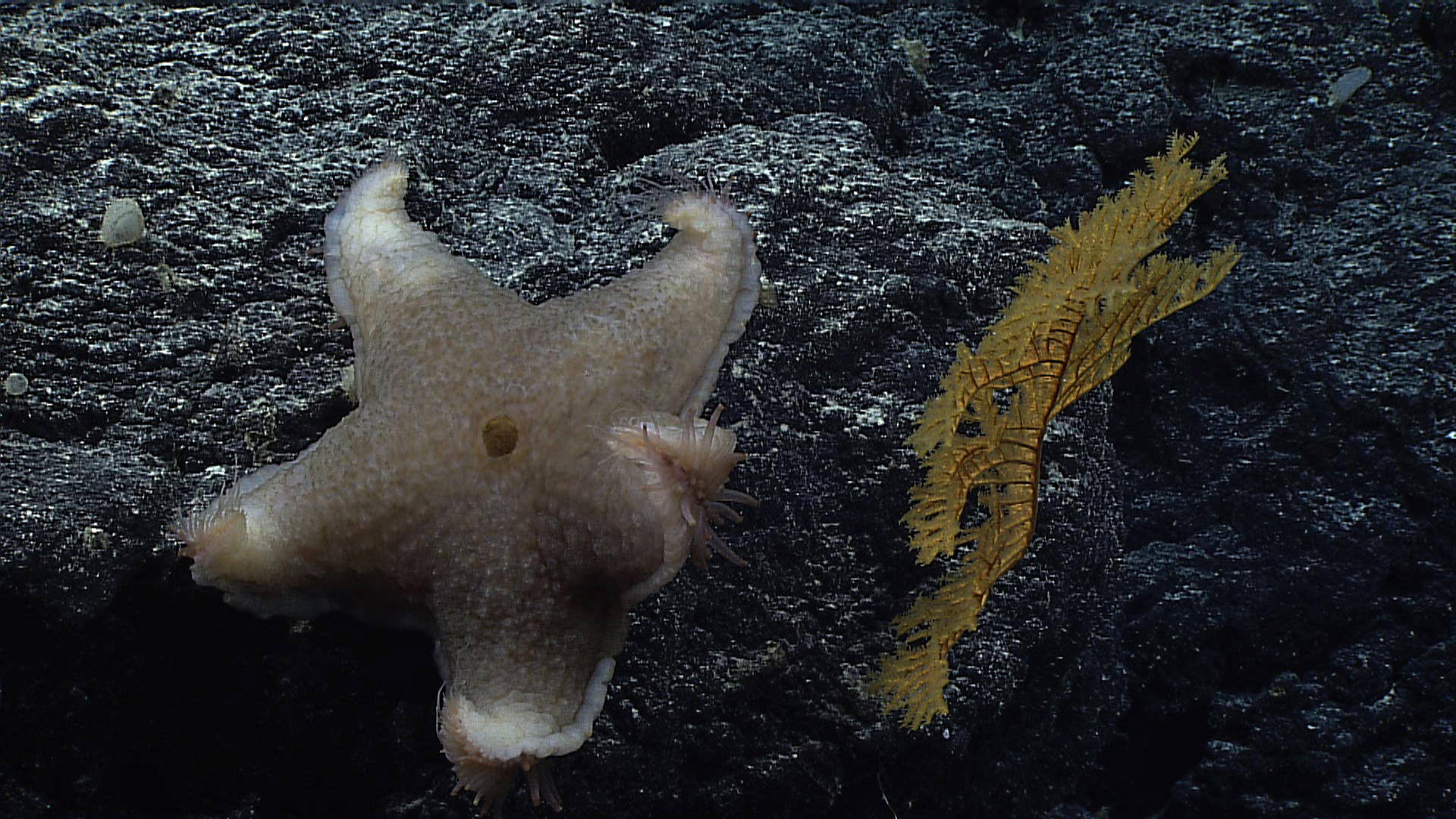
Pteraster reticulatus

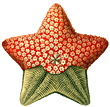
Pteraster stellifer (both faces)
