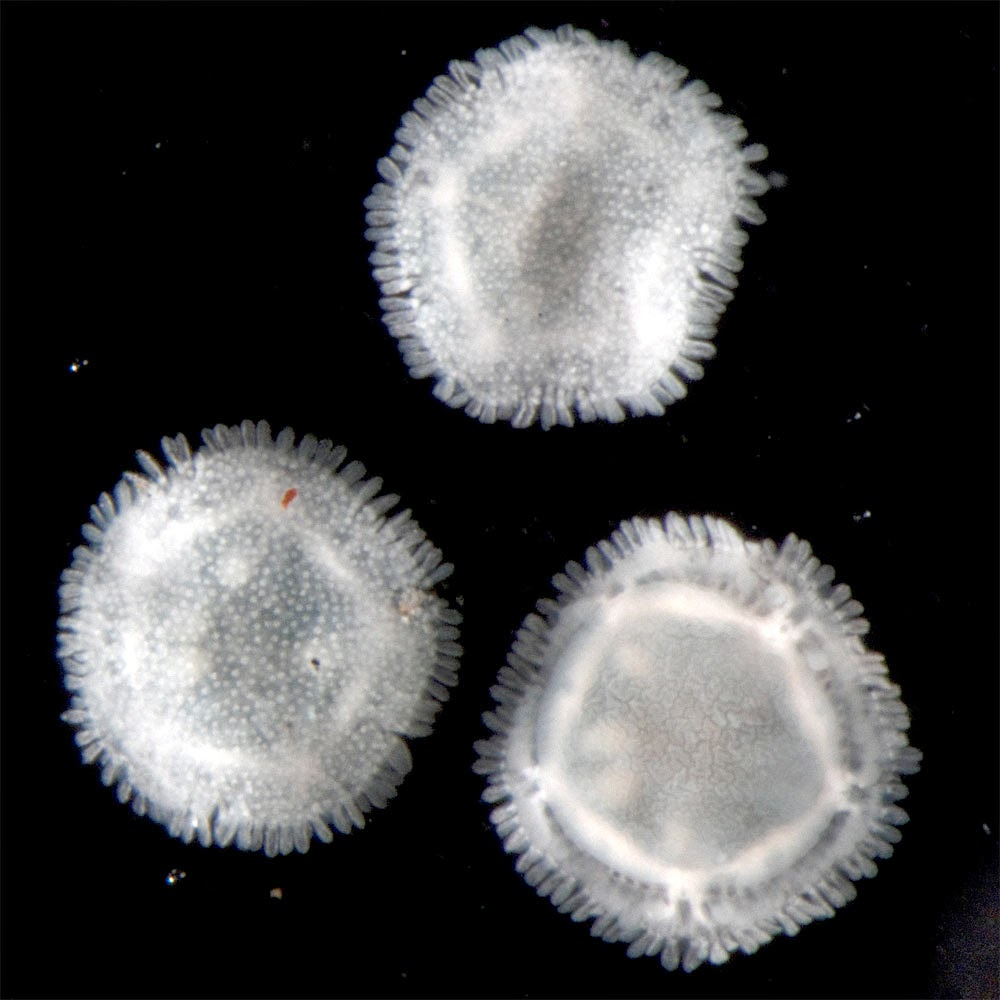
- Xyloplax janetae

Scientific classification
- Kingdom: Animalia
- Phylum: Echinodermata
- Class: Asteroidea
- Infraclass: Concentricycloidea; Baker, Rowe & Clark, 1986
- Order: Peripodida; Baker, Rowe & Clark, 1986
- Family: Xyloplacidae; Baker, Rowe & Clark, 1986
- Genus: Xyloplax; Baker, Rowe & Clark, 1986

Species
- Xyloplax janetae Xyloplax medusiformis Xyloplax turnerae

= Sea daisy =

Sea daisies

Genus of echinoderms

Sea daisies (infraclass Concentricycloidea; order Peripodida) make up an unusual group of deep‑sea taxa belonging to the phylum Echinodermata, with four species described in the genus Xyloplax. The intestine and anus are absent.

== Distribution ==
Sea daisies have been discovered in three localities: deep‑sea habitats off New Zealand, the Bahamas, and the northern central Pacific. They have been collected primarily from sunken, deep‑sea (1,000+ meters) wood. Although known from only a handful of specimens initially, many specimens have now been collected from the Bahamas. In 2026, their known habitat was expanded to depths of up to 5,634 meters after being found to inhabit whale-falls in the Diamantia Zone in the southeastern Indian Ocean.

== Classification ==
Since they were discovered in 1986, their position within the echinoderms has been debated. At first, they were placed in a new class, Concentricycloidea, since it was unclear whether they might have affinities with asteroids or ophiuroids. The former view gained acceptance and, since 2006, they have been considered a sister group to the Infraclass Neoasteroidea, which represents all post-Paleozoic asteroids within the Class Asteroidea.

Class Asteroidea, Infraclass Concentricycloidea, Order Peripodida (or Peripoda), Family Xyloplacidae

- Genus Xyloplax
  - Xyloplax janetae
  - Xyloplax medusiformis
  - Xyloplax princealberti
  - Xyloplax turnerae
