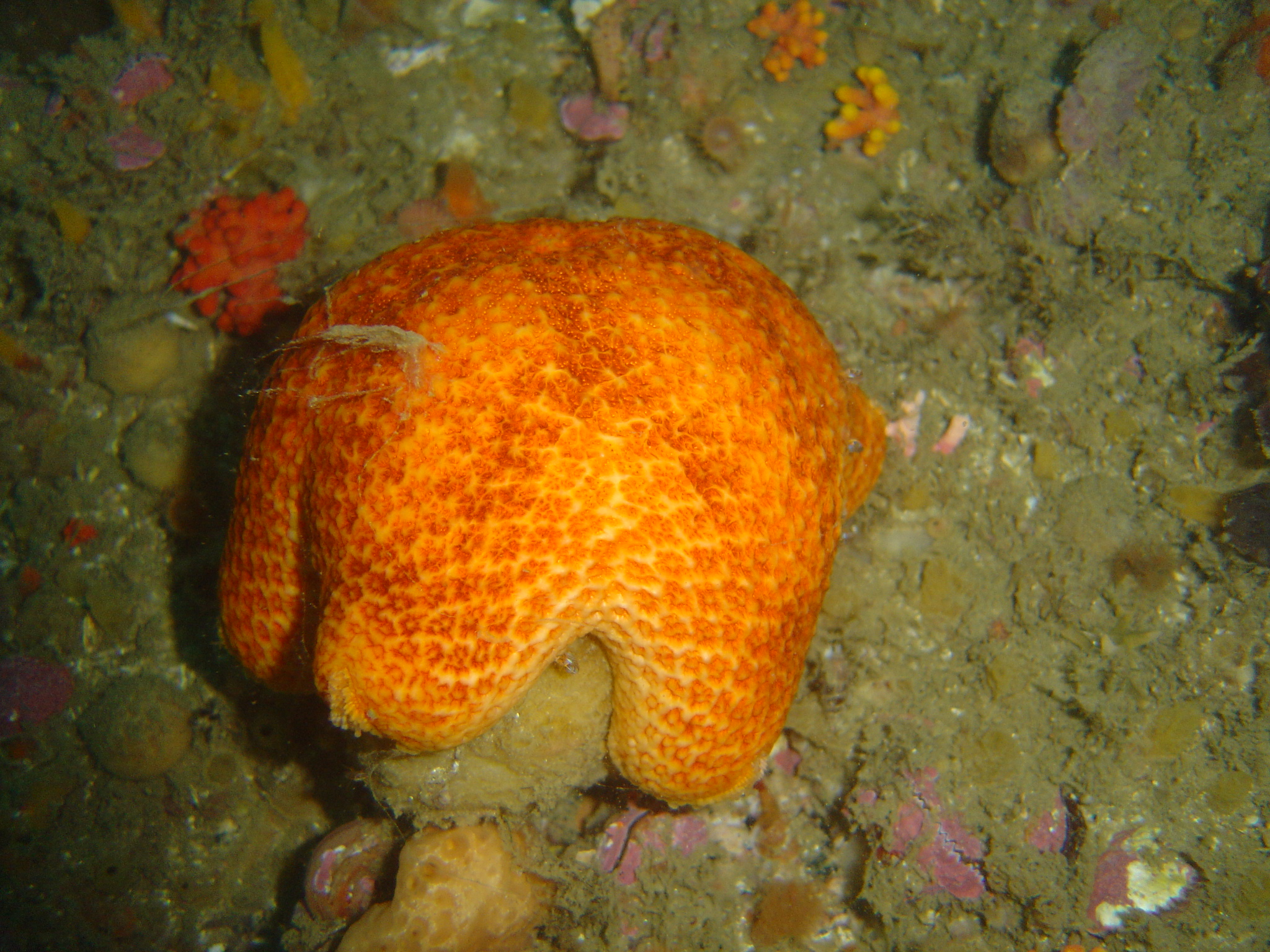

Scientific classification
- Kingdom: Animalia
- Phylum: Echinodermata
- Class: Asteroidea
- Order: Velatida
- Family: Pterasteridae
- Genus: Pteraster
- Species: P. capensis

Binomial name
- Pteraster capensis Gray, 1847

= Pteraster capensis =

Species of echinoderm

Pteraster capensis is a species of starfish belonging to the family Pterasteridae.

The species is found in Southern Africa.
