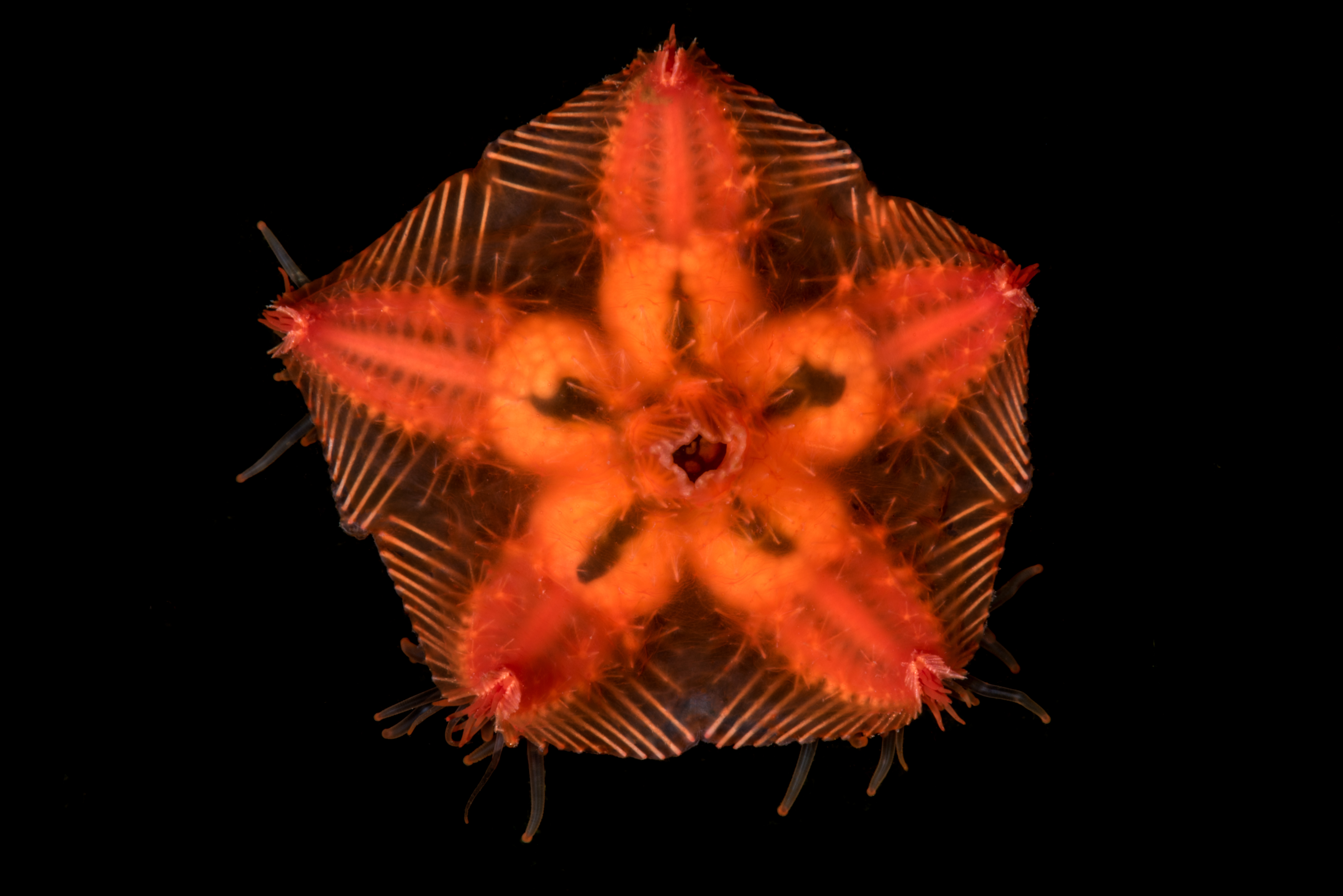
- Hymenaster pellucidus

Scientific classification
- Kingdom: Animalia
- Phylum: Echinodermata
- Class: Asteroidea
- Order: Velatida
- Family: Pterasteridae
- Genus: Hymenaster; Thomson, 1873

= Hymenaster =

Genus of echinoderms

Hymenaster is a genus of sea stars (Asteroidea) of the family Pterasteridae.

== Species list ==
According to the World Register of Marine Species, the genus includes 52 valid species:

- Hymenaster agassizi Verril, 1899
- Hymenaster alcocki Koehler, 1909
- Hymenaster anomalus Sladen, 1882
- Hymenaster bartschi Fisher, 1916
- Hymenaster blevgadi Madsen, 1956
- Hymenaster caelatus Sladen, 1882
- Hymenaster campanulatus Koehler, 1908
- Hymenaster carnosus Sladen, 1882
- Hymenaster coccinatus Sladen, 1882
- Hymenaster coriaceus Koehler, 1920
- Hymenaster cremnodes H.L. Clark, 1920
- Hymenaster crucifer Sladen, 1882
- Hymenaster densus Koehler, 1908
- Hymenaster echinulatus Sladen, 1882
- Hymenaster edax Koehler, 1908
- Hymenaster estcourti McKnight, 1973
- Hymenaster formosus Sladen, 1882
- Hymenaster fucatus Koehler, 1908
- Hymenaster geometricus Sladen, 1882
- Hymenaster giboryi Perrier, 1894
- Hymenaster glaucus Sladen, 1882
- Hymenaster gracilis Ludwig, 1905
- Hymenaster graniferus Sladen, 1882
- Hymenaster infernalis Sladen, 1882
- Hymenaster koehleri Fisher, 1910
- Hymenaster lamprus H.L. Clark, 1923
- Hymenaster latebrosus Sladen, 1882
- Hymenaster modestus Verrill, 1885
- Hymenaster nobilis Wyville Thomson, 1876
- Hymenaster pellucidus Thomson, 1873
- Hymenaster pentagonalis Fisher, 1906
- Hymenaster pergamentaceus Sladen, 1882
- Hymenaster perspicuus Ludwig, 1903
- Hymenaster platyacanthus Ludwig, 1905
- Hymenaster porosissimus Sladen, 1882
- Hymenaster praecoquis Sladen, 1882
- Hymenaster pudicus Koehler, 1920
- Hymenaster pullatus Sladen, 1882
- Hymenaster quadrispinosus Fisher, 1905
- Hymenaster regalis Verrill, 1895
- Hymenaster reticulatus Sibuet, 1976
- Hymenaster rex Perrier, 1885
- Hymenaster rhodopeplus Fisher, 1916
- Hymenaster roseus Koehler, 1907
- Hymenaster sacculatus Sladen, 1882
- Hymenaster tenuispinus Sibuet, 1976
- Hymenaster trias H.L. Clark, 1920
- Hymenaster vicarius Sladen, 1882
- Hymenaster violaceus Ludwig, 1905
- Hymenaster bourgeti Perrier in Filhol, 1885
