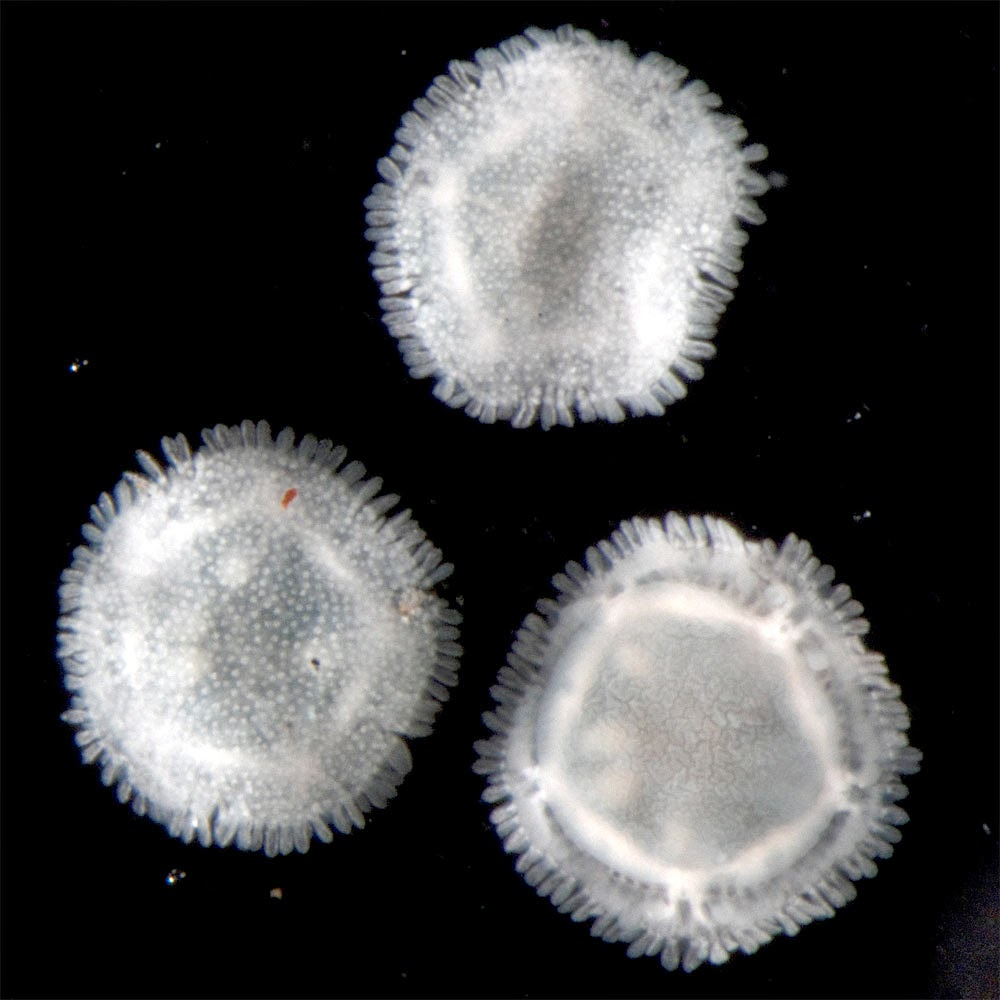

Scientific classification
- Kingdom: Animalia
- Phylum: Echinodermata
- Class: Asteroidea
- Order: Peripodida
- Family: Xyloplacidae
- Genus: Xyloplax
- Species: X. janetae

Binomial name
- Xyloplax janetae Christopher L. Mah, 2006

= Xyloplax janetae =

Species of echinoderm

Xyloplax janetae is a Xyloplax of the family Xyloplacidae. It lives on the surface of wood sunken to abyssal depths.

== Morphology ==
Xyloplax janetae is a flattened disk, from 2–10 millimetres (0.079–0.394 in) in diameter, and about 4 millimetres (0.16 in) thick. It has adambulacral spines which are spines that project radially from the margin of the animal, of distinct morphology. On its dorsal (abactinal surface) it has many projecting abactinal spines whose morphology is distinct from the adambulacral spines.

== Habitat and behaviour ==
Xyloplax janetae is a bathyal abyssal species, meaning it is found in the deepest part of the open ocean. It has only been found clinging to sunken wood.

== Feeding ==
Xyloplax janetae is found clinging to sunken wood, where it feeds on the bacteria which decay the wood.
