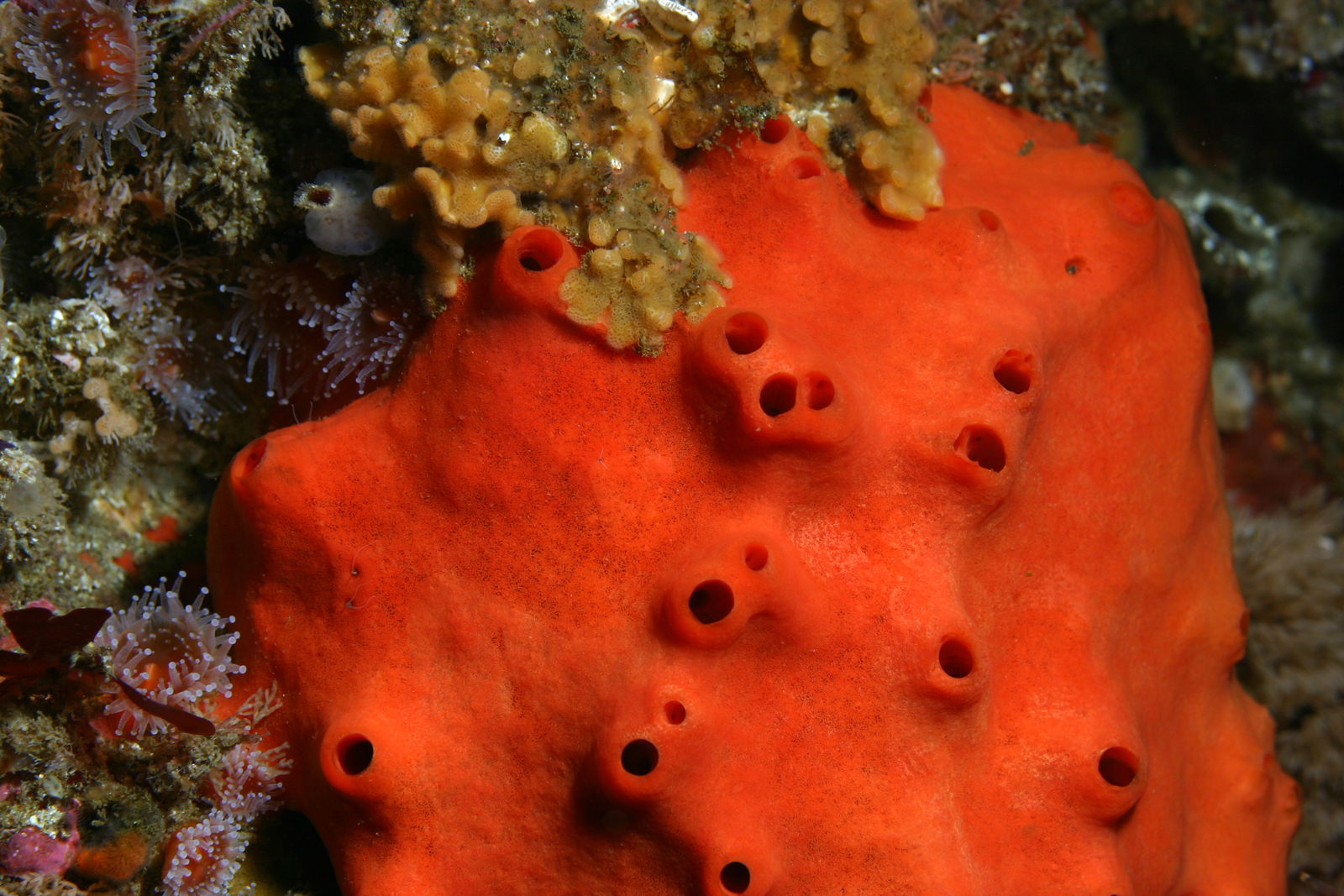
- Acarnus erithacus

Scientific classification
- Kingdom: Animalia
- Phylum: Porifera
- Class: Demospongiae
- Order: Poecilosclerida
- Family: Acarnidae (Dendy, 1922)

Genera
- See text.

Synonyms
- Cornulidae Lévi & Lévi, 1983; Iophoneae Burton, 1929; Iophonidae Burton, 1929

= Acarnidae =

Family of sponges

Acarnidae is a family of sponges belonging to the order Poecilosclerida. It has a global distribution, although several genera occur primarily in colder temperate waters, and several have very restricted ranges. It is estimated that there are several hundred species.

== Description ==
Species form encrusting, massive, fan-shaped or digitate (small, un-splitting branches growing from a spreading base) growth forms that may burrow into the substrate. The species of many genera produce fistules.

The outer skeleton is made of tylotes (long, slender megascleres with knobs at both ends) which may be modified to have a spined base as well as strongyles (megascleres with both ends blunt or rounded). These form tangential and/or paratangential tracts, often with an irregular or halichondroid arrangement.

The inner skeleton is made of styles (megascleres with end pointed and the other end rounded) or modified styles. These form massive networks to create isodictyal (triangular meshes in which each side is one spicule long), isotropic (no differentiation into primary or secondary tracts, lines or fibers), anisotropic (primary and secondary tracts, lines or fibers) or more irregular skeletons. In encrusting forms they form plumose (skeletal structures radiate from primary fibres or spicule tracts) or hymedesmioid (monoaxon megascleres arranged singly with the heads fixed to a spongin base with the points directed outwards) skeletons instead.

Spined spicules may be present or absent. When present, they take the form of acanthostyles (spiny styles) and/or unique cladotylotes (megascleres with 4-8 or even more axial branches and tubercles). Spined microscleres include palmate isochelaes and various toxas (microscleres that are curved like a bow). Both may, however, be lost in some species. Some genera also have other microscleres such as modified anisochelae such as the bipocillae (chellae with fused wings) of Iophon), microrhabd-like spicules (modified microxeas or microstrongyles) and diamond-shaped microxeas (modified toxas).

== Genera ==
The following genera are recognised:

- Acanthorhabdus (Burton, 1929)
- Acarnus (Gray, 1867)
- Acheliderma (Topsent, 1892)
- Cornulella (Dendy, 1922)
- Cornulum (Carter, 1876)
- Damiria (Keller, 1891)
- Dolichacantha (Hentschel, 1914)
- Iophon (Gray, 1867)
- Megaciella (Hallmann, 1920)
- Paracornulum (Hallmann, 1920)
- Tedaniphorbas (Laubenfels, 1936)
- Wigginsia (de Laubenfels, 1936)
- Zyzzya (Laubenfels, 1936)
