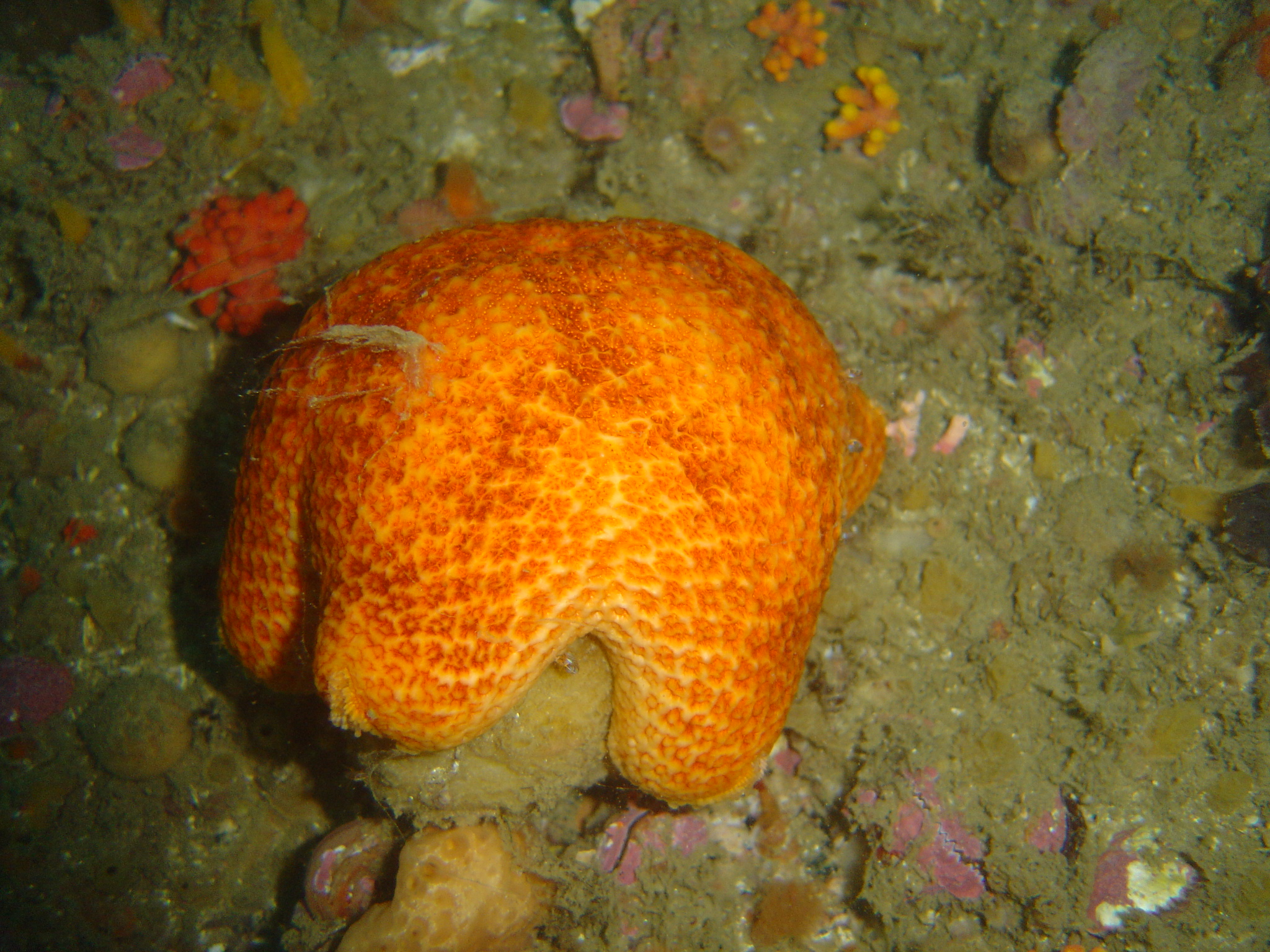
- Pteraster capensis

Scientific classification
- Kingdom: Animalia
- Phylum: Echinodermata
- Class: Asteroidea
- Order: Velatida
- Family: Pterasteridae; Perrier, 1875

Genera
- See text

= Pterasteridae =

Pterasteridae Temporal range: Campanian–Recent

Family of starfishes

Pterasteridae is a family of sea stars in the order Velatida, consisting of eight genera.

== Description and characteristics ==
Pterasterids are primarily deep-water, and have an inflated aboral surface. Like many other members of the ordo Velatida, they have a hole in the middle of the central disc called "osculum", from which they can expel mucus for defending against predators.

Many species brood their young in an internal chamber flushed with seawater.

Fossil pterasterids have been found as early as the upper Campanian of the Cretaceous period.

== Genera ==
According to the World Register of Marine Species :

- Amembranaster Golotsvan, 1998 -- 1 species
- Benthaster Sladen, 1882 -- 3 species
- Calyptraster Sladen, 1882 -- 5 species
- Diplopteraster Verrill, 1880 -- 7 species
- Euretaster Fisher, 1940 -- 3 species
- Hymenaster Thomson, 1873 -- 51 species
- Hymenasterides Fisher, 1911 -- 2 species
- Pteraster Müller & Troschel, 1842 -- 46 species
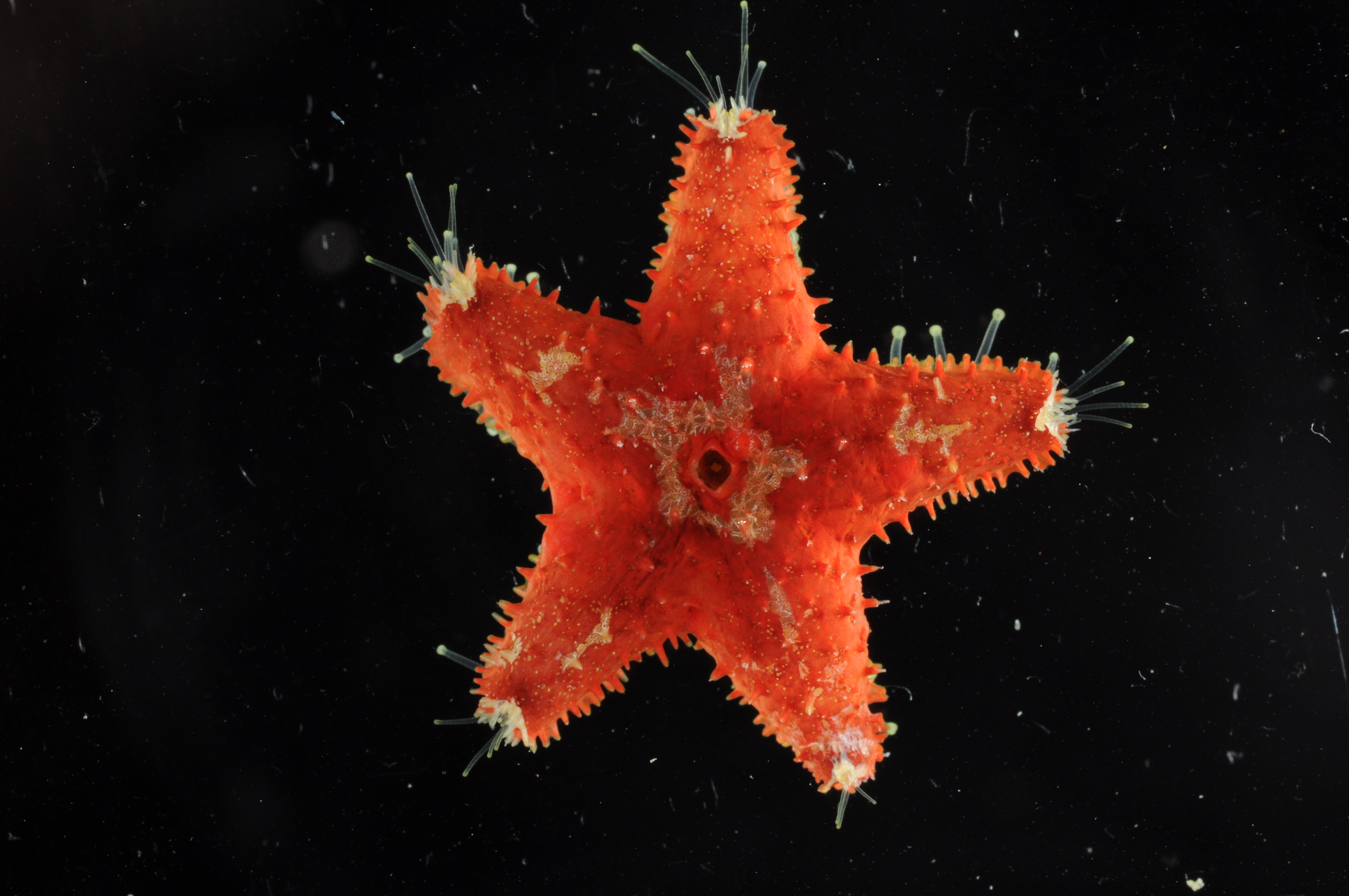
Euretaster insignis

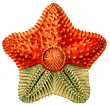
Hymenaster echinulatus (both faces)

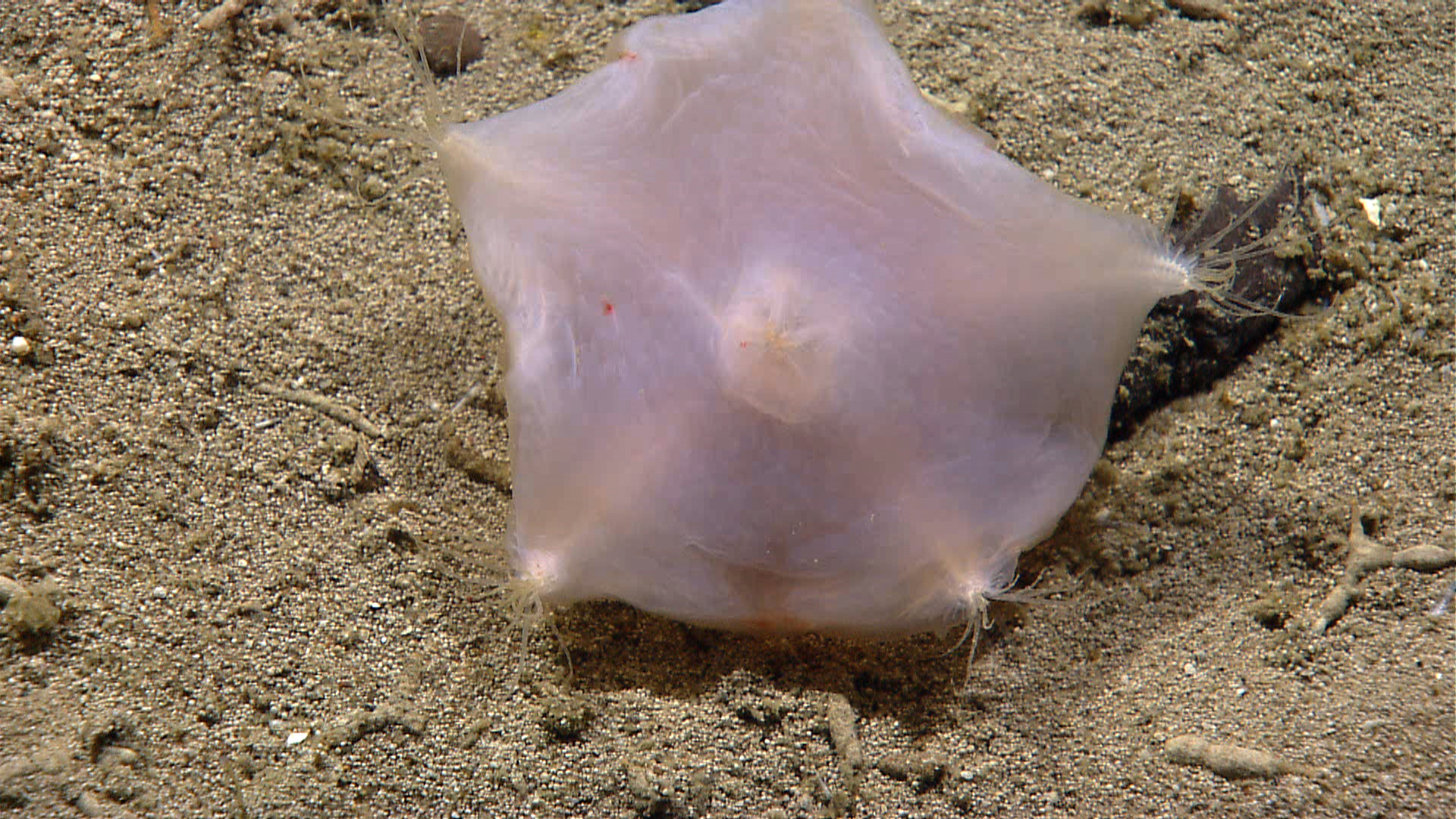
Hymenaster sp.

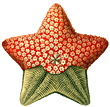
Pteraster stellifer (both faces)

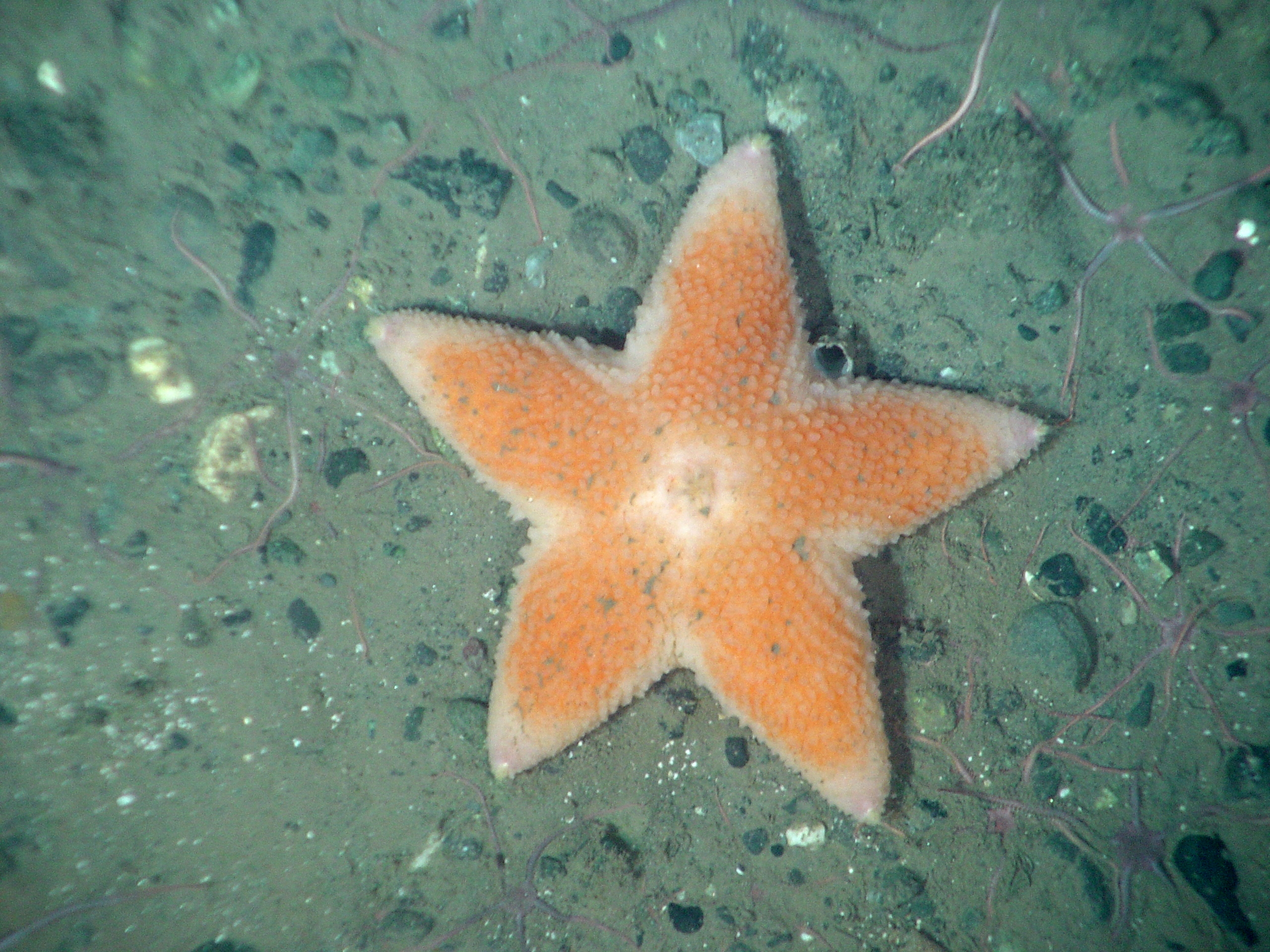
Pteraster sp.
