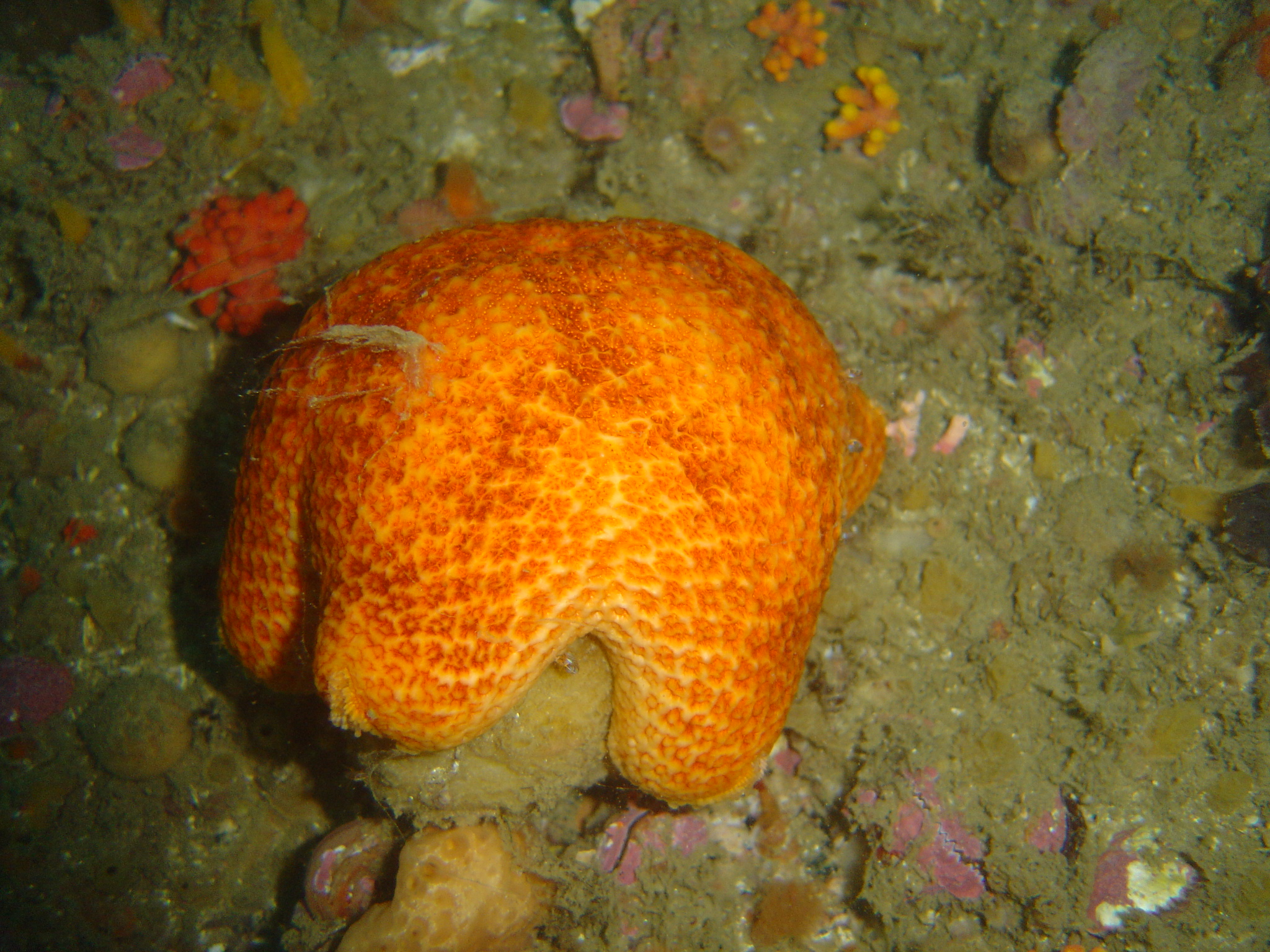
- Pteraster capensis

Scientific classification
- Kingdom: Animalia
- Phylum: Echinodermata
- Class: Asteroidea
- Order: Velatida; Perrier, 1884

Families
- 5, see text

= Velatida =

Order of starfishes

The Velatida are an order of sea stars containing about 200 species in five families. These sea stars normally have thick bodies with large discs.

== Description and characteristics ==
This order contains mostly deep or cold seas sea stars, often with a wide distribution (sometimes global). They have a pentagonal or star shape, with between 5 and 15 arms. Their skeleton is weakly developed, which confers them a good flexibility, and numerous papillae on the aboral surface allow them to breathe in poorly oxygenated waters. Their pedicellariae are often provided with spines. The smallest are Caymanostellidae (between 0,5 and 3 cm) and the biggest Pterasteridae (up to 30 cm).

== Taxonomy ==
New molecular evidence now suggests a relationship between some velatid and valvatid families.

List of families according to World Register of Marine Species:

- Caymanostellidae Belyaev, 1974
- Korethrasteridae Danielssen & Koren, 1884
- Myxasteridae Perrier, 1885
- Pterasteridae Perrier, 1875
- †Tropidasteridae Wright, 1880
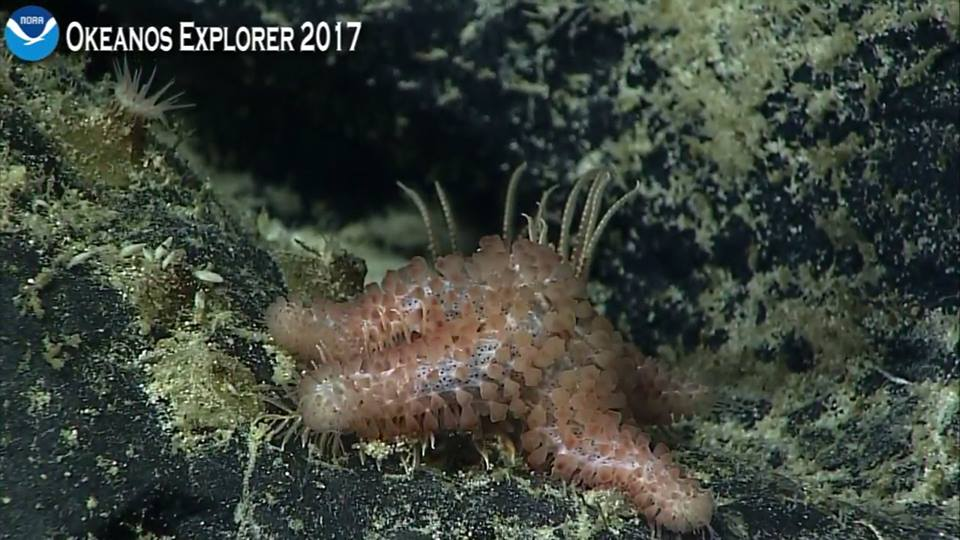
Peribolaster sp., Korethrasteridae

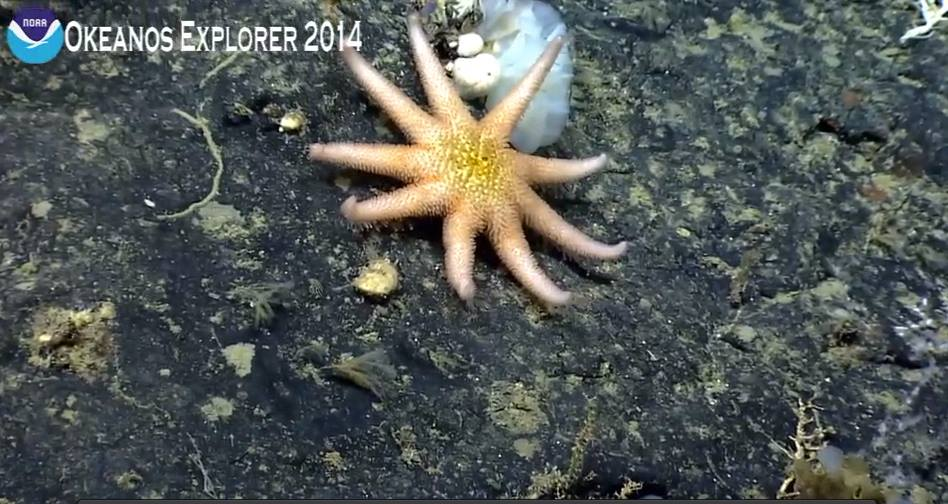
Myxaster sp., Myxasteridae

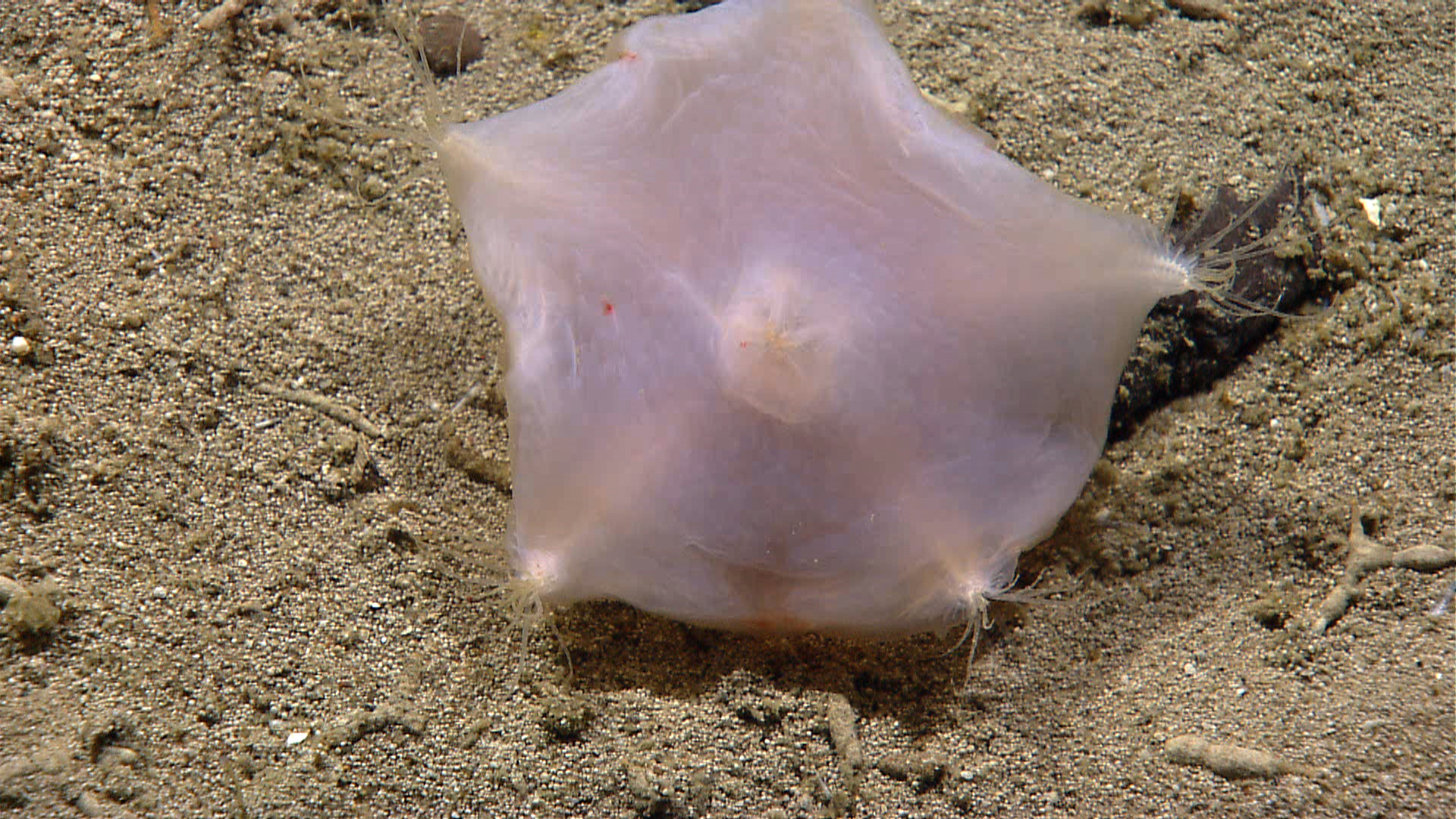
Hymenaster sp., Pterasteridae
