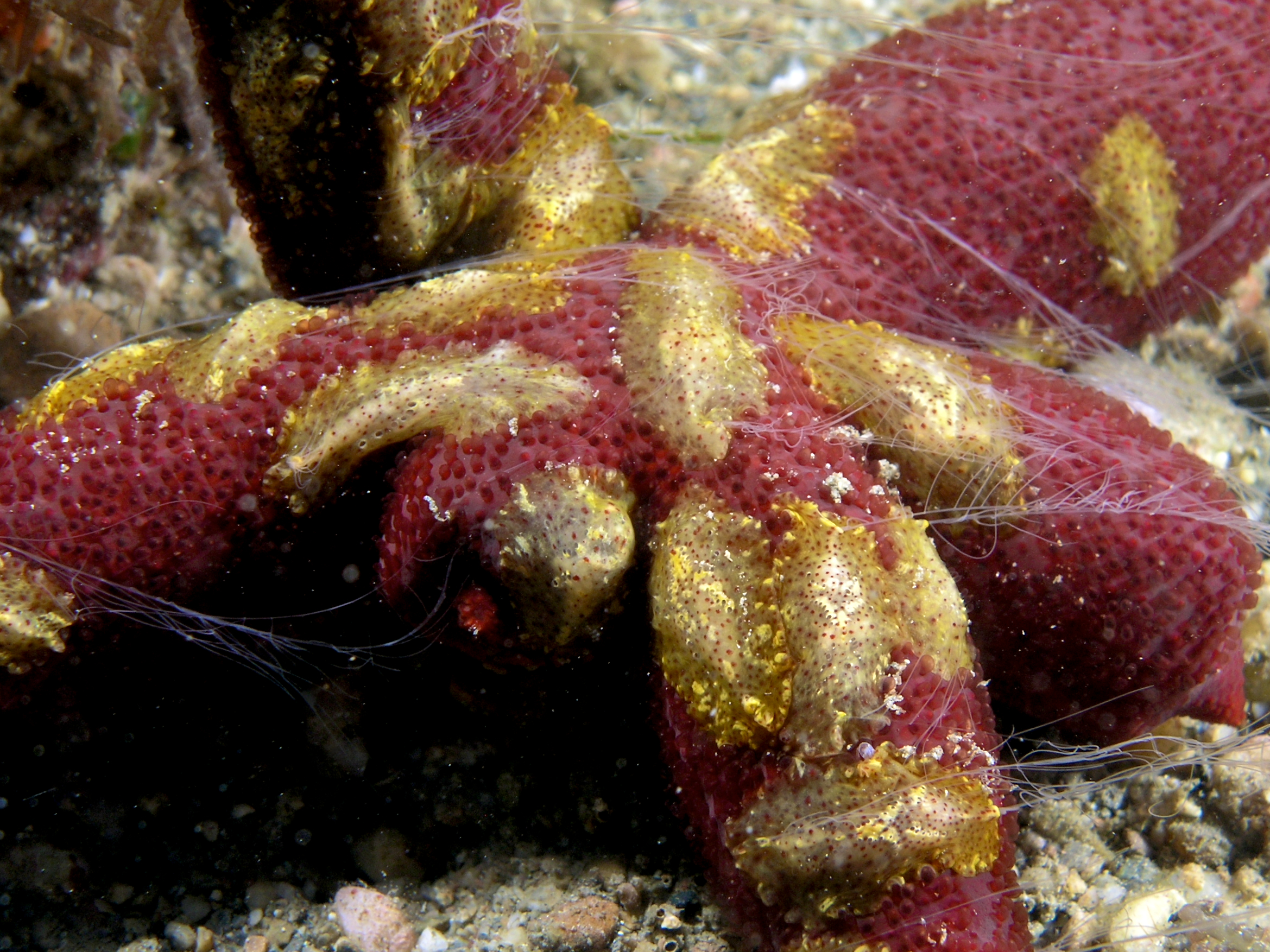
- Coeloplana astericola on Echinaster luzonicus (Echinodermata: Asteroidea)

Scientific classification
- Domain: Eukaryota
- Kingdom: Animalia
- Phylum: Ctenophora
- Class: Tentaculata
- Subclass: Typhlocoela; Ospovat, 1985

Orders
- Cydippida; Platyctenida

= Typhlocoela =

Subclass of comb jellies

Typhlocoela is a subclass of ctenophores.
