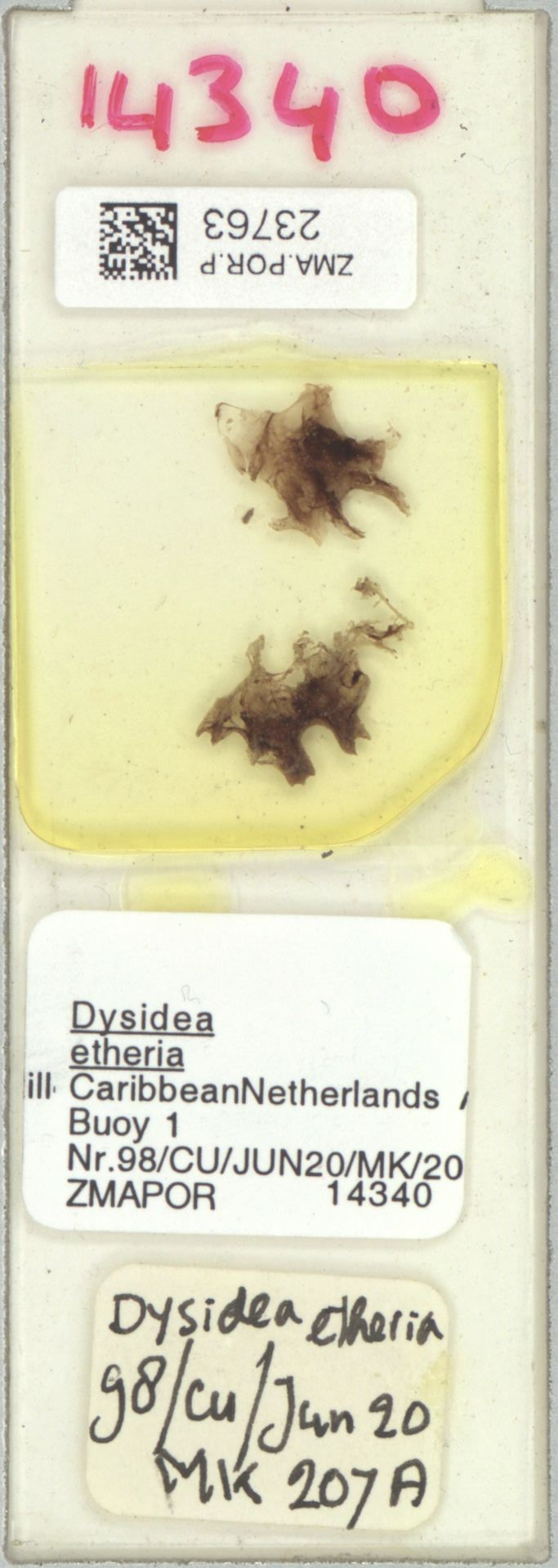
- A preserved specimen from the Caribbean

Scientific classification
- Kingdom: Animalia
- Phylum: Porifera
- Class: Demospongiae
- Order: Dictyoceratida
- Family: Dysideidae
- Genus: Dysidea
- Species: D. etheria

Binomial name
- Dysidea etheria Laubenfels, 1936

= Dysidea etheria =

Species of sponge

Dysidea etheria, commonly known as the ethereal sponge or heavenly sponge, is a species of lobate sponge within the class Demospongiae. This marine sponge is known for its light blue color and can be found in the Caribbean as well as off the coasts of Florida and Georgia. Like all other poriferans, D. etheria is capable of both sexual and asexual reproduction. The use of spicule collection as well as chemical defenses allows D. etheria to protect itself against predators such as the zebra doris and the orange knobby star. D. etheria is also known as a host species of the invasive brittle star Ophiothela mirabilis. Lastly, various molecular biology studies have utilized D. etheria to both study foreign particle transport in sponges and to isolate novel molecules.

== Etymology ==
The specific epithet "etheria" was given to this species of sponge by Laubenfels upon its discovery in the Dry Tortugas in 1936 due to its sky-blue color.

== Description ==
Dysidea etheria is a species of lobate sponge that are massive and semi-incrusting. They are identifiable by their internal and external light blue coloration. The exopinacoderm has also been observed to be colored a brownish grey.

The shaping of the sponge's lobes have been described as elongated, digitated, or lamellar. The size of D. etheria can range from ten to fifteen centimeters in width and four to seven centimeters in height. The diameter of the sponge's lobes have been observed to range from two to four centimeters.

The sponge's oscula, ranging from five to ten millimeters in width, are typically found on the tops of its lobes. The oscula also have a transparent iris-membrane, and the oscular membrane openings have occasionally been observed to be compound. One millimeter high sharp conules make up the surface of the sponge and are spaced three millimeters apart.

D. etheria has a thin exopinacoderm and a flesh-like choanosome. The sponge also has an irregular skeleton which is loosely fibroreticular. Calcareous debris is contained within the white fibers with which the skeleton is made up of.

== Habitat and distribution ==
Found within marine environments of depths reaching up to 40 meters, D. etheria inhabits bays and lagoons. This species has been spotted on a variety of natural and manmade substrates. A majority of such substrates are known to be hard and vertical, such as on docks or pilings. Another manmade substrate is the hull of a concrete ship where D. etheria was seen on a scleractinian. As for natural substrates, D. etheria has been seen on rocks, turtle grass blades, mangrove roots, mollusk and crab shells, coral skeletons, algae, and even other sponges.

D. etheria is known to be distributed across the Caribbean as well as off the coasts of Florida and Georgia.

== Ecology ==
=== Reproduction ===
Both sexual and asexual reproduction are utilized by poriferans. Sponges are hermaphroditic when sexual reproduction occurs, utilizing different timing of sperm and egg production. D. etheria asexually reproduce through fragmentation. The totipotent abilities of sponge cells allows for fragments of the sponge to regrow into a new sponge.

=== Predators ===
The nudibranch Felimare zebra, and the sea star Echinaster echinophorus have both been spotted preying on D. etheria.

=== Defenses ===
Through the collection and storage of spicule fragments within the mesohyl, D. etheria is capable of deterring predators. The production of toxins is also believed to act as a defense against predators. Chemical extracts from D. etheria have been shown to be deterrents to generalist reef fishes, hermit crabs, and sea stars.

=== Host species ===
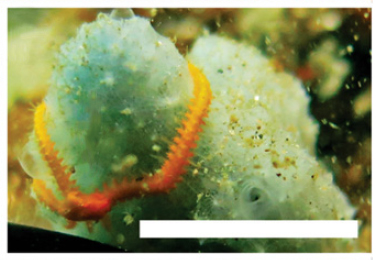
Ophiothela mirabilis on host species Dysidea etheria

D. etheria is registered as one of many host species of the invasive brittle star Ophiothela mirabilis. Utilizing a host species is believed to protect O. mirabilis from predation and allow for new environments to be colonized more easily.

== Biochemistry ==
D. etheria was the first recorded sponge to have plant growth regulatory indoles isolated from it. The plant growth regulator, indole-3-acetamide, promotes the growth of roots in lettuce seedlings.

A new protein phosphatase inhibitor, named dysidiolide, was also isolated from D. etheria.

D. etheria has also been utilized in research to understand how sponges transport foreign particles to specific locations within their bodies. Mesohyl cells have been observed to migrate in a coordinated fashion that allows for organized transport of particles.
