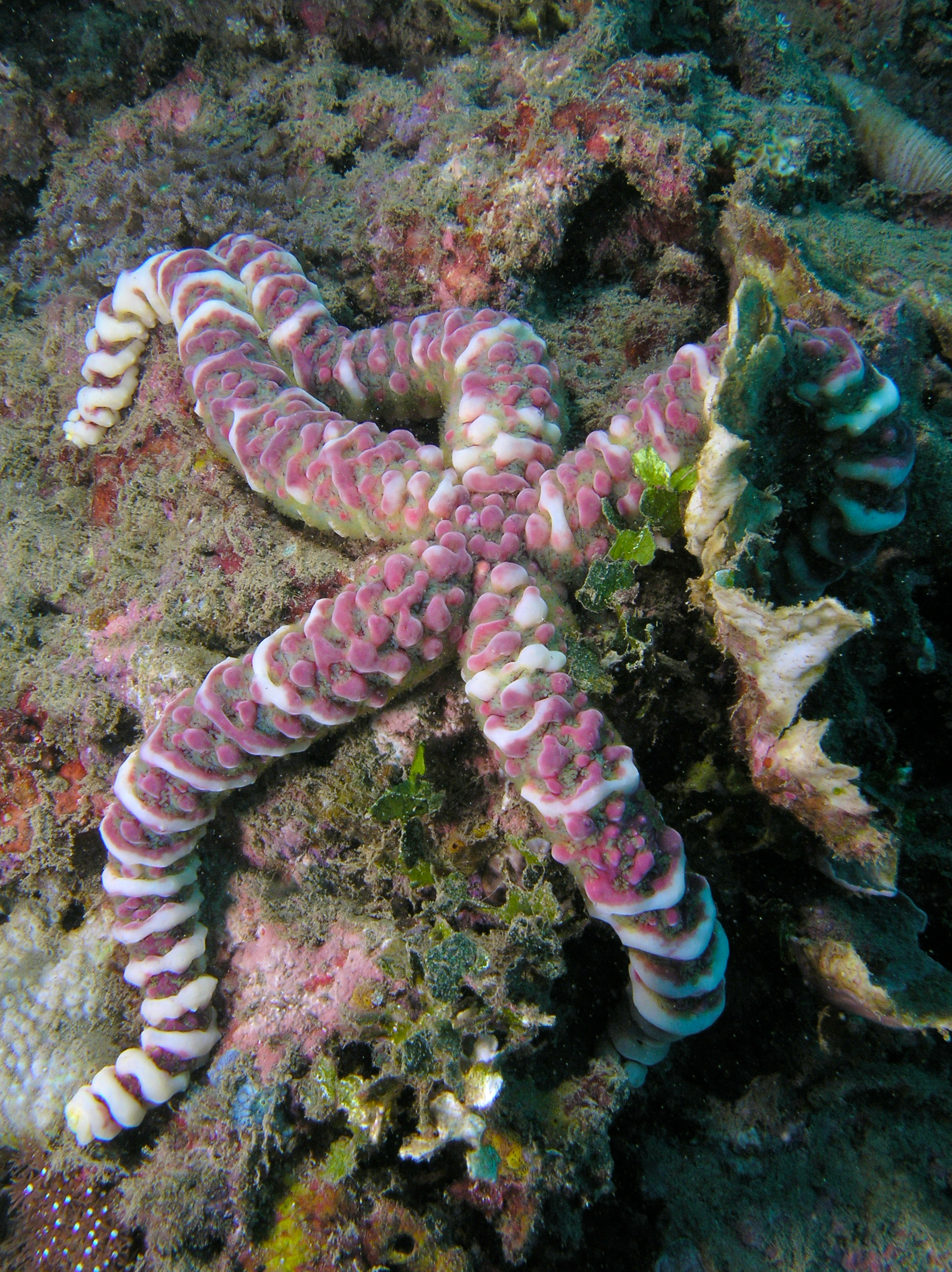

Scientific classification
- Domain: Eukaryota
- Kingdom: Animalia
- Phylum: Echinodermata
- Class: Asteroidea
- Order: Spinulosida
- Family: Echinasteridae
- Genus: Echinaster
- Species: E. callosus

Binomial name
- Echinaster callosus Marenzeller, 1895

= Echinaster callosus =

Warty sea star

Species of starfish

Echinaster callosus, the warty sea star or the banded bubble star, is a species of starfish found in shallow parts of the western Indo-Pacific region. The disc and five slender arms are covered with white, pink, red or violet warts, often forming transverse bands of colour on the arms.

== Description ==
Growing to a maximum diameter of 26 cm (10 in), Echinaster callosus has a small central disc and five slender cylindrical arms. The aboral (upper) surface is densely covered by warty protuberances. The colour of this starfish is variable, but may be orange, pink or violet, with the warts being a contrasting colour, usually white, pink, red or mauve. The white warts often occur in bands, particularly towards the tips of the arms. There are small yellowish-green retractable pedicellaria between the warts. The oral (under) surface of the starfish is white with white warts. There are ambulacral grooves on the underside of the arms along which food is passed by ciliary action. The tip of each arm bears an eyespot, as well as a bundle of suckers.

== Distribution and habitat ==
E. callosus is found in the tropical and subtropical western Indo-Pacific, its range extending from East Africa and the Red Sea to Micronesia, and from Japan southwards to Australia and New Caledonia. It occurs on coral reefs and on soft sediment, at depths between 5 and 30 m (20 and 100 ft).

== Ecology ==
The creeping comb jelly Coeloplana astericola sometimes live symbiotically on the aboral surface of this starfish, as well as on the Luzon sea star, Echinaster luzonicus. Other associates are small worms and crustaceans, which do little harm, and the triton Charonia tritonis and the harlequin shrimp Hymenocera picta, which both feed destructively on its tissues.
