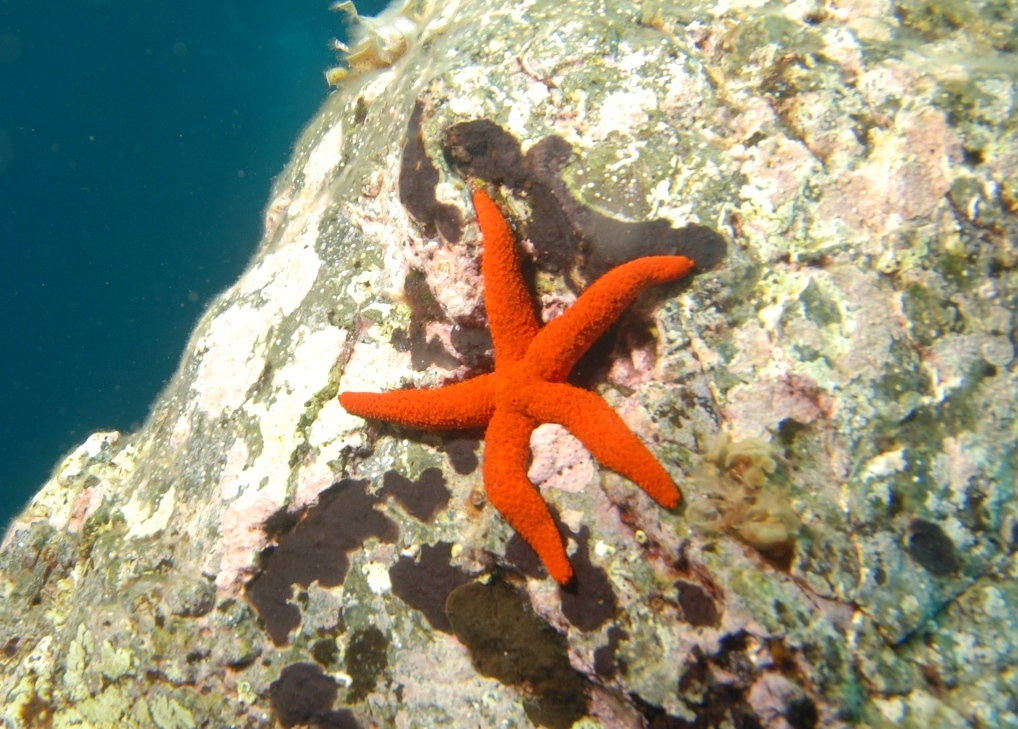
- Echinaster sepositus

Scientific classification
- Kingdom: Animalia
- Phylum: Echinodermata
- Class: Asteroidea
- Order: Spinulosida
- Family: Echinasteridae
- Genus: Echinaster; Verrill, 1870

Species
- see text

Synonyms
- Rhopia Gray, 1840; Thyraster Ives, 1890; Verrillaster Downey, 1973

= Echinaster =

Genus of starfishes

Echinaster is a well-studied and common genus of starfish containing ~30 species and is the second-largest genus found within the family Echinasteridae. The genera Henricia and Echinaster encompass 90% of all the species found within the family Echinasteridae. It contains 30 species, however the number of species in this genus is still debatable because of uncertainty within the genera. This genus is currently sub-divided into two sub-genera: Echinaster and Othilia, evolutionary relationships between the sub-genera is not understood. Echinaster are found in the Pacific, Atlantic and Indian oceans, with most species being studied in the Gulf of Mexico and Brazil. The sub-genera Othilia is thought to encompass species mainly found in the Gulf of Mexico and Brazil. Echinaster is often one of the most studied species within the family Echinasteridae and is often used to find evolutionary relationships.

Many species found within Echinaster are red, orange, or pink in coloration.

== Species ==
The genus echinaster includes 61 known species:

- Sub-genus Echinaster (Echinaster) Müller & Troschel, 1840
  - Echinaster modestus Perrier, 1881 -- Caribbean
  - Echinaster reticulatus H.L. Clark, 1923 -- South-east Atlantic
  - Echinaster sepositus (Retzius, 1783) -- Mediterranean
- Echinaster arcystatus H.L. Clark, 1914 -- south-east Australia
- Echinaster callosus Marenzeller, 1895 -- Indo-Pacific
- Echinaster colemani Rowe & Albertson, 1987 -- South-east Australia & NZ
- Echinaster cylindricus Meissner, 1892 -- Peru
- Echinaster farquhari Benham, 1909 -- New Zealand
- Echinaster glomeratus H.L. Clark, 1916 -- Southern Australia
- Echinaster luzonicus (Gray, 1840) -- Tropical Pacific
- Echinaster panamensis Leipoldt, 1895 -- Panama
- Echinaster parvispinus A.H. Clark, 1916 -- Gulf of California
- Echinaster purpureus (Gray, 1840) -- Indian ocean
- Echinaster smithi Ludwig, 1903 -- Antarctica
- Echinaster stereosomus Fisher, 1913 -- From western Australia to Philippines (5-150 m)
- Echinaster superbus H.L. Clark, 1916 -- Australia (north-west)
- Echinaster varicolor H.L. Clark, 1938 -- New Caledonia and Australia
- Sub-genus Echinaster (Othilia) Gray, 1840
  - Echinaster aculeata (Gray, 1840) -- Costa Rica & Nicaragua
  - Echinaster brasiliensis Müller & Troschel, 1842 -- Caribbean
  - Echinaster echinophorus (Lamarck, 1816) -- Caribbean
  - Echinaster graminicola Campbell & Turner, 1984 -- Caribbean
  - Echinaster guyanensis A.M. Clark, 1987 -- Caribbean
  - Echinaster paucispinus A.M. Clark, 1987 -- Caribbean
  - Echinaster sentus (Say, 1825) -- Caribbean
  - Echinaster serpentarius Müller & Troschel, 1842 -- Caribbean
  - Echinaster spinulosus Verrill, 1869 -- Caribbean
  - Echinaster tenuispinus Verrill, 1871 -- Caribbean

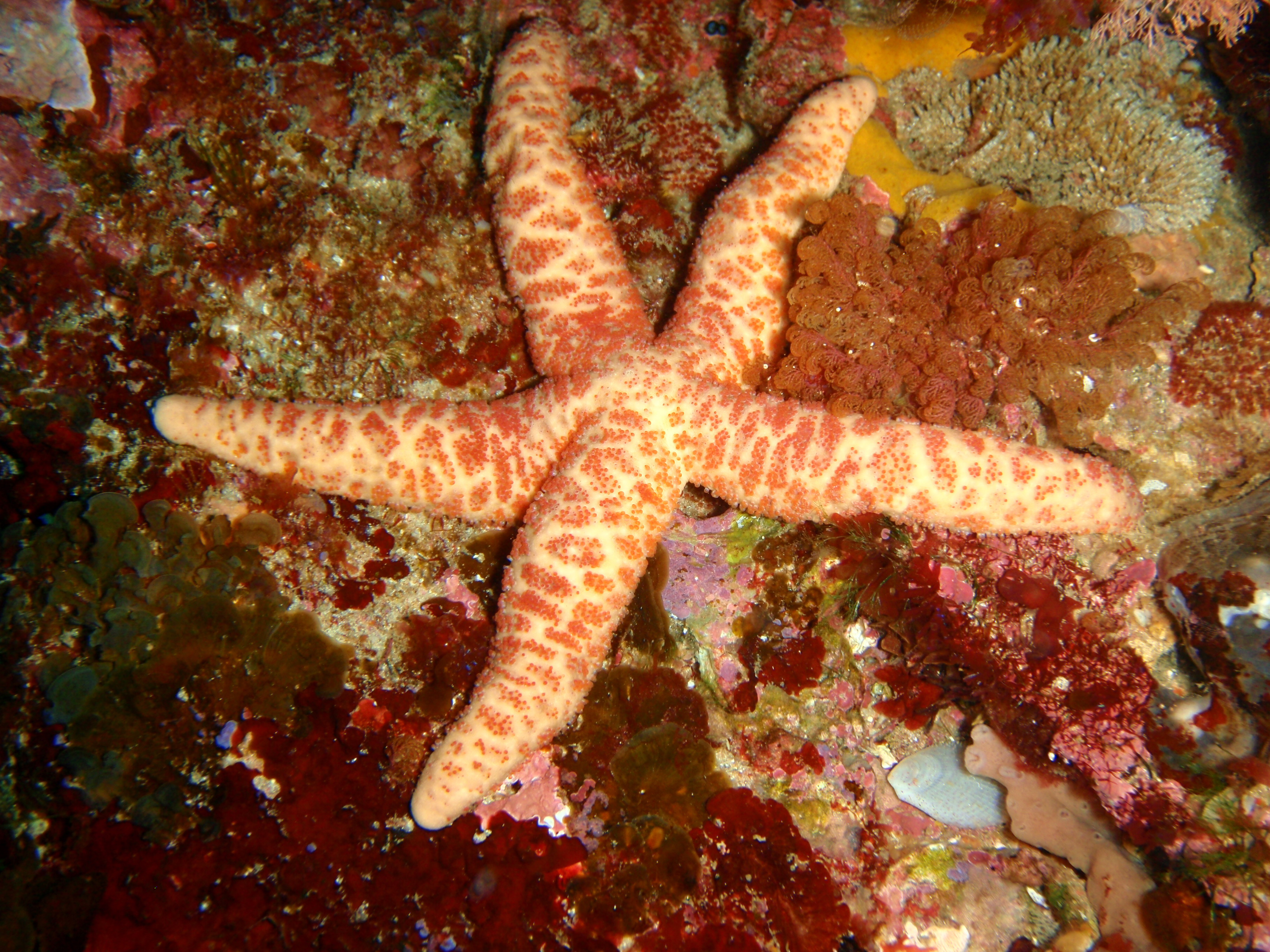
Echinaster arcystatus

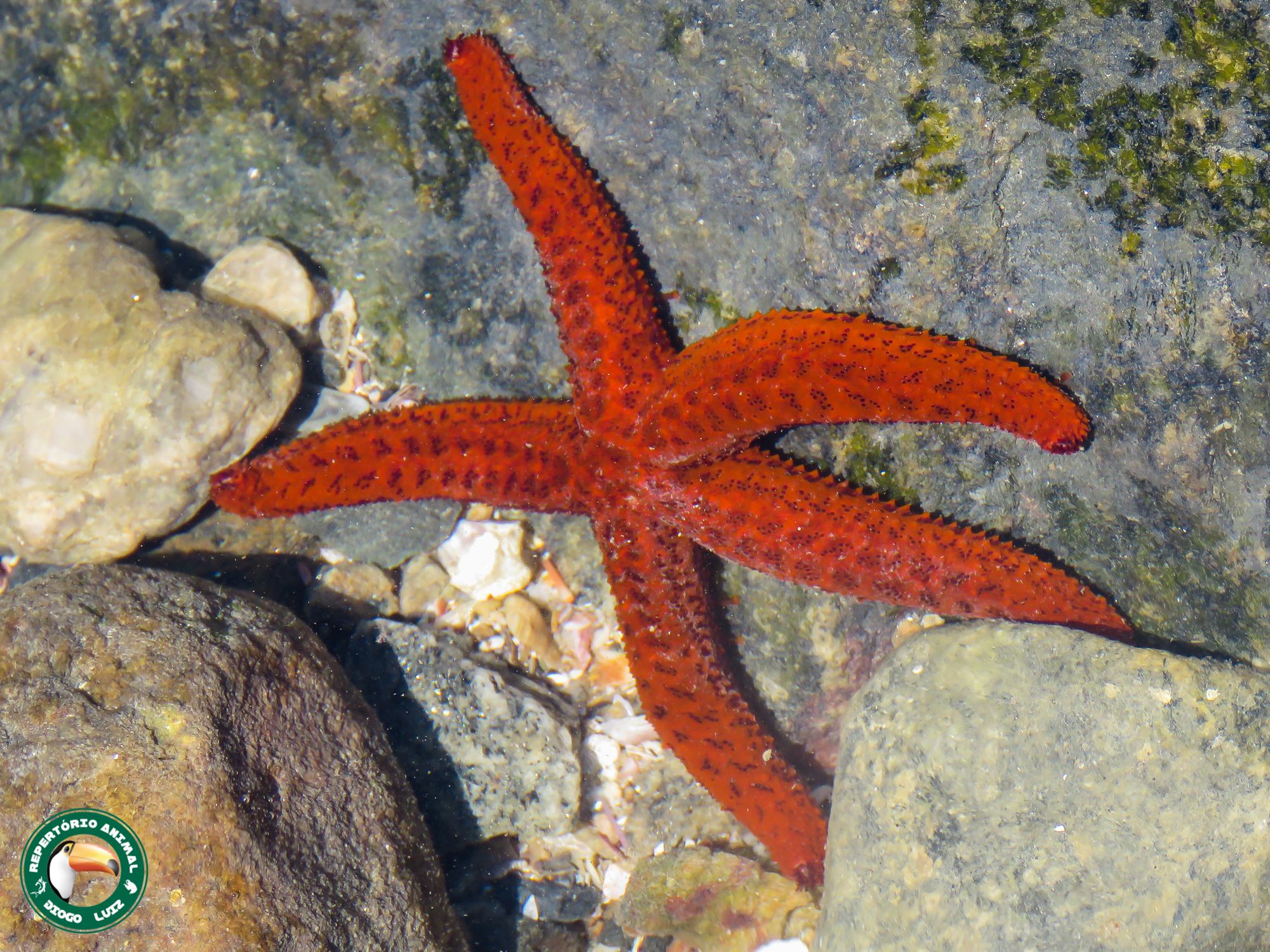
Echinaster brasiliensis

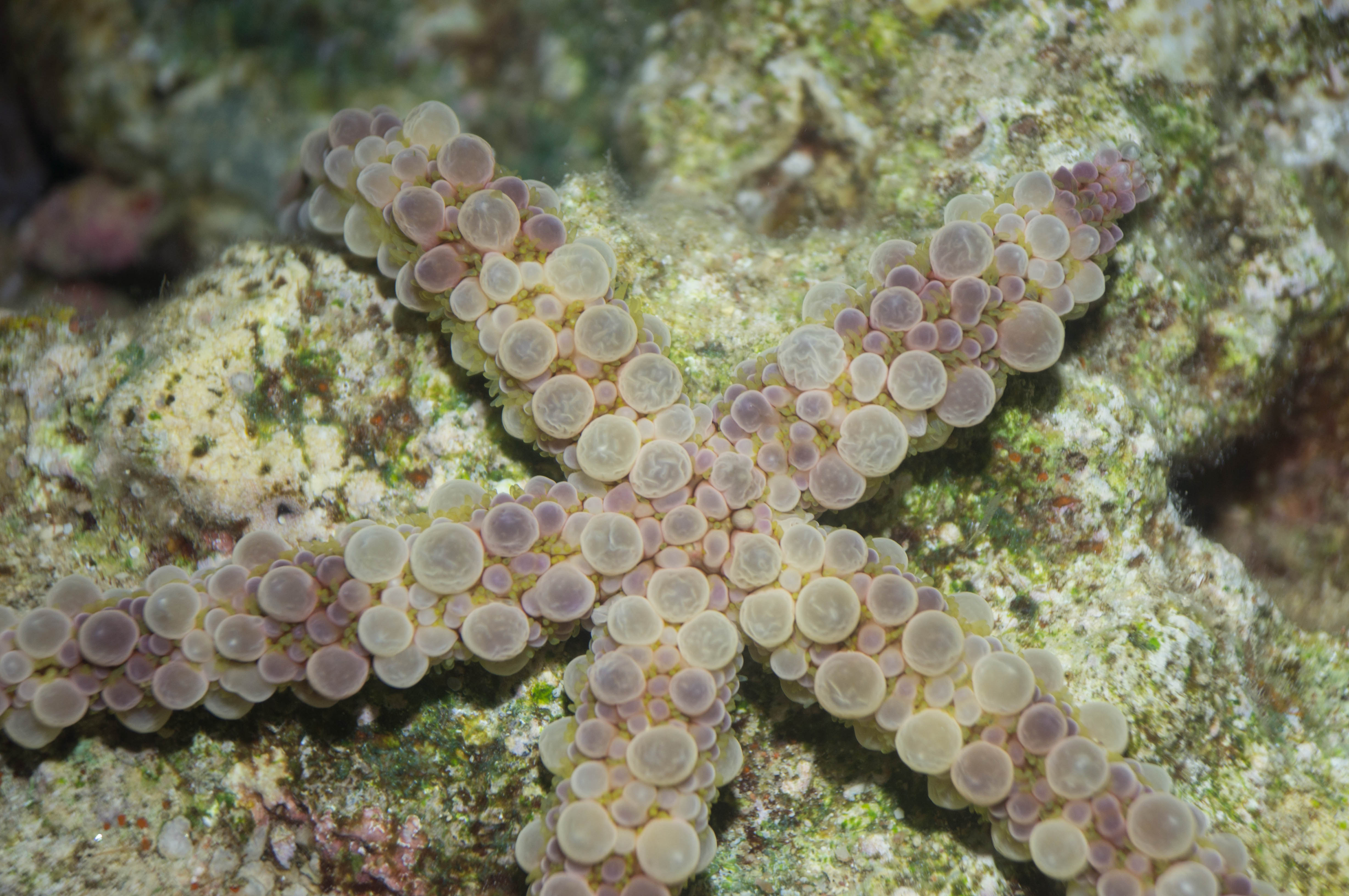
Echinaster callosus

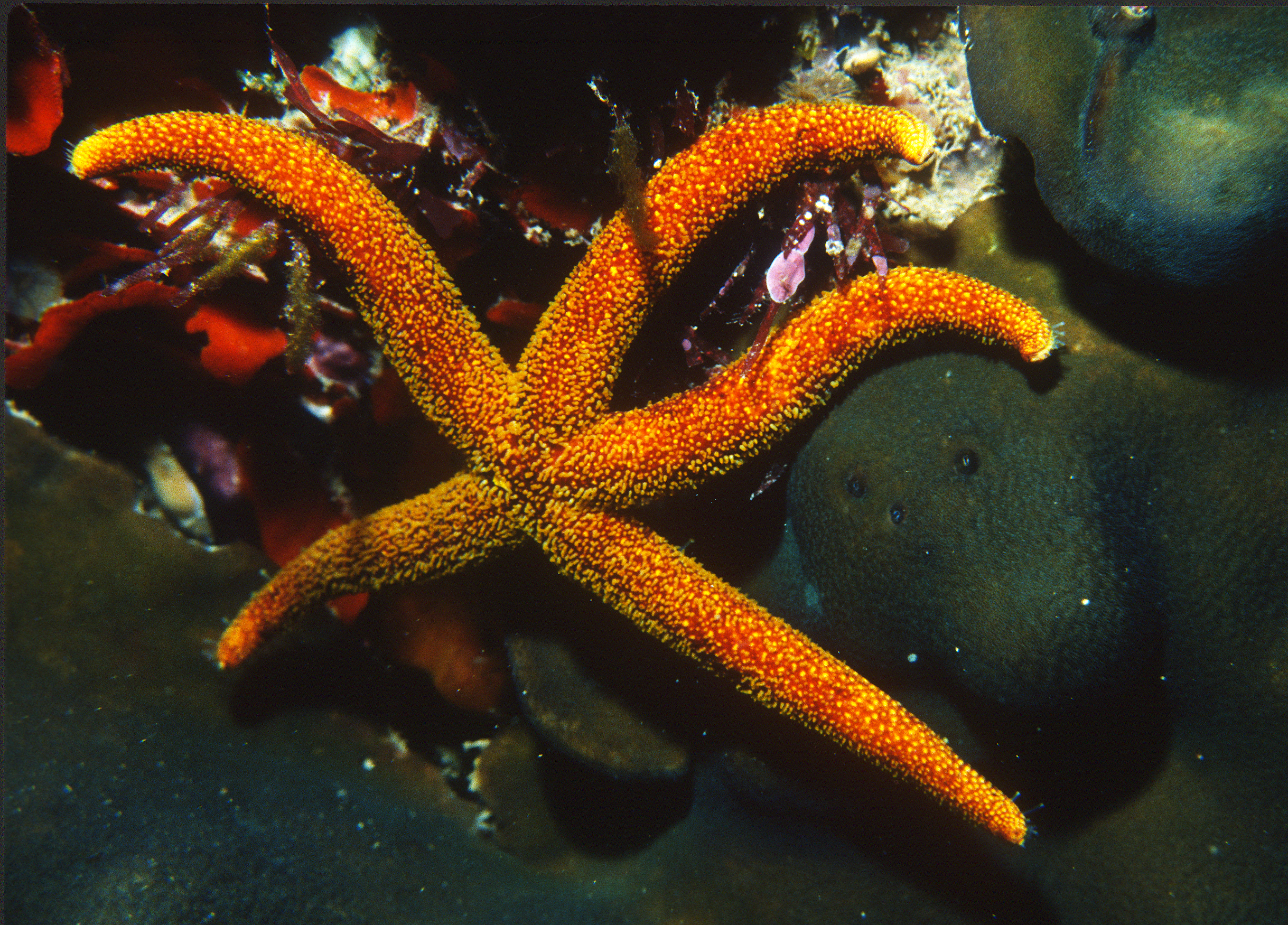
Echinaster colemani

Echinaster cribella

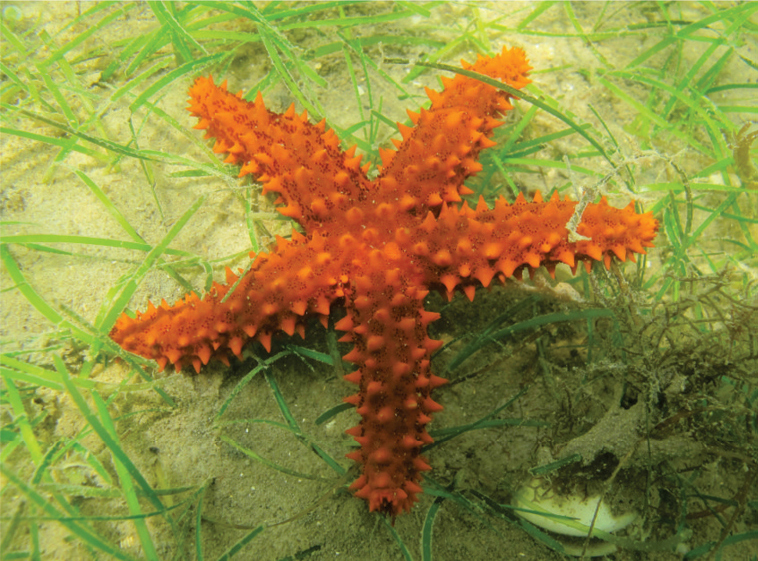
Echinaster echinophorus

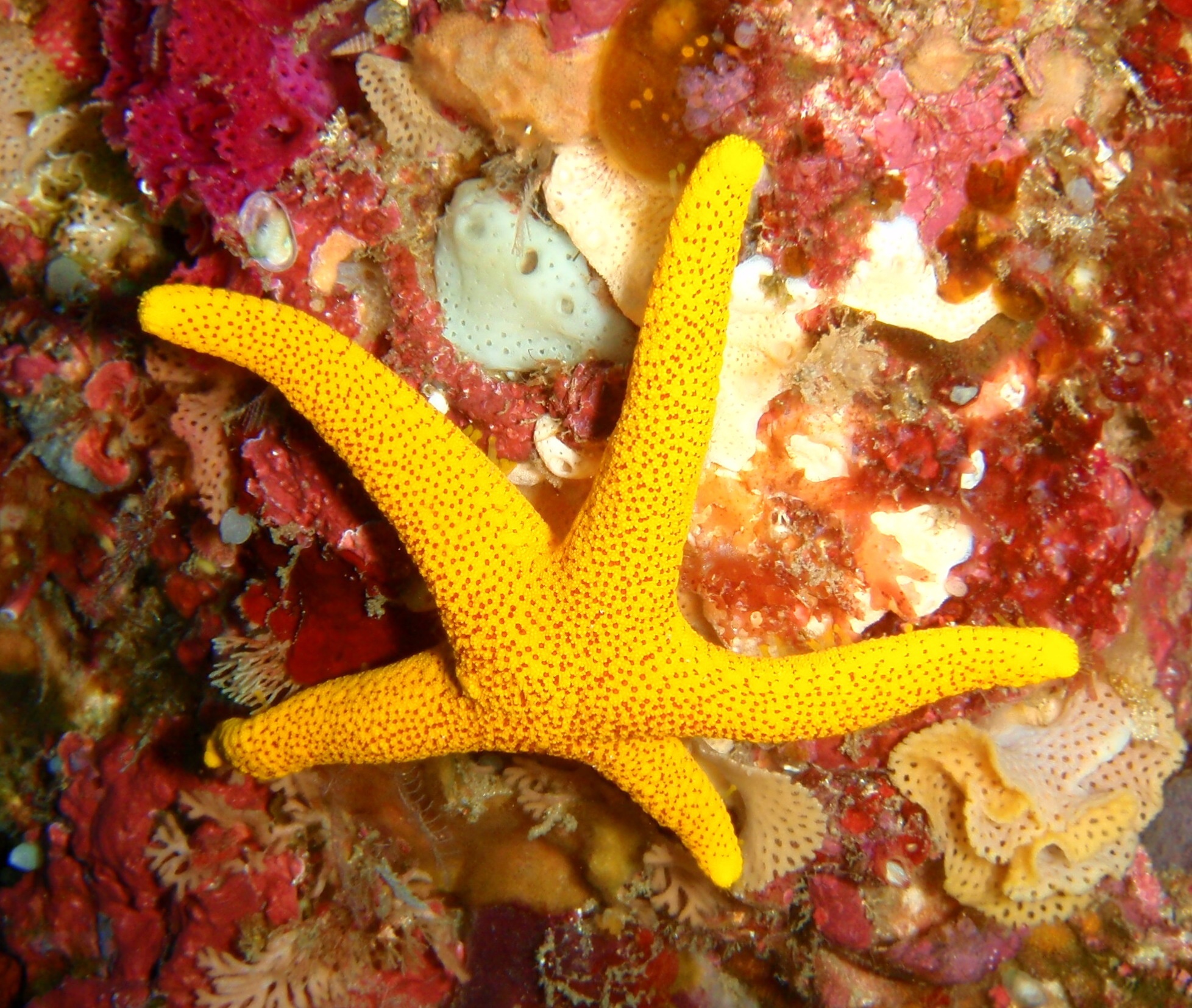
Echinaster glomeratus

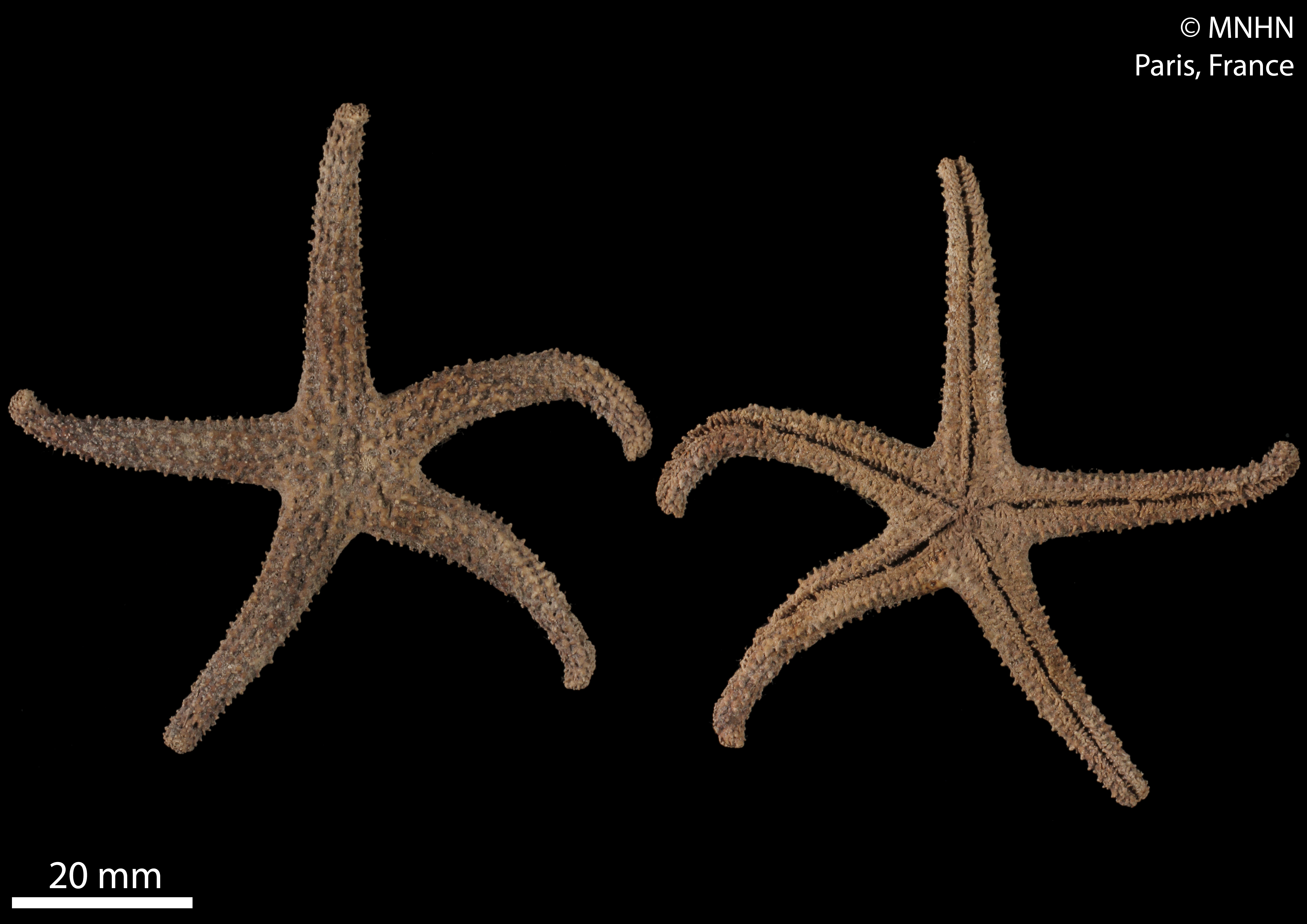
Echinaster gracilis

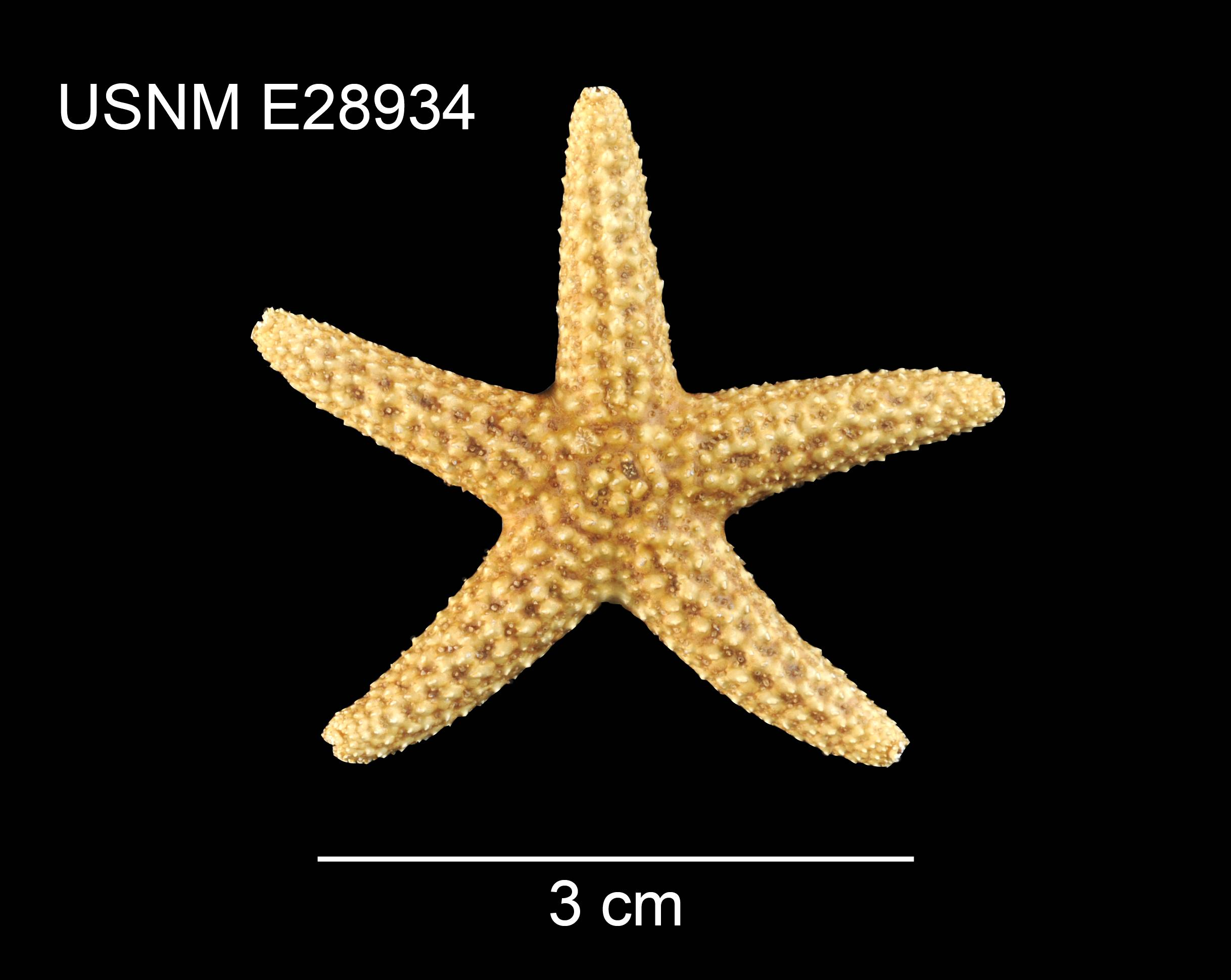
Echinaster graminicola

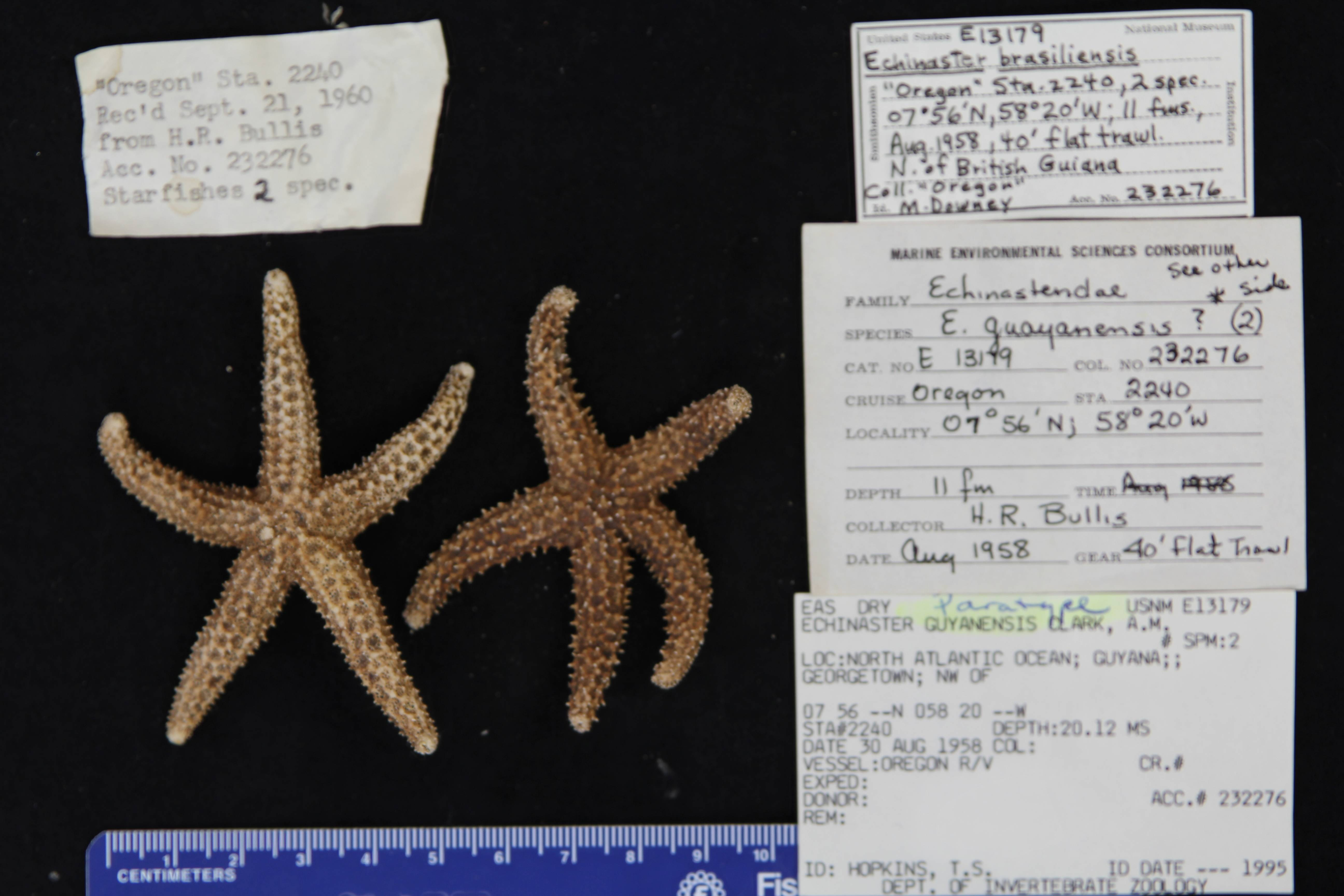
Echinaster guyanensis

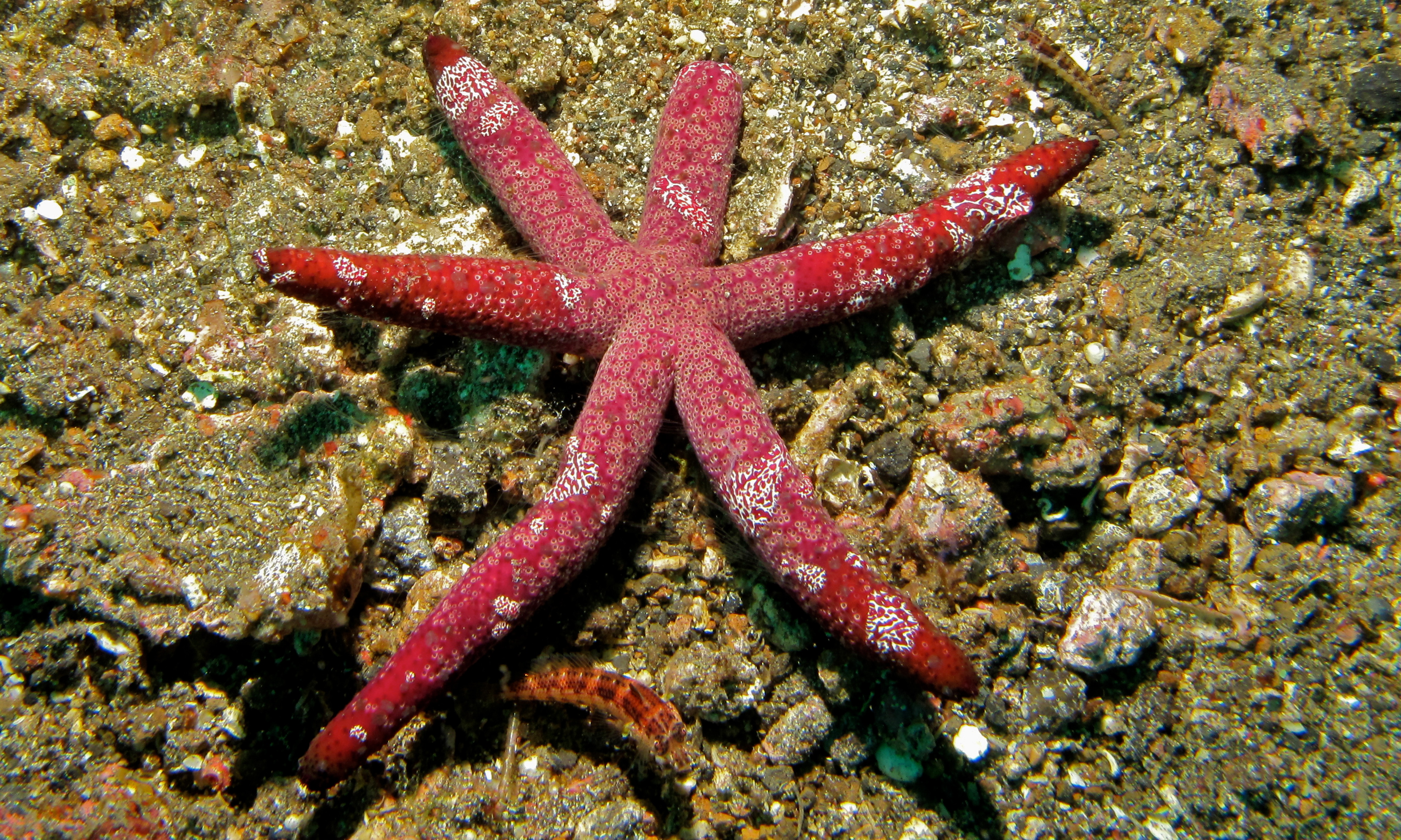
Echinaster luzonicus

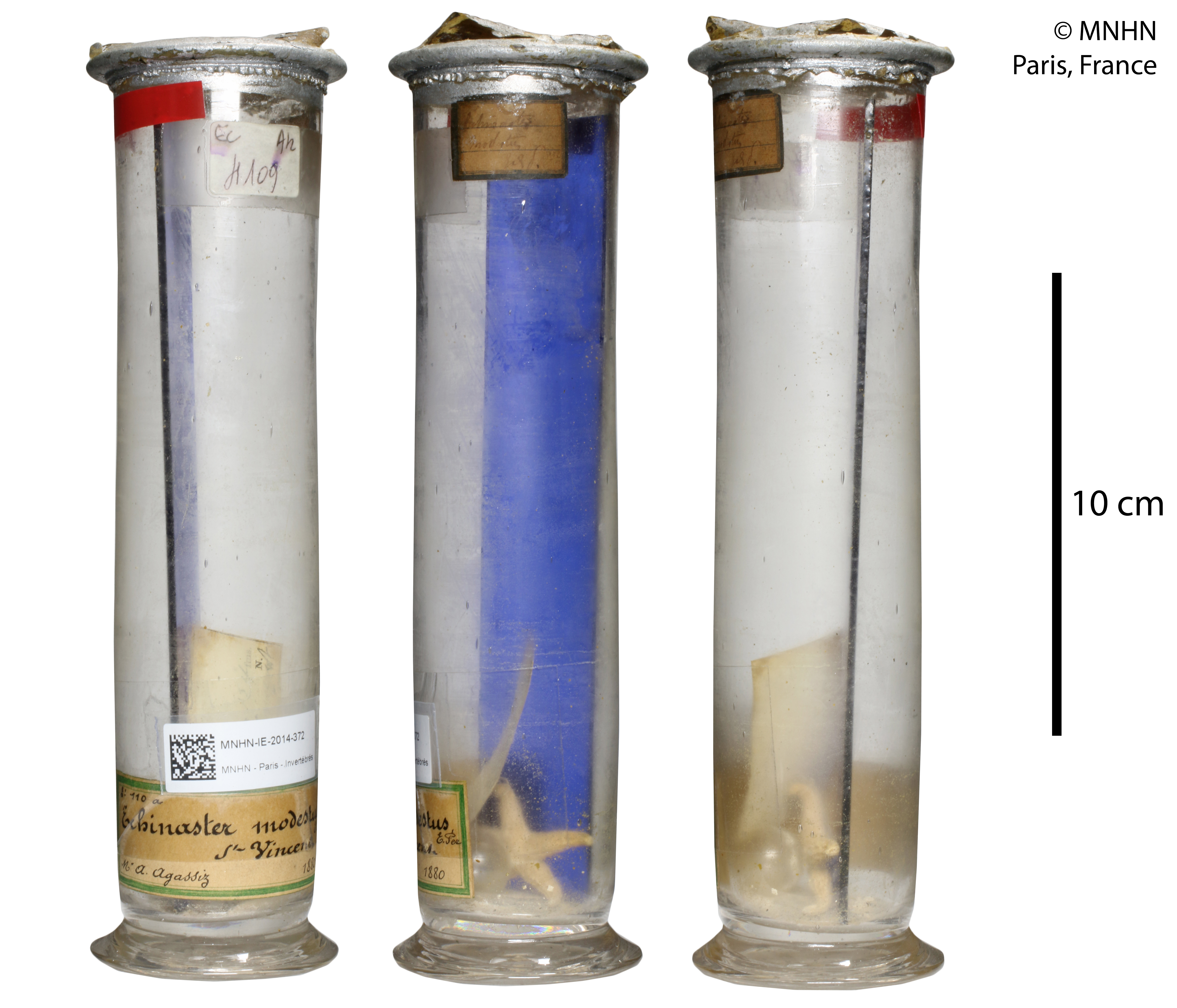
Echinaster modestus

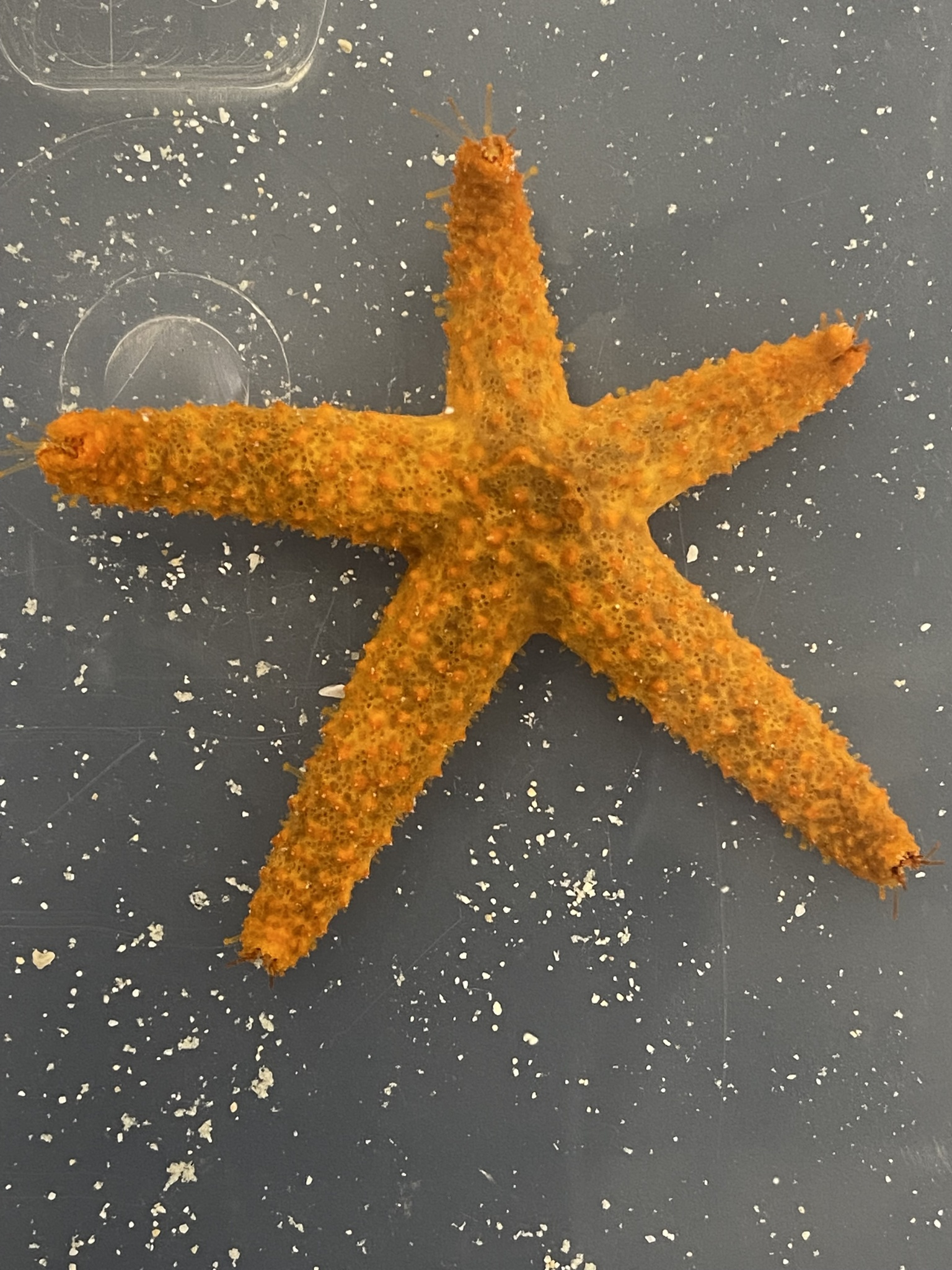
Echinaster paucispinus

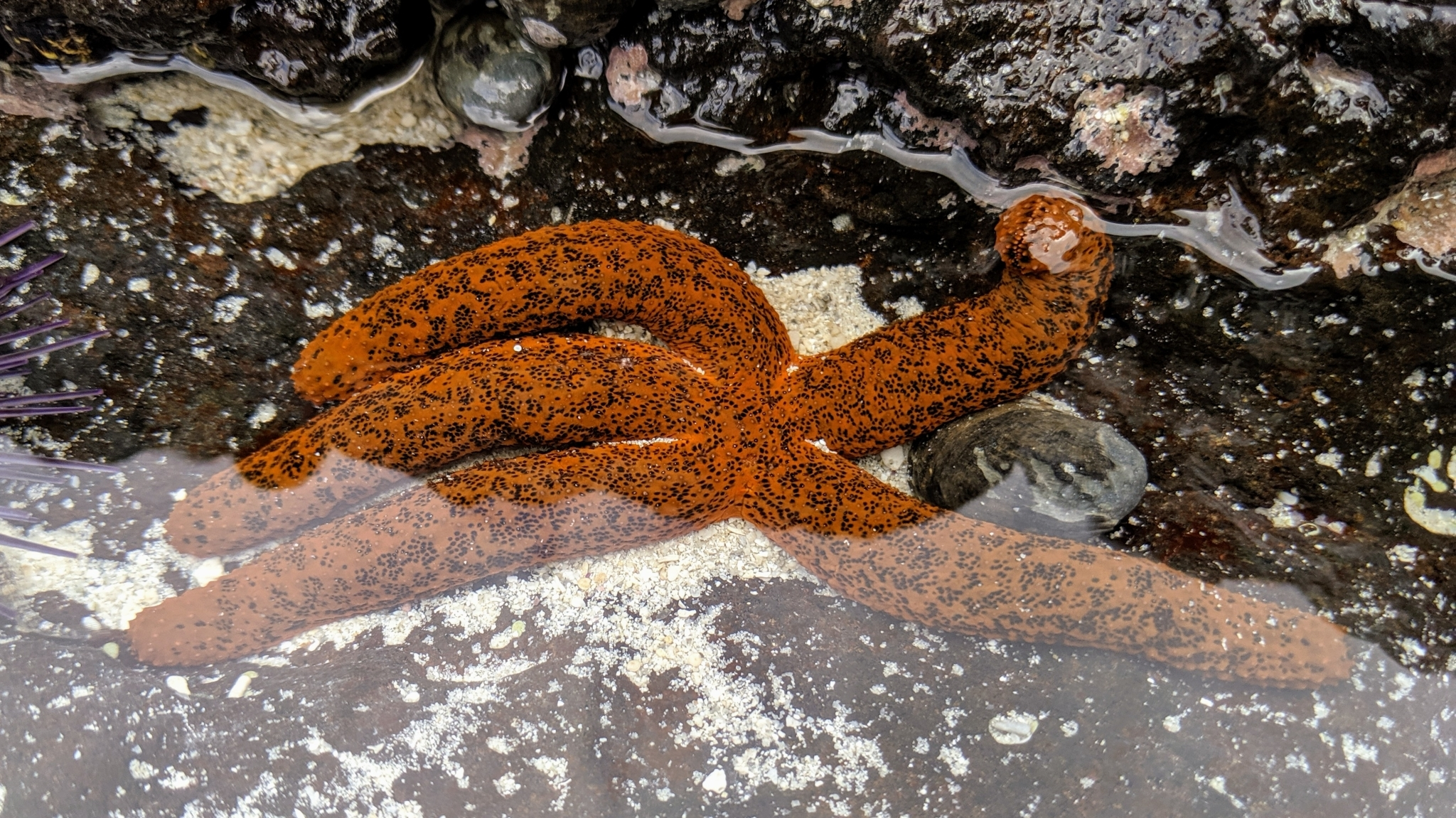
Echinaster purpureus

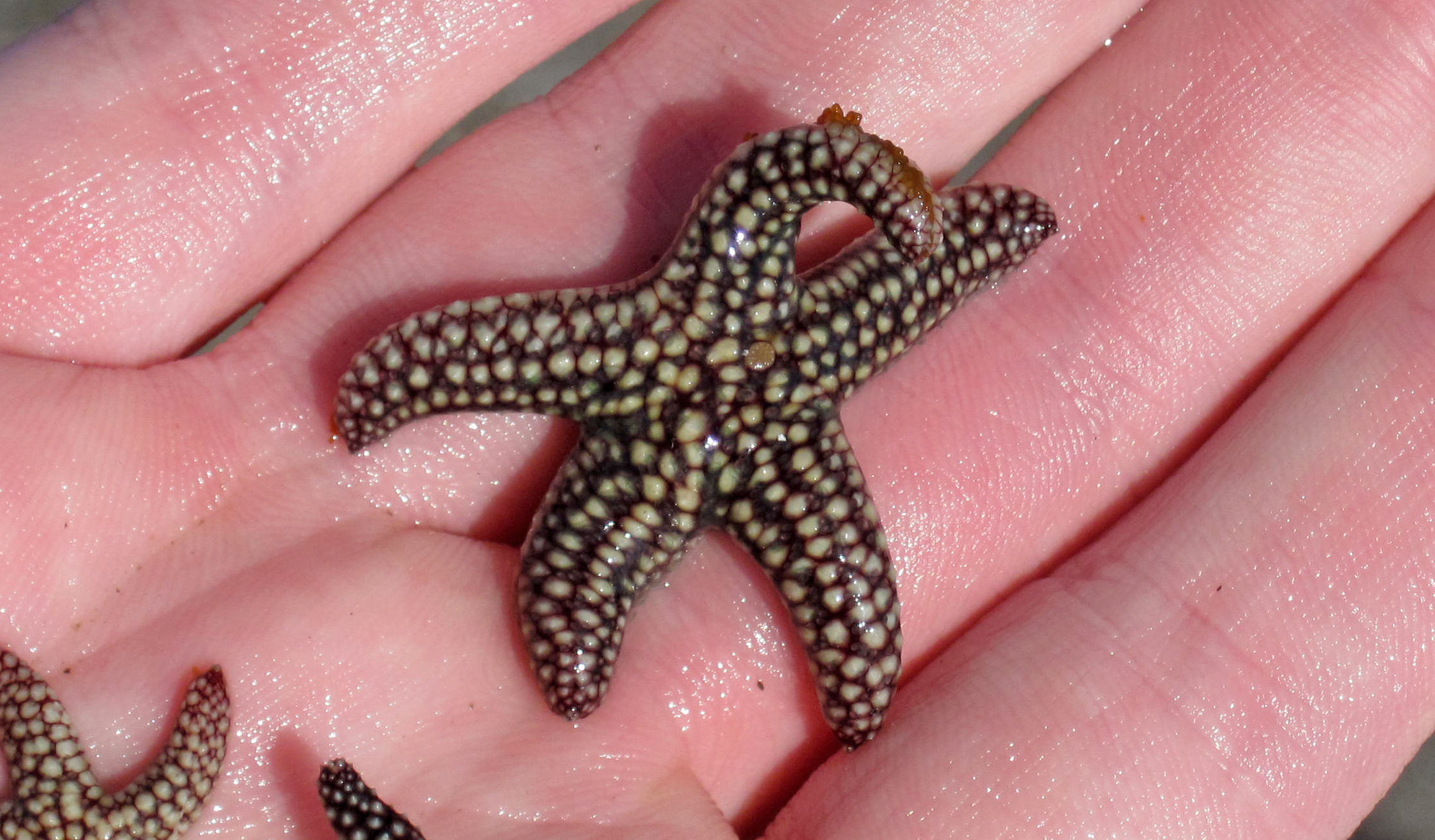
Echinaster sentus

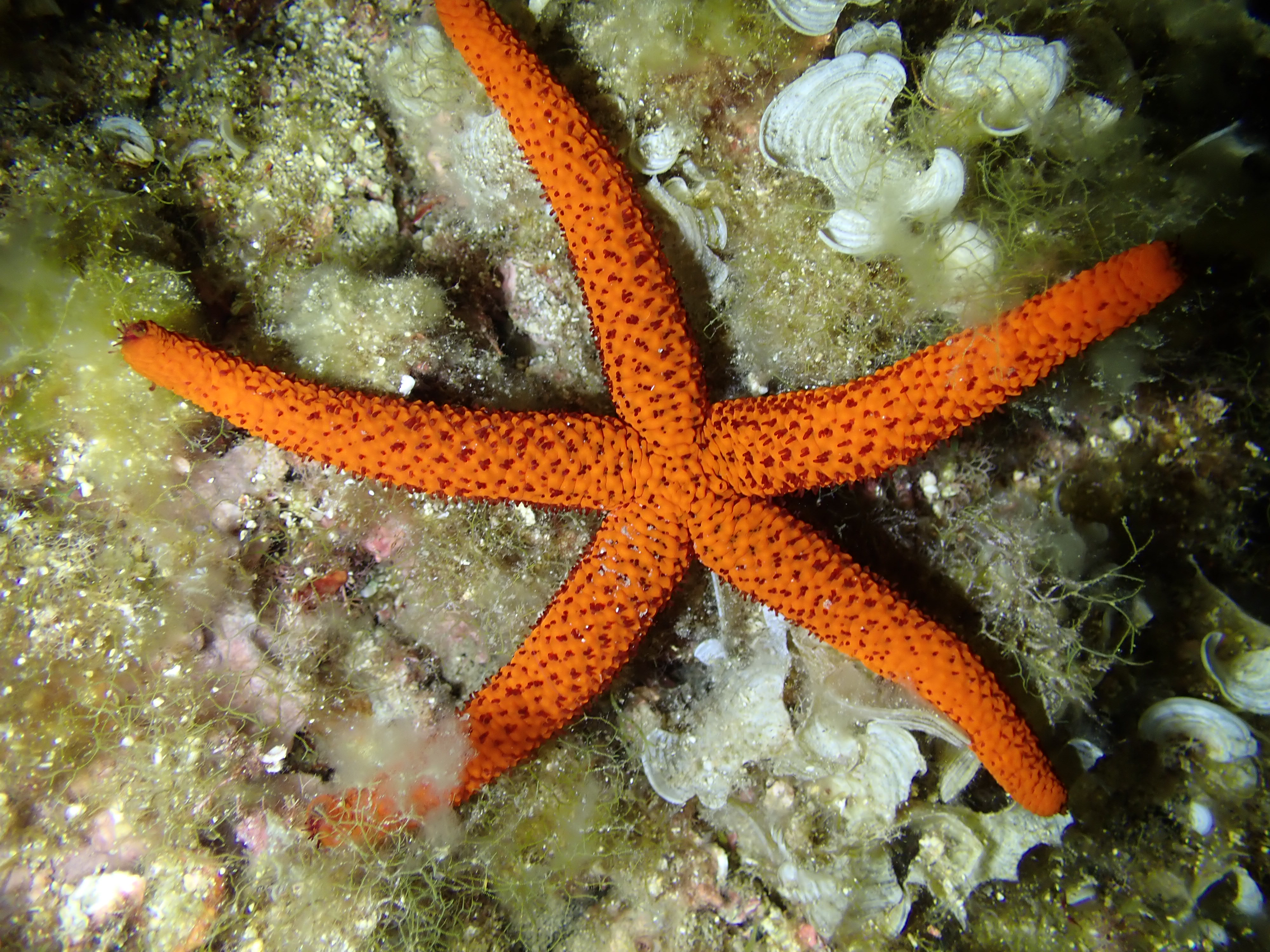
Echinaster sepositus

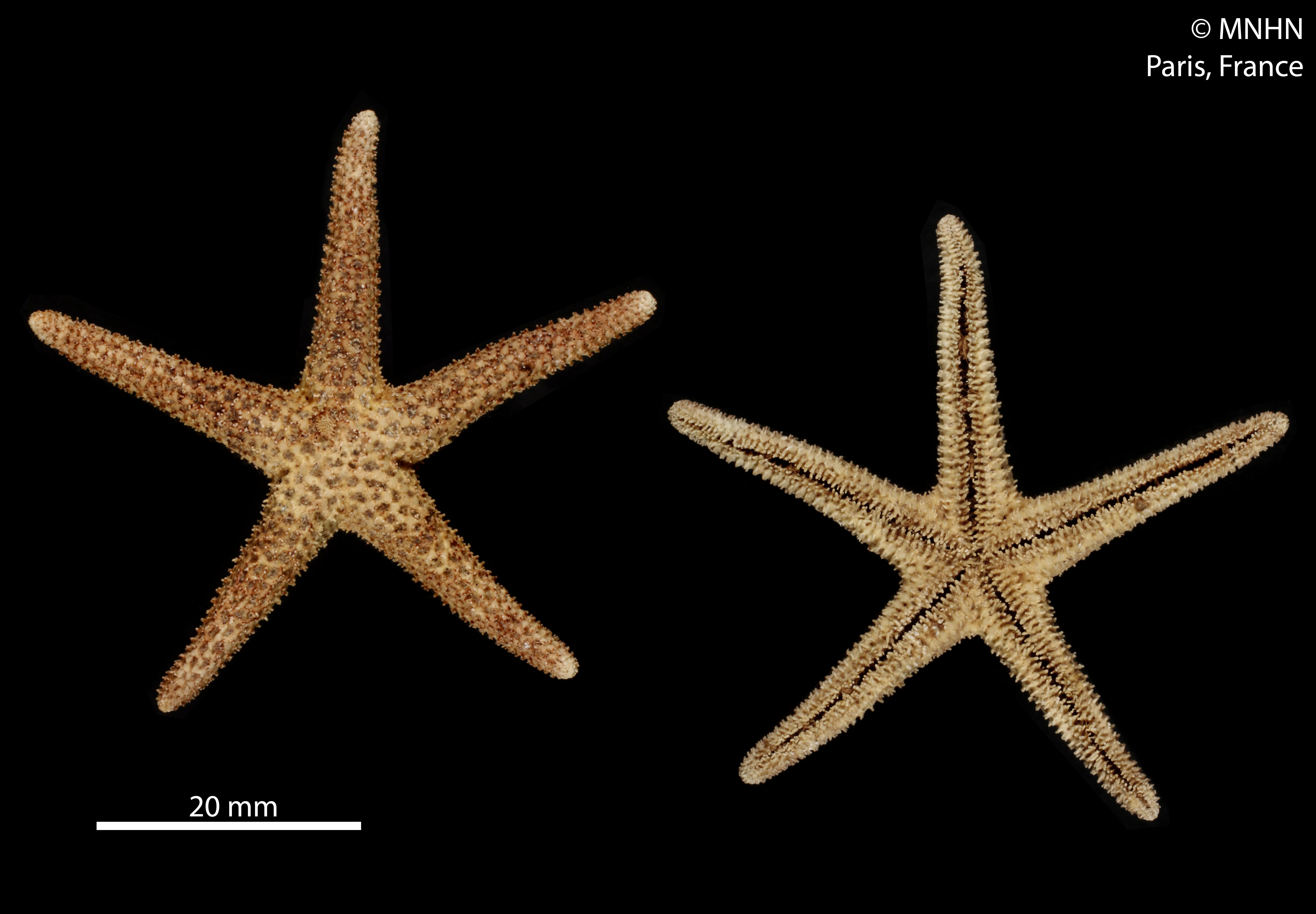
Echinaster serpentarius

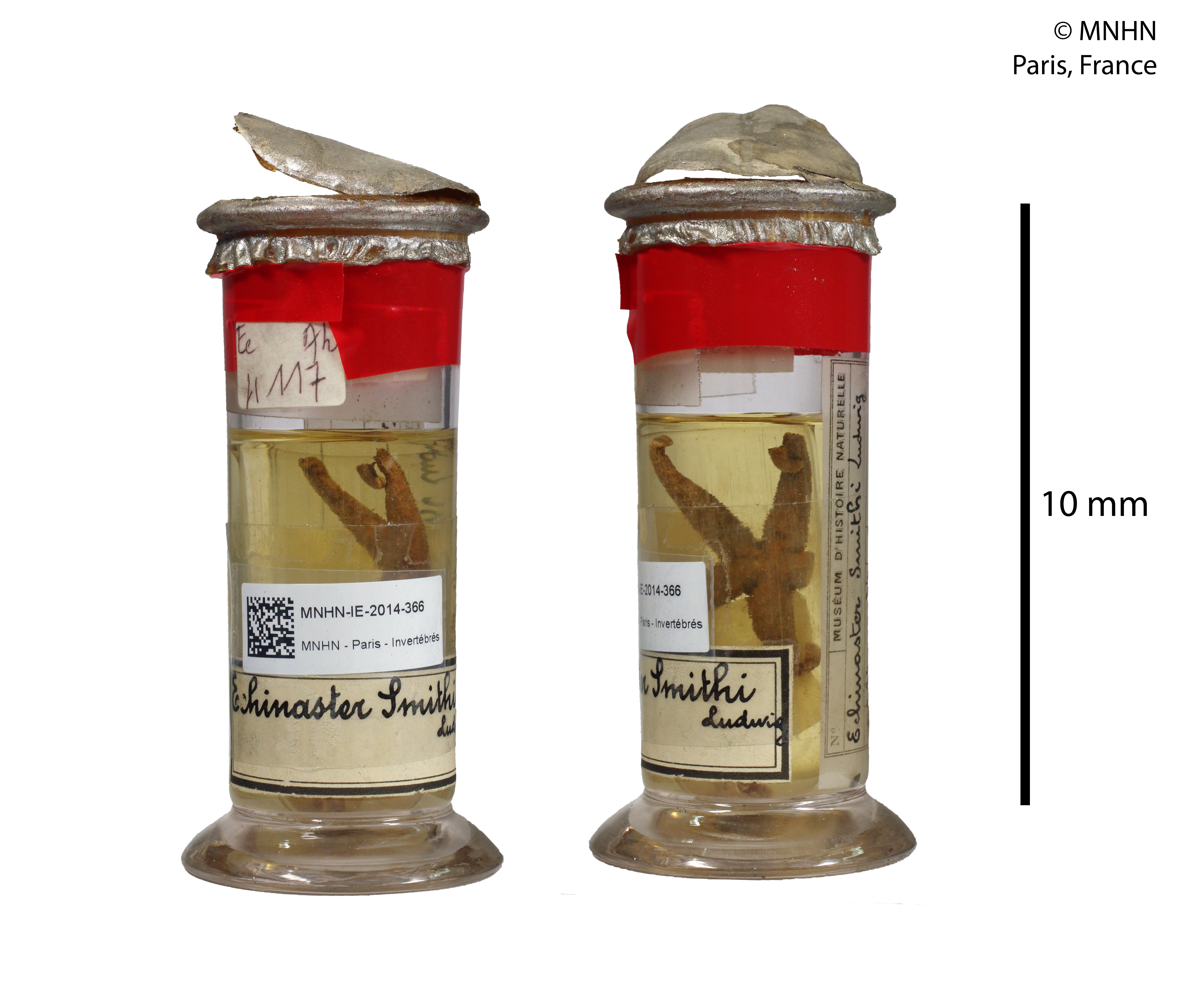
Echinaster smithi

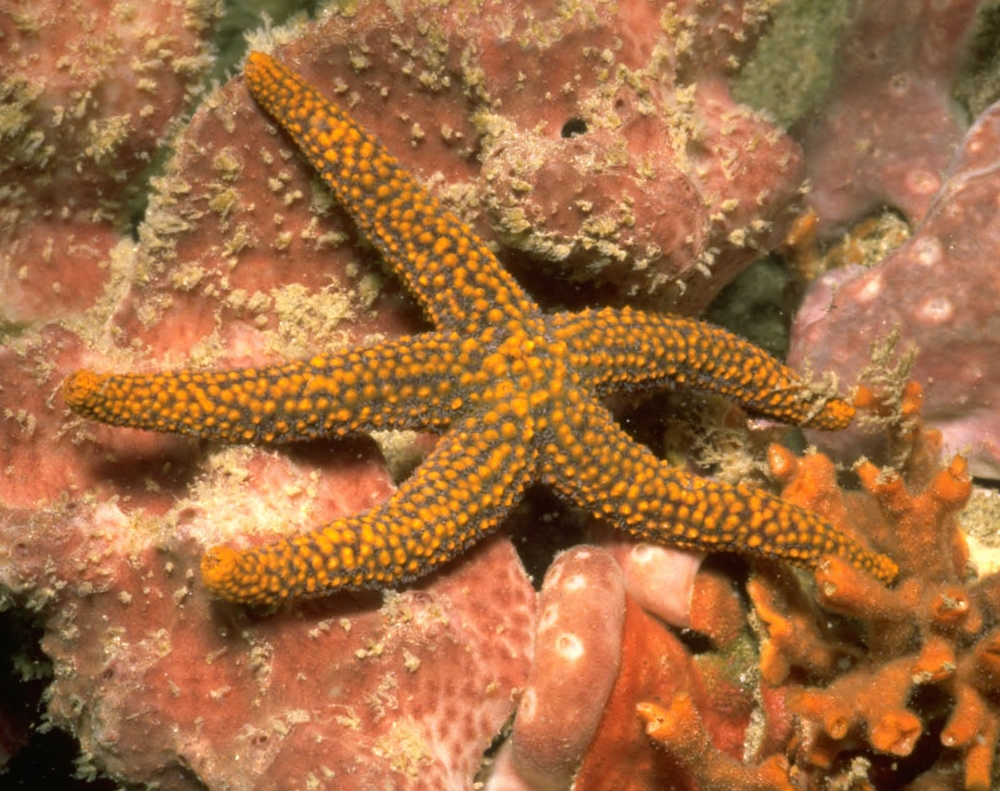
Echinaster spinulosus

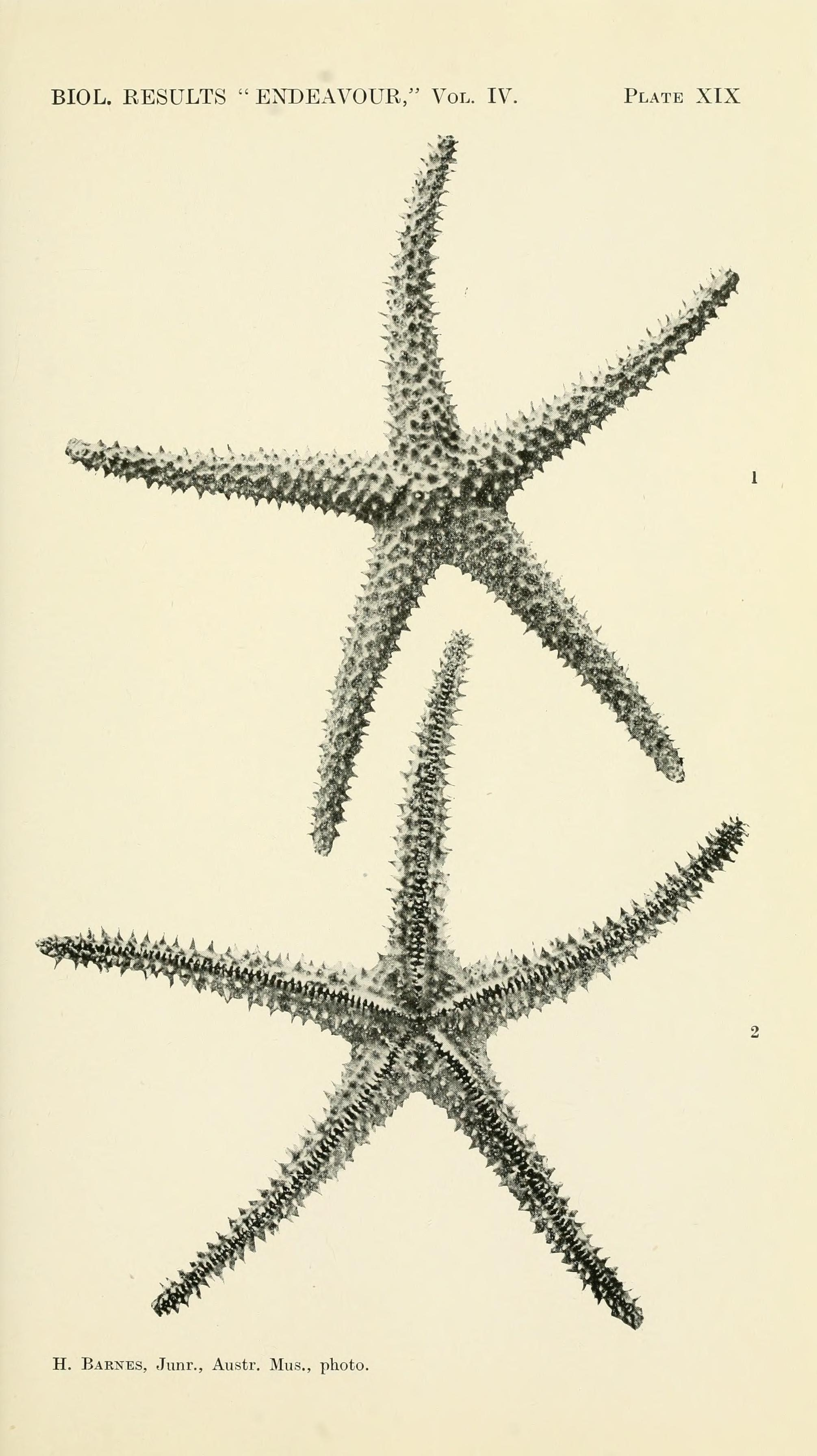
Echinaster stereosomus

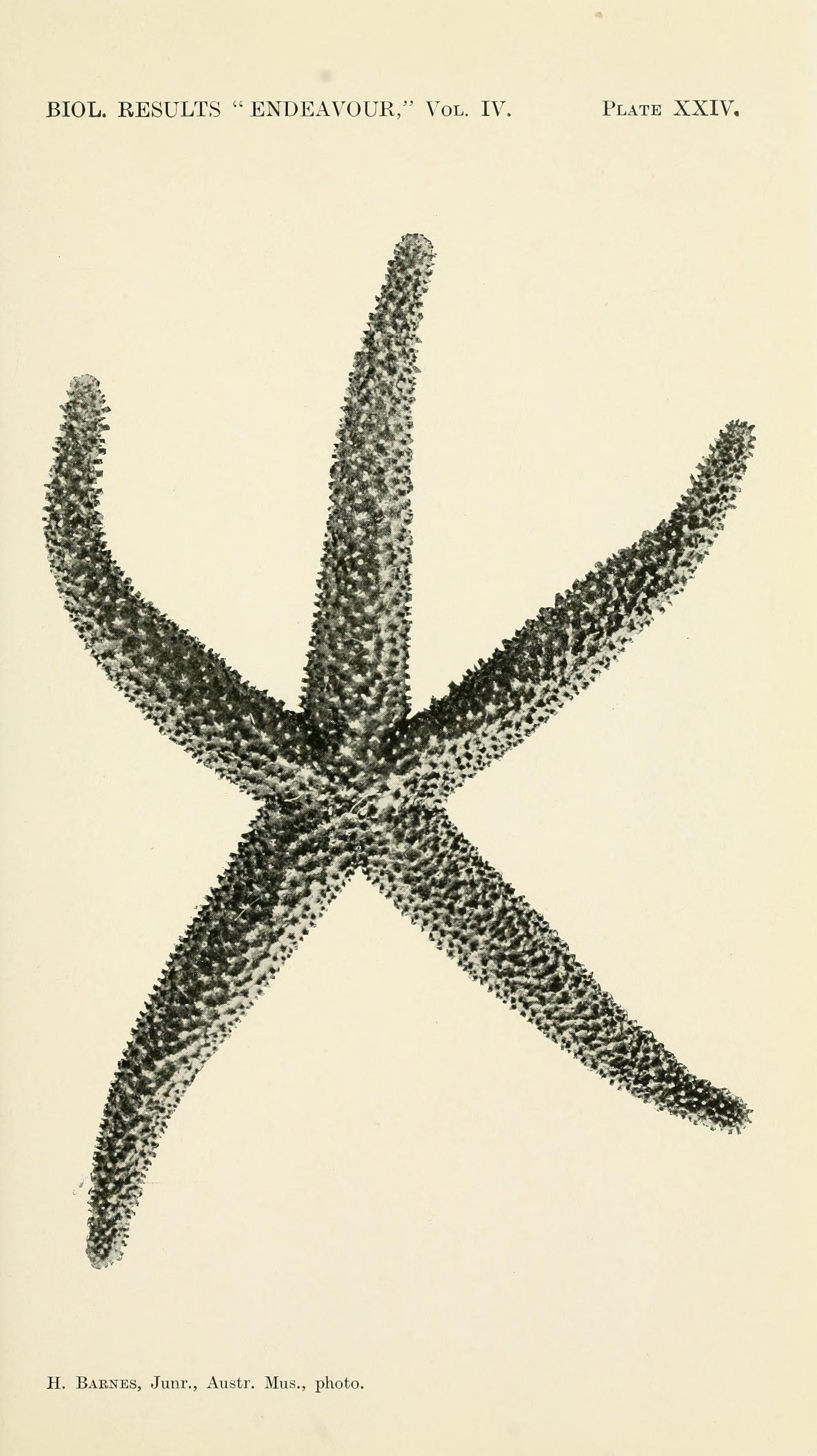
Echinaster superbus

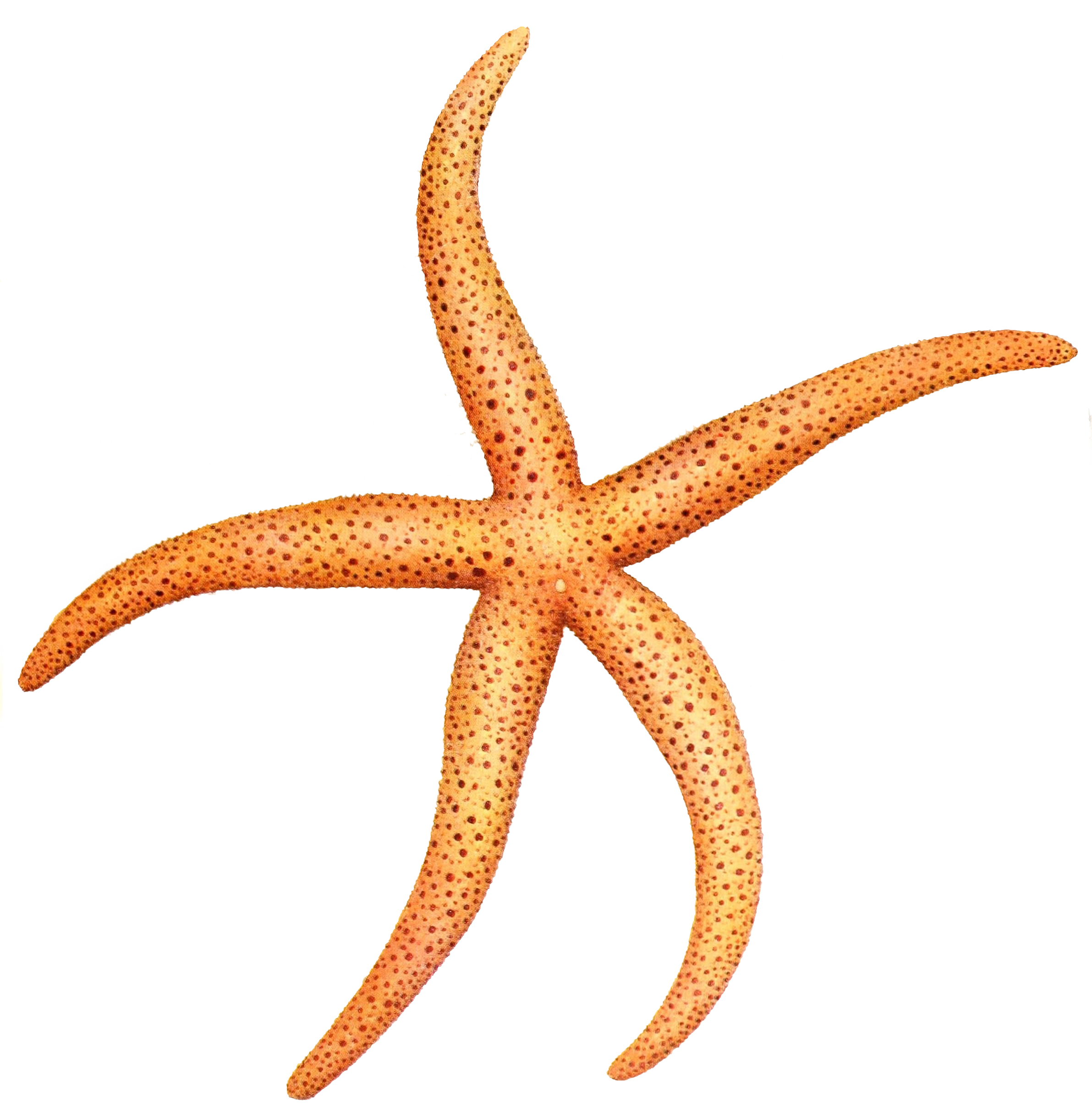
Echinaster varicolor

== Life history ==
=== Lifespan ===
Sea stars can live up to 35 years in the wild under the proper conditions, but the lifespans of Echinaster can be variable and affected by environmental factors such as salinity, temperature of water, light availability, and pollution. Furthermore, the lifespan of an Echinaster can also be affected by humans. Habitat destruction and overfishing are two factors which have adverse affects on populations of Echinaster.

=== Life cycle ===
Echinaster are able to start reproduction by broadcast spawning gametes into the water, where externally fertilized eggs develop into planktonic larvae. Most species only produce brachiolaria larvae which are lecithotropic, non-feeding larvae. However, some Echinaster produce larvae which first go through a smaller, feeding bipinnaria stage, and then through the second brachiolaria larval stage. Their eggs vary in size depending on parental investment, the amount of nutrients found in eggs, and the surrounding habitat. Sea stars are deuterostomes and the first cleavage begins shortly after fertilization and is holoblastic. Fourteen hours after fertilization, a wrinkled blastula is formed. Twenty hours after fertilization, a blastula with an invaginated pore at the vegetal pole forms. The blastula then rotates around an axis in circular motions, the embryos then undergo a longitudinal stretching. Cilia begin to surround the entire body causing movement along the anterior-posterior axis. Six days after fertilization occurs, the anterior body extends, while the posterior body flattens laterally. Shortly after, tube feet and the central disk begin to appear on the body. The mouth and spine begin to form on the body and after fifteen days, symmetry is more pronounced and the eyespot has fully developed. 60 days after fertilization occurred the sea stars can evert their stomach, their mouths become active, and they begin to feed on algae. The madreporite develops after 88 days and the hydropore develops on one of the primary plates. The first 40 days of Echinaster's development are distinguished by pronounced growth, after 40 days this growth begins to slow down significantly.

== Anatomy ==
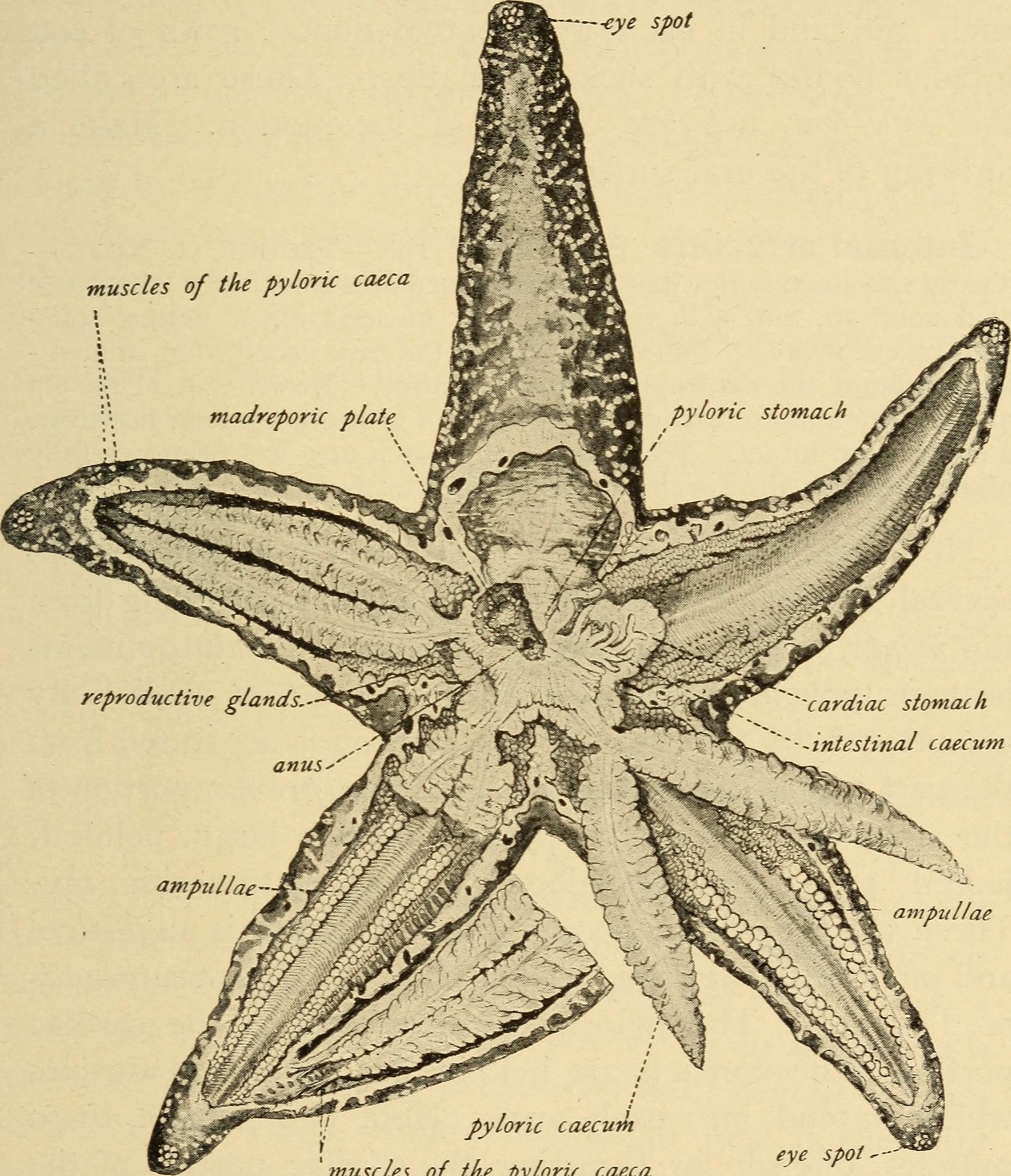
Starfish Anatomy.

Echinaster generally possess elongated arms attached to a narrow, central disk. They have body wall plates which appear similar to one another and form a meshed support network.^{[2]} These plates contain spinelets, which vary from thorny to cylindrical. The body cavity is composed of three major components: the perivisceral coelom which mainly surrounds the digestive system and the gonads; the perihaemal system, which consists of radial channels and forms a reduced circulatory system; and the water vascular system, which involves hundreds of tube feet, water channels, and the madreporite. Tube feet are involved in processes such as locomotion, adhesion, food collecting and excretion. The madreporite is a small calcified pore that is the location for drawing in and expelling water to fill the water vascular system. The digestive tract contains two stomachs, a large cardiac portion and a smaller pyloric portion. Each digestive gland in the body of Echinaster is connected to the pyloric stomach by the Tiedmann's pouch. Each pouch divides into a series of channels which are lined with cilia and act as a pumping organ for the sea star. In the floor of the Tiedmann's pouch lies the epidermal nerve plexus and the associated spindle nerve cells.

At the end of each arm, the sea star has an optic cushion and ocelli. Echinaster nervous system consists of the ectoneural and the hyponeural systems. Each arm is connected to the circumoral ring and contains a radial nerve cord. The ectoneural system forms two plexus within the body, one epidermal plexus which innervates the body wall and its appendages, and one plexus which innervates the epithelia of each organ.

=== Arm regeneration ===
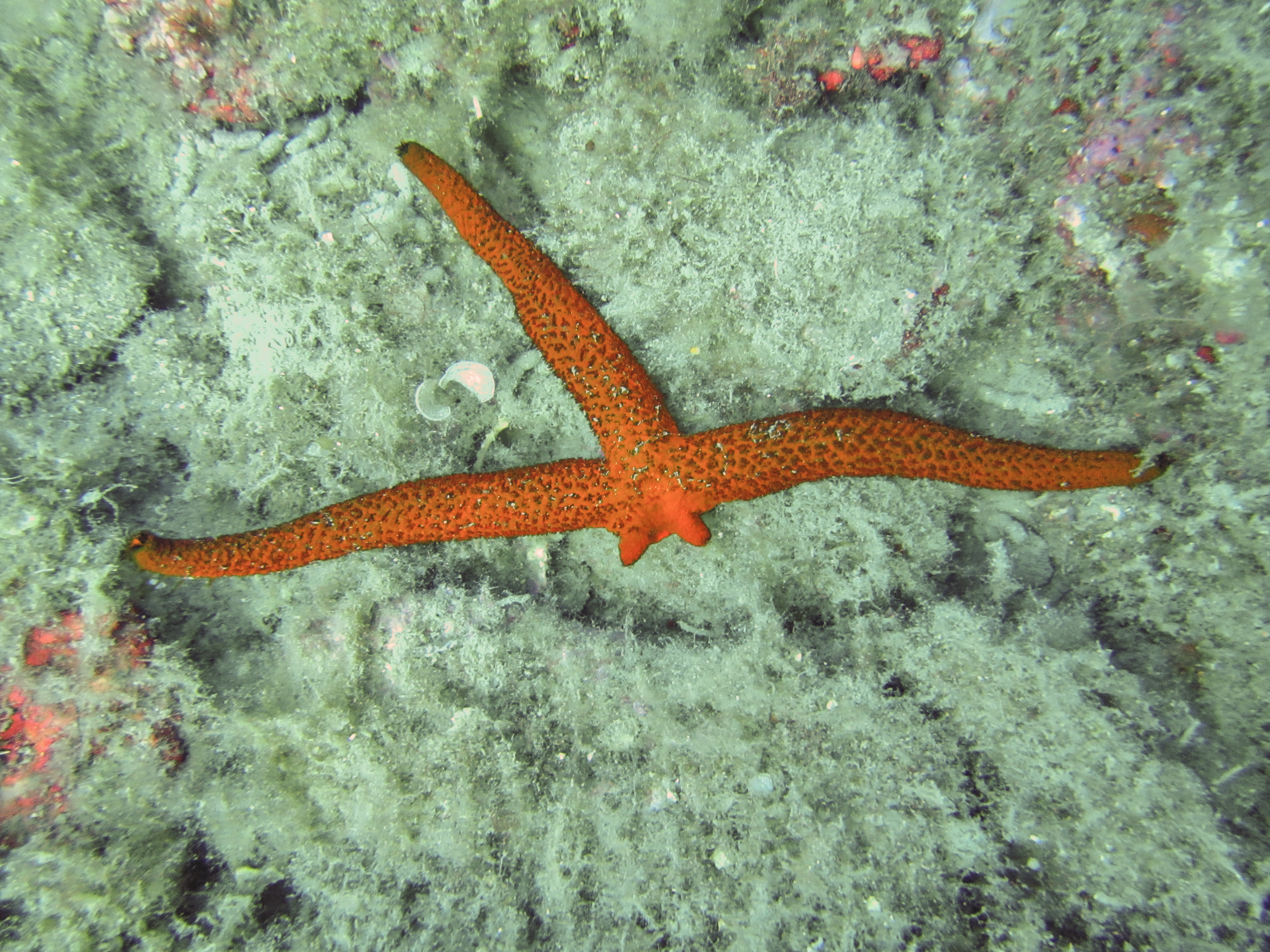
Echinaster sepositus regeneration

Echinaster can suffer frequent damage to their arms, so it is important they are capable of quick repair. When any part of the arm becomes damaged, the stump of the arm constricts, causing the coelom to seal. The combination of coelomic fluid migrating to the wound site and arm constriction, clots formed and the stump begins to seal, closing any open sites. Papullae appear to deflate and the dense connective tissue becomes more densely packed. Circular muscle fibers contract in the arm causing the tube feet to pull towards the wound. Twenty-four hours into arm regeneration, the body wall of the arm is still contracted and the aboral side of the arm has folded to the oral side. A thin epithelial layer has begun to form and the stump has begun to reform due to dedifferentiated epidermal cells. At this stage, the radial nerve cell has also begun to heal. 72 hours into arm regeneration, the aboral arm wall is still covering the wound site, however, now the body wall has relaxed and the papullae began to inflate again. A new epidermis has formed and is now thicker and stronger than the previous epidermis. Directly beneath the epidermis of the wound, phagocytes can be observed ingesting any bacteria or extra cells which are not necessary for regeneration. Morula cells are also present; these cells focus on wound healing and repairing the extracellular matrix. When the arm is completely repaired, myocytes can be ingested by phagocytes, used a direct source for new cells, or used as a source of energy. Stem cells may also contribute to regeneration in sea stars but little is known about their contributions in the Echinodermata. Altogether, arm regeneration takes a couple of weeks for members of the Echinaster genus, however, the arm begins to repair itself in as few as 3 days.

=== Locomotion ===
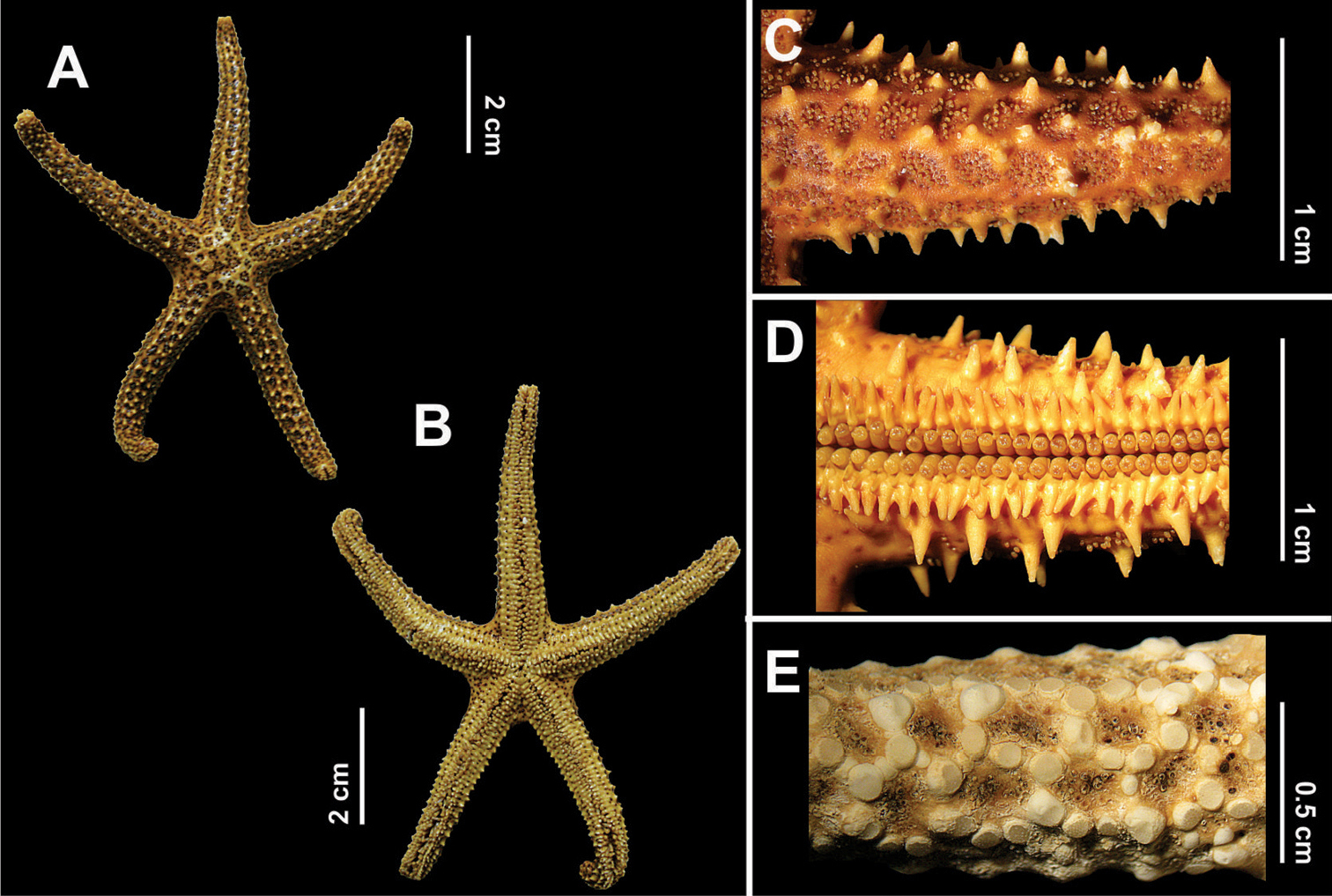
Echinaster brasiliensis: A-Spines of arm, B-Tube feet, C-Abactinal view of Arm.

Starfish generally move by using their tube feet. Water enters through the madreporite and reaches the tube feet, causing an expansion and contraction of the tube feet, which moves the sea star. When fully inverted, Echinaster and other sea stars are able to exhibit a behavior known as righting. This response is the ability to adjust tube feet to their proper orientation after a full body inversion. It can be useful if an organism gets caught in a storm surge or is dislodged by a predator, and also serves as a marker to assess their functional status when exposed to environmental changes. As the temperature increases, tube feet can lose their ability to adhere to surfaces. Studies show this is because the neuromuscular system does not adjust to thermal changes well. This directly affects the Echinaster's ability to right, causing their response to be slower and less efficient. When faced with thermal stress, Echinaster were found to right by somersaulting, this is where two adjacent arms twist, with the oral sides facing each other, and touch the substrate to become the sea star's lead arms. Another arm opposite the lead arms then touches the substrate. After this, the lead arms move towards the center of the organism and begin to move under the animal. Finally, the final arm releases the substrate and the free arms flip over the sea star resulting in a somersault motion. Furthermore, not only did a thermal increase result in a change in righting response, it also increased mortality rate in Echinaster and slowed metabolic response rates overall.

== Ecology ==
=== Habitat ===
Sea stars of the Echinaster genus are typically found in tropical and temperate waters at the bottom of the sea floor in shallow waters and in rocky shores across the globe. Most of the genus Echinaster can be found within the Caribbean and Mediterranean Seas, Pacific Ocean, Atlantic Ocean, and Indian Ocean. Evidence suggests that some species of these sea stars may linger around mangroves and reefs to prey upon the sponges which populate these areas.

=== Diet ===
Echinaster feed mostly on biofilms, encrusting invertebrates, such as sponges, and microalgae. One study performed showed that sea stars of the Echinaster have no problem eating the spicules of sponges, along with the sponge skeleton. Studies also showed that the Echinaster prefer sponge species that lack chemical defenses.^{[18]} They are the least likely to eat sponges with a rubbery texture.

This genera typically associates themselves with their prey in the same area, if not found in a feeding position, their stomachs are typically found partially-everted. When Echinaster settle in feeding positions, their stomachs tend to evert into a button-like structure. Echinaster are able to receive nutrients through external digestive activity or they can acquire nutrients through detritus.

== Research ==
Several species of Echinaster have been studied for potential medical application. One example of this is the Echinaster echinophorus which has been studied for its methanolic extract. The phytochemical analysis showed secondary metabolites including saponins, phenols, tannins, alkaloids, steroids, amino acids and quinones. The extract was tested against mice who were infected with the parasite Leishmania amazonensis, which is known to cause diseases such as leishmaniasis. The study showed that the extract worked against two forms of the parasite and scored a nine on the selectivity index, which indicates the extract is selective against the parasite. The extract reduced the size of lesions, and the amount of parasites without affecting the mice, however it did not cure the mice completely of the parasite. With further studies, this extract could prove to be an effective medicine against leishmaniasis.

Another species within the genera, Echinaster brasiliensis, has been studied to examine the biochemical bases of circadian rhythms, and produces endogenous melatonin in their gonads. This study found that organisms kept in a natural light and dark cycle, where sunrise occurred at 0625 hours and sunset at 1745 hours (6:25 am, 5:45 pm) produced a low concentration of melatonin. There was an increase in melatonin production when sunset was changed to 1700 hours (5 pm) and this was said to last throughout the night. As a control, some organisms were left completely in the dark, these organisms produced about the same amount of melatonin as the natural light organisms. This study demonstrates that there is a nocturnal peak production of melatonin in E. brasiliensis and that melatonin is the result of a biological clock, not light, though it can be a stimulus.
