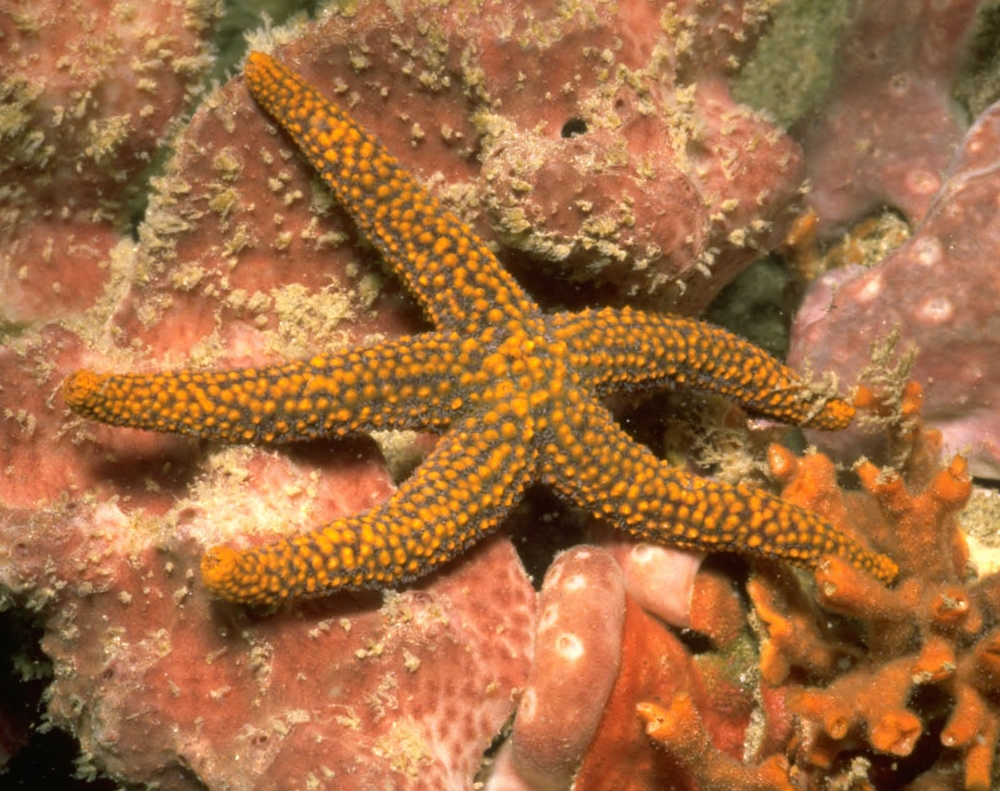

Scientific classification
- Kingdom: Animalia
- Phylum: Echinodermata
- Class: Asteroidea
- Order: Spinulosida
- Family: Echinasteridae
- Genus: Echinaster
- Species: E. spinulosus

Binomial name
- Echinaster spinulosus Verrill, 1869

Synonyms
- Echinaster (Othilia) modestus Downey, 1973); Echinaster modestus Downey, 1973; Verrillaster spinulosus Downey, 1973

= Echinaster spinulosus =

Species of starfish

Echinaster spinulosus, the small spine sea star, is a species of sea star found in shallow parts of the western Atlantic Ocean, the Caribbean Sea and Gulf of Mexico.

== Description ==
Echinaster spinulosus is a medium-sized sea star with five long tapering arms, round in cross section, attached to a central disc. Near one edge of this is the madreporite, a structure used for drawing in water to replenishing the water vascular system. The aboral or upper surface is covered in flat plates, each of which bears several short, blunt spines. These plates are quite prominent. They have fine granulations and are arranged in fifteen to twenty irregular rows that continue down the arms. On the margin of the arms are a row of plates with flattened spines and on the oral (under) surface, on either side of the ambulacral grooves, are larger plates, each bearing one small and two larger spines. In the grooves there are several rows of bright orange tube feet with suckers. The tips of the arms bear tiny orange eye spots and are often turned upwards. This sea star grows to about 6 inches (150 mm) in diameter and its general colour is maroon or brown flecked with white. The body wall of the disc and arms is composed of collagen fibres arranged in a three-dimensional web with calcareous plates in between. This arrangement provides a protective surface with flexibility when the sea star moves around and rigidity when required.

== Distribution and habitat ==
Echinaster spinulosus is found in the western Atlantic from Cape Hatteras and the Gulf Coast southwards to Venezuela, the Caribbean Sea and the Gulf of Mexico. Its typical habitats include sandy bottoms, seagrass meadows (Zostera spp.), oyster beds, stony flats and pilings. It is a common species and is found at depths between 10 and 20 metres (33 and 66 ft).

== Biology ==
Echinaster spinulosus is a predator and scavenger and feeds on such sessile invertebrates as sponges and tunicates.
