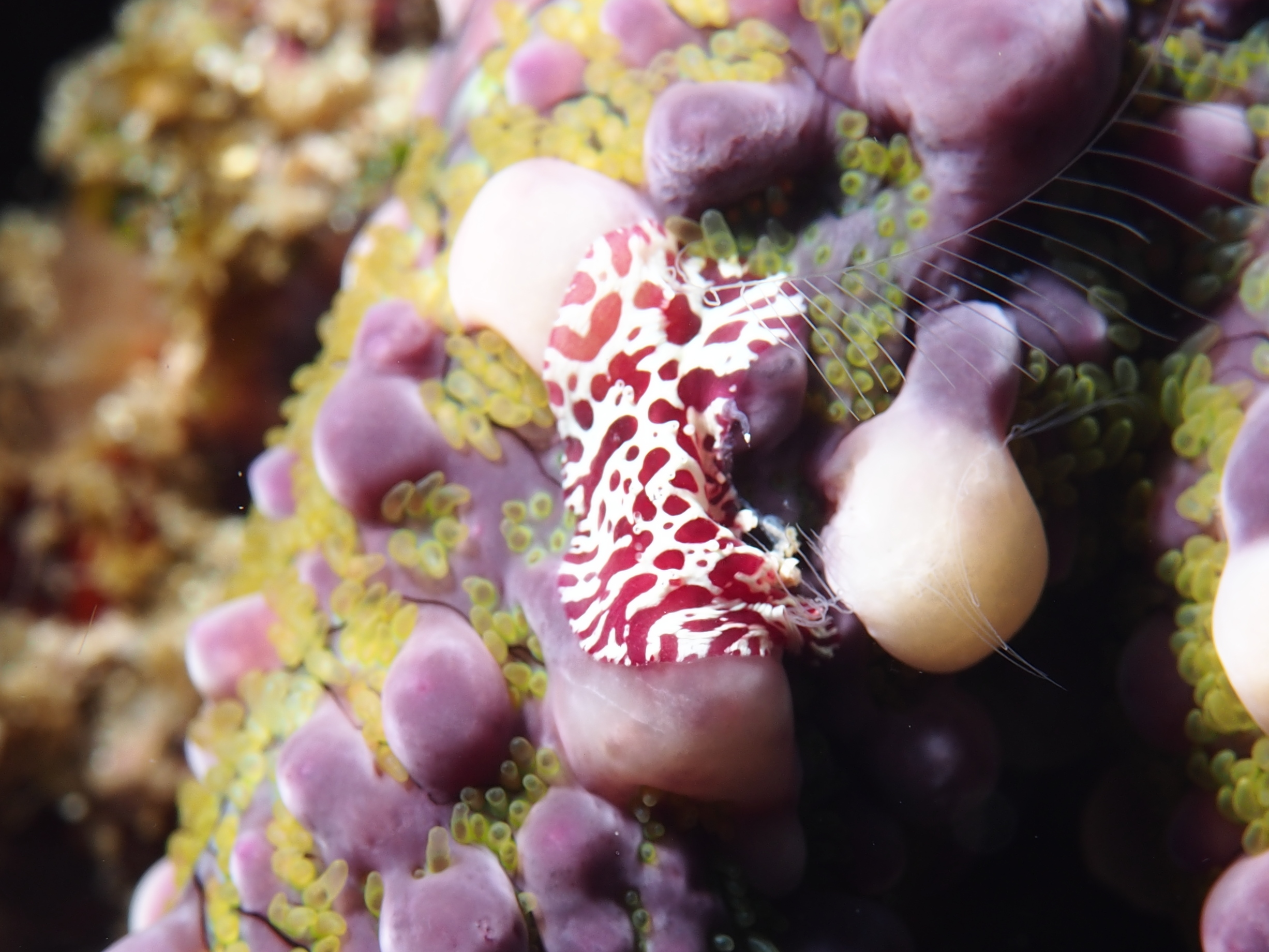
- Coeloplana astericola showing streaming tentacles studded with tentilla.

Scientific classification
- Domain: Eukaryota
- Kingdom: Animalia
- Phylum: Ctenophora
- Class: Tentaculata
- Order: Platyctenida
- Family: Coeloplanidae
- Genus: Coeloplana
- Species: C. astericola

Binomial name
- Coeloplana astericola Mortensen, 1927

= Coeloplana astericola =

Species of comb jelly

Coeloplana astericola, the creeping comb jelly, is a species of benthic comb jelly from the tropical western Indo-Pacific region that lives as an episymbiont on starfish such as Echinaster luzonicus.

== Description ==
Platyctenids are unlike most other comb jellies in being bottom dwellers. They resemble flatworms in general appearance, being flattened dorso-ventrally and roughly oval in shape. The comb rows bearing bands of cilia, typical of comb jellies, are absent, but one end of the animal bears a pair of well-developed, retractable tentacles that can be extended for feeding. The underside of the comb jelly is a "creeping sole", formed from the everted lining of the pharynx, and on this it can move over the surface of the starfish. It has irregular red and white markings.

== Ecology ==
This comb jelly lives symbiotically on the aboral (upper) surface of starfish such as the banded bubble star, Echinaster callosus, and the Luzon sea star, Echinaster luzonicus, although it is unclear precisely how each of the parties benefit from the arrangement.

Like other comb jellies, Coeloplana astericola has an extendible tentacular system composed of a pair of tentacles each bearing numerous tentilla on their ventral surfaces. To feed, the tentacles stream out with the current, sensory cilia are stimulated by swimming planktonic organisms, the tentilla extend in that direction and trap the prey.

Most comb jellies are hermaphrodites; self fertilisation can occur but cross fertilisation is more common. The embryos are retained in specialist brood-sacs at first, before being released as planktonic larvae. Other members of this genus settle on corals, but this species settles on starfish.
