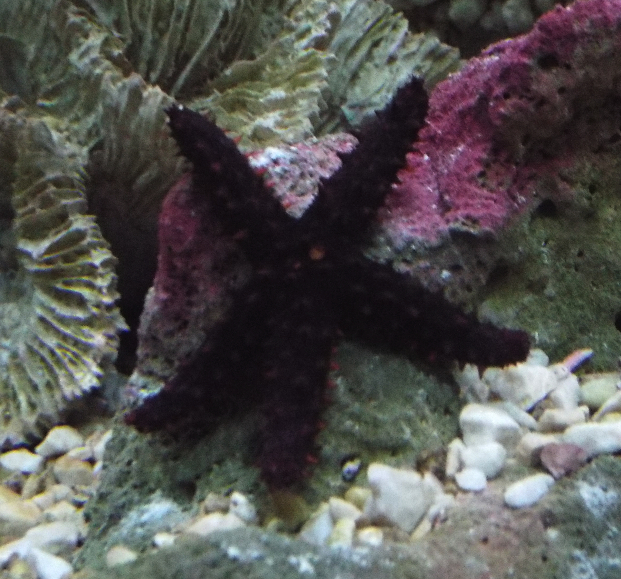

Conservation status
- Vulnerable (NatureServe)

Scientific classification
- Kingdom: Animalia
- Phylum: Echinodermata
- Class: Asteroidea
- Order: Spinulosida
- Family: Echinasteridae
- Genus: Echinaster
- Species: E. echinophorus

Binomial name
- Echinaster echinophorus (Lamarck, 1816)

Synonyms
- Asterias echinophora Lamarck, 1816; Asterias spinosa Retzius, 1805; Echinaster (Othilia) crassispina Verrill, 1868; Echinaster (Othilia) echinophorus Lamarck, 1816; Echinaster (Othilia) spinosus (Retzius, 1805); Stellonia spinosa Nardo, 1834

= Orange knobby star =

Species of starfish

The orange knobby star, Echinaster echinophorus, is a species of sea star found in the Caribbean Sea and along the Atlantic coast of South America.

== Description ==
It is a small species with a diameter of up to 7 cm (2.8 in). It has a small central disc and five spatulate arms, tapering very little and with rounded tips. The arms are oval in cross section and on the aboral (upper) side have one or two rows of bluntly conical spines, and more rows of spines on the sides of the arms and on the oral (under) surface, on either side of the ambulacral grooves. The colour is usually some shade of red or orange.

== Distribution and habitat ==
Echinaster echinophorus is found in shallow water in Florida, the Caribbean Sea, the Bahamas, Venezuela, and northern Brazil at depths ranging from 24 to 73 m (79 to 240 ft) and at a sea temperature of about 27 °C (8 °F). It occurs on reefs, rocks, and areas of coral rubble and sometimes among mangroves.

== Biology ==
In Florida, Echinaster echinophorus spawns in late spring and early summer. Two types of egg are produced, some being dark-coloured and planktonic while others are bright orange and immediately sink to the seabed. These soon start to develop into modified brachiolaria larvae, which have larval arms and attach with a sucker. By day seven they have two pairs of tube feet and begin to move around. The development of the pelagic eggs takes place much more slowly.

== Research ==
A study testing secondary metabolites obtained from Echinaster echinophorus found an extract from its tissues showed activity against Leishmania amazonensis, the protozoan parasite causing the tropical skin disease leishmaniasis, and it was not toxic to the mice on which it was tested.

Orange knobbly stars feed on many species of sponges, but the red tree sponge (Haliclona compressa) contains certain secondary metabolites that prevent the starfish from eating it.
