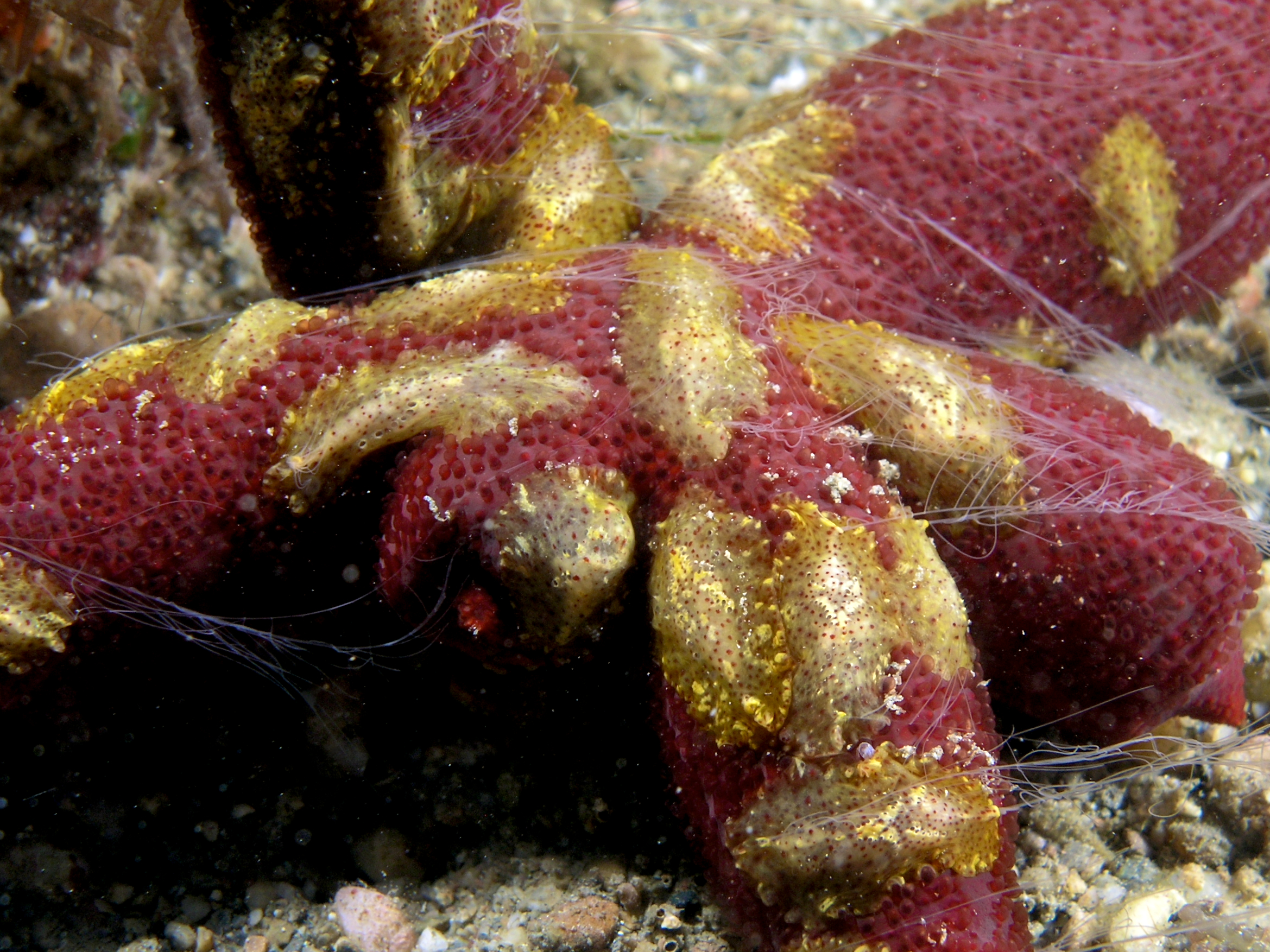
- Coeloplana astericola on Echinaster luzonicus

Scientific classification
- Kingdom: Animalia
- Phylum: Echinodermata
- Class: Asteroidea
- Order: Spinulosida
- Family: Echinasteridae
- Genus: Echinaster
- Species: E. luzonicus

Binomial name
- Echinaster luzonicus (Gray, 1840)

Synonyms
- Echinaster affinis Perrier, 1869; Echinaster eridanella Muller & Troschel, 1842; Echinaster multipapillatus Hoffman in Rowe, 1974; Henricia multipapillata (Hoffman, 1874); Othilia eridanella (Muller & Troschel, 1942); Othilia luzonica Gray, 1840

= Echinaster luzonicus =

Luzon sea star

Species of starfish

Echinaster luzonicus, the Luzon sea star, is a species of starfish in the family Echinasteridae, found in shallow parts of the western Indo-Pacific region. It sometimes lives symbiotically with a copepod or a comb jelly, and is prone to shed its arms, which then regenerate into new individuals.

== Description ==
Echinaster luzonicus is normally a six-armed starfish but is often rather asymmetrical in appearance because of its habit of shedding arms. It is somewhat variable in colouring, ranging from red to dark brown. Both these colour morphs were collected off Heron Island in the Great Barrier Reef, and individuals seemed able to change their colour from red to brown and back again, possibly as a response to the amount of ambient light they received.

== Distribution and habitat ==
Echinaster luzonicus is found in the tropical and sub-tropical western Indo-Pacific region. Its range extending from Madagascar and the east coast of Africa to Northern Australia, Indonesia and the Philippines. A common species, it is found on both reef crests and in the intertidal zone.

== Ecology ==
Echinaster luzonicus feeds on bacterial and algal films that it extracts from the sediment. This species is unique in its genus in that it reproduces asexually by autotomizing its arms; the shed arm then regenerates, growing a new disc and further arms. This species has not been recorded breeding in any other way.

A species of copepod, lives symbiotically on the oral (under) surface of Echinaster luzonicus; it is so cryptically coloured as to be almost indistinguishable from its host. Another associate of this starfish is the comb jelly, Coeloplana astericola, which grows in abundance on its aboral (upper) surface. Three symbionts recorded on E. luzonicus was the ectoparasitic snail Melanella martinii (A. Adams in Sowerby, 1854), followed by the pontoniine shrimp Zenopontonia soror (Nobili, 1904) and the polychaete scaleworm Asterophilia carlae Hanley, 1989 in the waters of a volcanic island.

== Research ==
A novel cyclic steroid glycoside has been isolated from the tissues of Echinaster luzonicus and has been named luzonicoside A. Four further cyclic glycosides containing carbohydrate fragments have since been named luzonicosides B to E; luzonicoside F, another glycoside, is an open carbohydrate chain steroid. These metabolites exhibit varying degrees of lysosomal activity.
