= Asteropsis =

Asteropsis may refer to:

- Asteropsis (echinoderm) Müller & Troschel, 1840, a genus of sea stars in the family Asteropseidae
- Asteropsis Perrier, 1875, a genus of sea stars in the family Asteropseidae; synonym of Petricia
- Asteropsis (plant), a genus in the family Asteraceae
