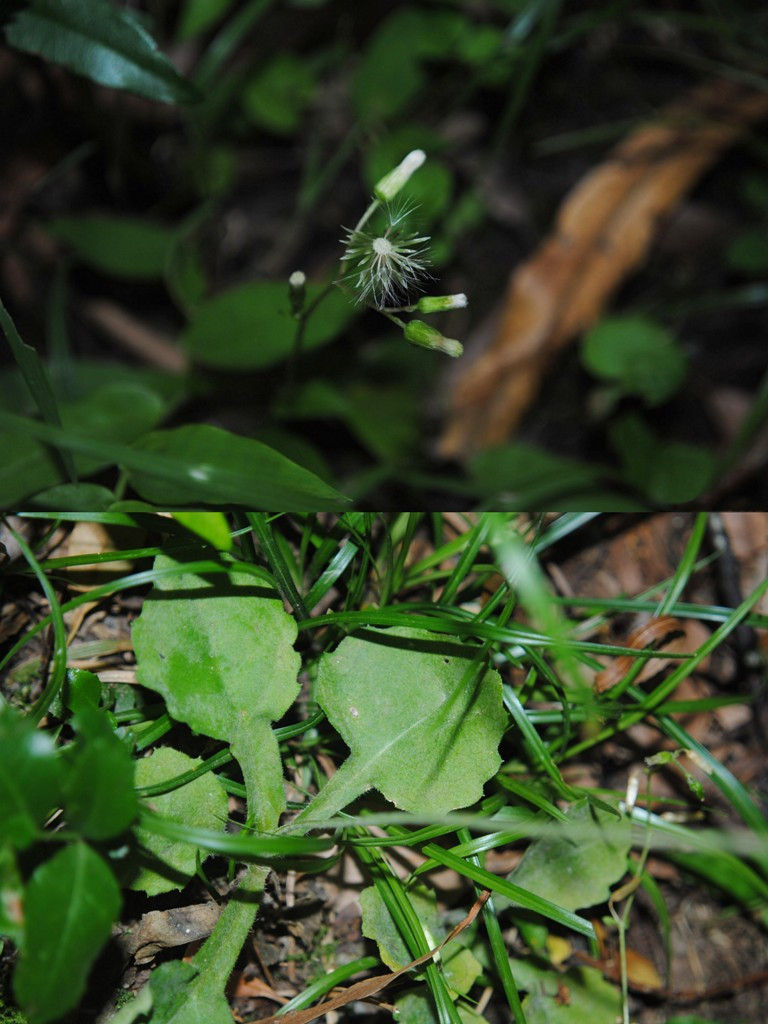
- Podocoma notobellidiastrum

Scientific classification
- Kingdom: Plantae
- Clade: Tracheophytes
- Clade: Angiosperms
- Clade: Eudicots
- Clade: Asterids
- Order: Asterales
- Family: Asteraceae
- Subfamily: Asteroideae
- Tribe: Astereae
- Subtribe: Baccharidinae
- Genus: Podocoma; Cass. 1817 not R.Br. 1849

Synonyms
- Asteropsis Less.; Podopappus Hook. & Arn.

= Podocoma =

Genus of plants

Podocoma is a genus of South American plants in the tribe Astereae within the family Asteraceae.

Species

- Podocoma bellidifolia Baker - Brazil, Argentina, Paraguay
- Podocoma blanchetiana Baker - Brazil, Argentina, Paraguay
- Podocoma hieracifolia (Poir.) Cass. - Bolivia, Brazil, Argentina, Paraguay, Uruguay
- Podocoma hirsuta (Hook. & Arn.) Baker - Brazil, Argentina, Paraguay, Uruguay
- Podocoma regnellii Baker - Paraná
- Podocoma spegazzinii Cabrera - Uruguay, Salta, Santa Catarina

formerly included

Transferred to other genera: Asteropsis, Exostigma, Ixiochlamys
