= Fernald brooding anemone =

Fernald brooding anemone may refer to two different species of sea anemone:

- Cribrinopsis fernaldi, found in the Pacific Ocean from the Gulf of Alaska to Washington state
- Epiactis fernaldi, found near the San Juan Islands off the western coast of North America
