= Epiactis fernaldi =

Scientific classification
- Kingdom: Animalia
- Phylum: Cnidaria
- Subphylum: Anthozoa
- Class: Hexacorallia
- Order: Actiniaria
- Family: Actiniidae
- Genus: Epiactis
- Species: E. fernaldi

Binomial name
- Epiactis fernaldi Fautin & Chia, 1986

Species of sea anemone

Epiactis fernaldi, commonly known as the Fernald brooding anemone (not to be confused with Cribrinopsis fernaldi, another sympatric species known as Fernald brooding anemone), is a species of sea anemone in the family Actiniidae. It is native to shallow waters around the San Juan Islands off the western coast of North America.

== Description ==
The Fernald brooding anemone is usually under 2 cm (0.8 in) in diameter. It varies in colour, with different individuals being dull green, reddish-brown, dark orange or yellowish-brown; sometimes there are contrasting light or dark spots on the column. The bases of the tentacles are usually white and there are often dark lines between them which correspond to the internal mesenteries. This anemone is similar in appearance to the common brooding anemone (Epiactis prolifera), especially when contracted, but that species often has juveniles adhering to the outside of the column while the Fernald brooding anemone broods its young internally. The other related species found in the same areas have white radiating lines on the oral disc and striations on the column while Fernald's anemone lacks both of these.

== Distribution and habitat ==
The species is known only from the Barkley Sound in British Columbia, Canada, and the San Juan Islands in Washington state, United States. The population in the latter location is found intertidally on the west coast of the islands, in surge channels with floating logs, and in caves.

== Ecology ==
E. fernaldi is a simultaneous hermaphrodite. The eggs are fertilised internally and also retained in the gastrovascular cavity where they are going to brooded. When the juveniles are released through the mouth, they are likely to be able to disperse more widely than is the case in the closely related Epiactis prolifera and Epiactis lisbethae, which brood their offspring externally, the young eventually crawling away.
