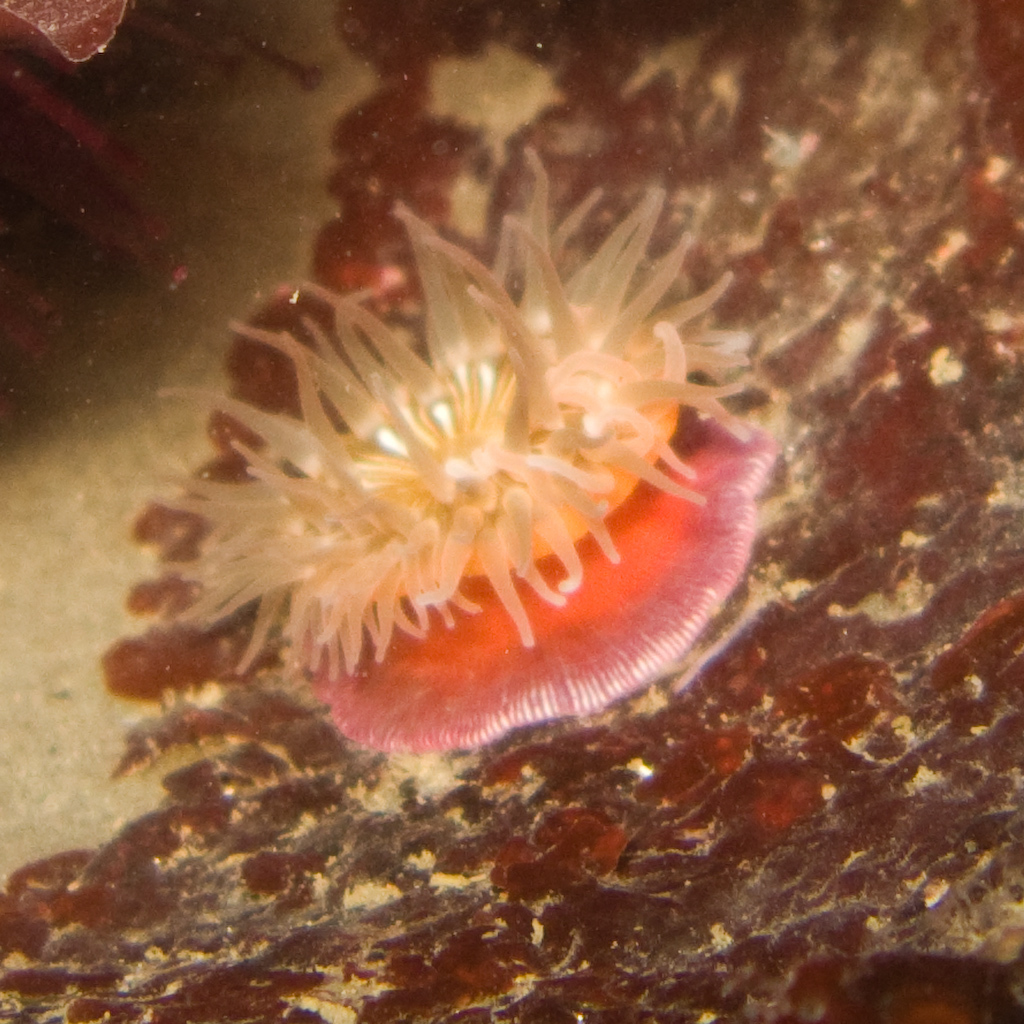

Scientific classification
- Kingdom: Animalia
- Phylum: Cnidaria
- Subphylum: Anthozoa
- Class: Hexacorallia
- Order: Actiniaria
- Family: Actiniidae
- Genus: Epiactis
- Species: E. ritteri

Binomial name
- Epiactis ritteri Torrey, 1902

= Epiactis ritteri =

Species of sea anemone

Epiactis ritteri, the sandy anemone or Ritter's brooding anemone, is a species of sea anemone in the family Actiniidae. It is found in the Pacific Ocean on the western coast of North America in the shallow sub-littoral zone.

== Description ==
Epiactis ritteri is very flat when retracted with a wide, flared pedal base, and can measure 5 cm (2 in) wide and 1 cm (0.4 in) high. The column is unarmed with acontia and has no tubercles, but has some small adhesive warts to which sand or other fragments may stick. There may be radiating lines on the pedal disc at the base of the column. There are broad white markings on the oral disc near the base of the tentacles but these do not extend as far as the mouth, a fact which distinguishes it from the rather similar Epiactis prolifera. The general colour of this anemone is reddish-brown to brown.

== Biology ==
It is likely that this species is largely inbred because it does not have a planktonic stage in its life history. It is a simultaneous hermaphrodite, producing eggs and retaining them in the body cavity where they are fertilised. When the larvae are sufficiently developed, with their tentacles starting to grow, they emerge through the parent's mouth as juvenile anemones and crawl away to settle nearby.
