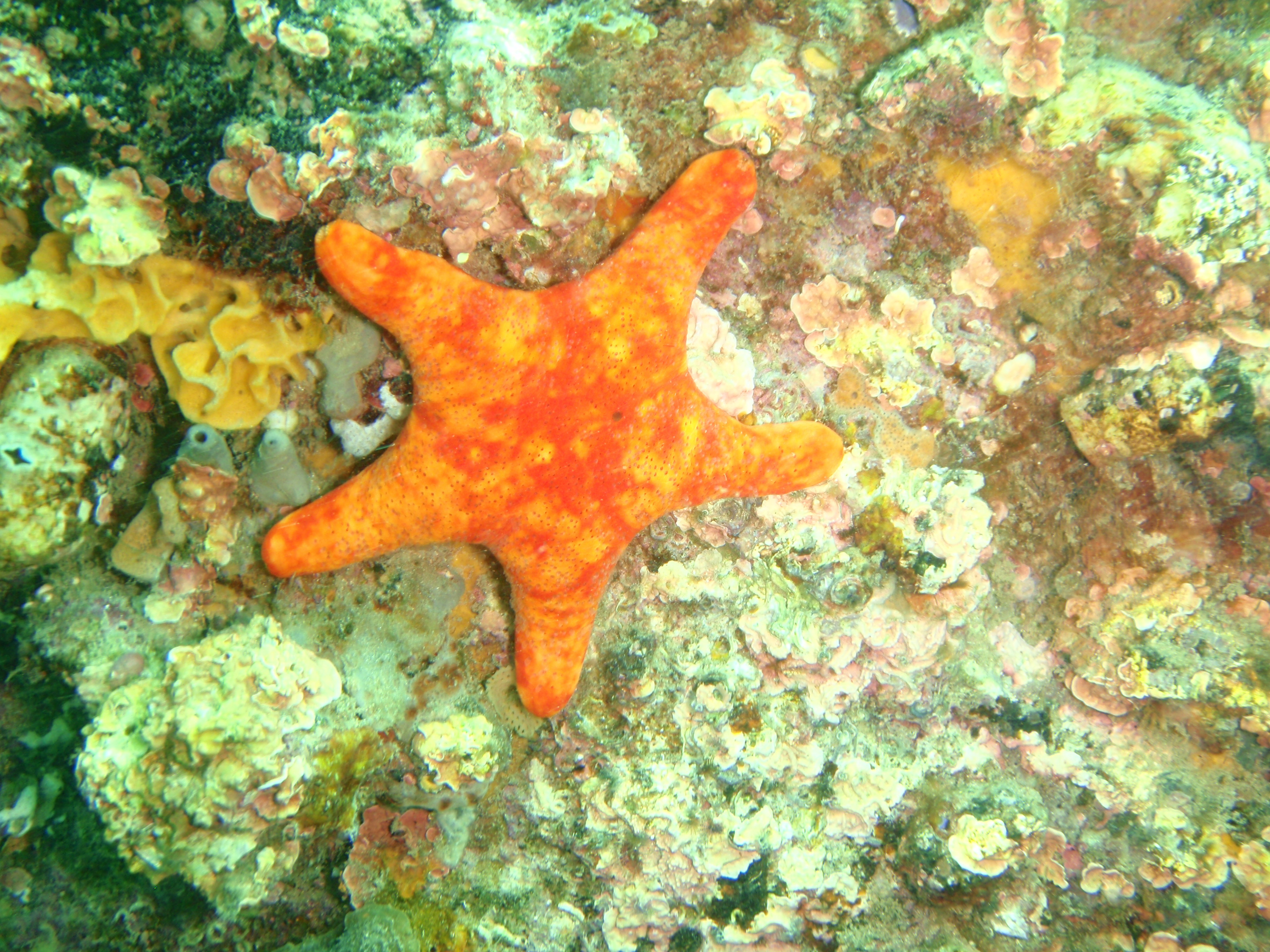

Scientific classification
- Kingdom: Animalia
- Phylum: Echinodermata
- Class: Asteroidea
- Order: Valvatida
- Family: Asteropseidae
- Genus: Petricia
- Species: P. vernicina

Binomial name
- Petricia vernicina (Lamarck, 1816)

= Petricia vernicina =

Species of starfish

Petricia vernicina, the velvet seastar, is a sea star in the family Asteropseidae. It is found in Australia, from Caloundra in Queensland south to Tasmania and west to the Houtman Abrolhos (an island chain off Western Australia), as well as at the Kermadec Islands. It lives at depths ranging between the ocean's surface and 60 metres (197 ft). It feeds on lace coral, sea squirts, and sponges.
