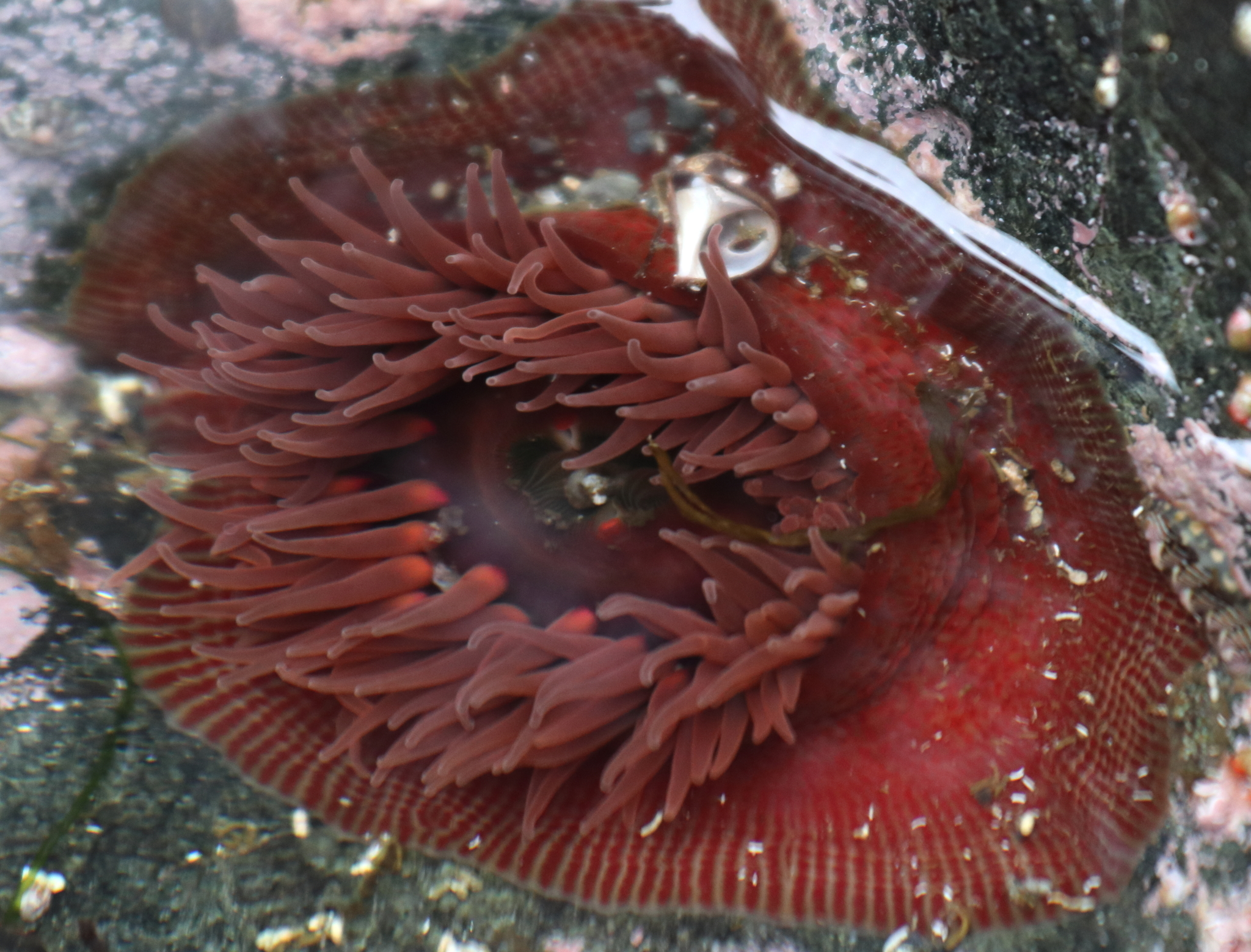

Scientific classification
- Kingdom: Animalia
- Phylum: Cnidaria
- Subphylum: Anthozoa
- Class: Hexacorallia
- Order: Actiniaria
- Family: Actiniidae
- Genus: Epiactis
- Species: E. lisbethae

Binomial name
- Epiactis lisbethae Fautin & Chia, 1986

= Epiactis lisbethae =

Species of sea anemone

Epiactis lisbethae, commonly known as Lisbeth's brooding anemone, is a species of sea anemone in the family Actiniidae. It is similar in appearance to the common brooding anemone (Epiactis prolifera), and like it is native to shallow waters on the western coast of North America.

== Description ==
E. lisbethae is similar to the more common brooding anemone (Epiactis prolifera) but typically is larger, with a column diameter greater than 50 mm (2 in). When contracted, it is dome-shaped, and sand particles do not adhere to the column. Bold striping on the pedal base, which flares out over the rock surface, extends as striations up the column. At some seasons of the year, the young are brooded in a band of several hundred on the outside of the column, and these juveniles are all much the same size. This anemone is dull red, greenish, brown or orange in colour, the oral disc having fine white radial lines extending from the tentacles to the mouth.

== Distribution ==
First described in 1986 from the San Juan Islands of Washington state, the species was named in honour of Lisbeth Francis, a marine biologist at Western Washington University. Its range extends from Bamfield on Vancouver Island, Canada, southwards to Coos Bay in southern Oregon and to northern California, United States. It is uncommon in Oregon and California.

== Ecology ==
The sexes are separate in this anemone and breeding is seasonal. After internal fertilisation, the eggs are initially retained in the gastrovascular cavity. They later are expelled from the mouth and move down the column, where they adhere in a broad belt halfway down; here the larvae are brooded for several months. When sufficiently developed, the juveniles slither or crawl down the column and move to a new location. Red, green and brown anemones tend to have pinkish young while orange individuals usually have orange young.
