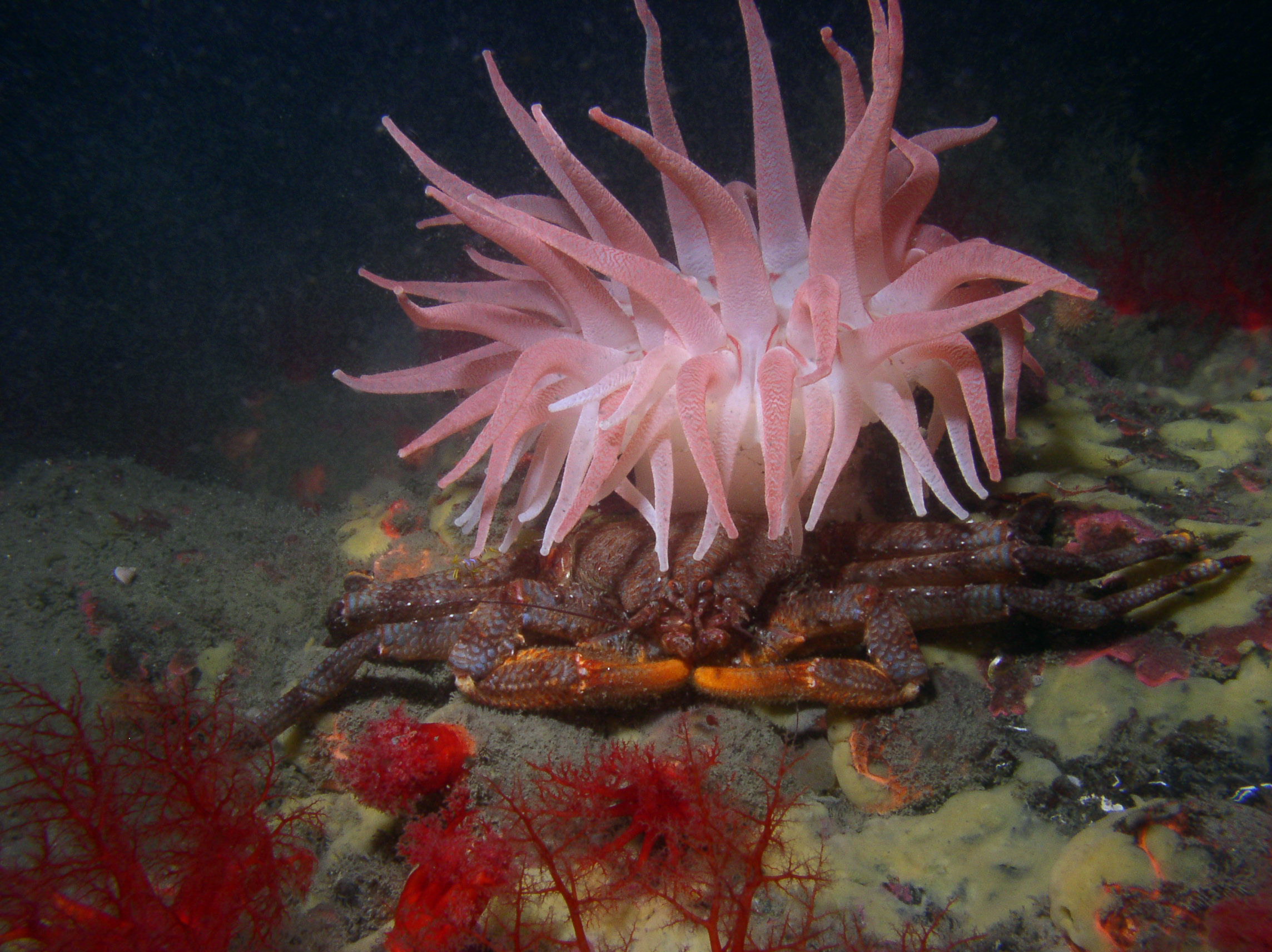
- Cribrinopsis fernaldi

Scientific classification
- Domain: Eukaryota
- Kingdom: Animalia
- Phylum: Cnidaria
- Class: Hexacorallia
- Order: Actiniaria
- Family: Actiniidae
- Genus: Cribrinopsis; Carlgren, 1921

= Cribrinopsis =

Genus of sea anemones

Cribrinopsis is a genus of cnidarians belonging to the family Actiniidae.

The species of this genus are found in Eurasia, Northern America and New Zealand.

The genus contains the following species:

- Cribrinopsis albopunctata Sanamyan & Sanamyan, 2006
- Cribrinopsis crassa (Andrès, 1881)
- Cribrinopsis fernaldi Siebert & Spaulding, 1976
- Cribrinopsis japonica Tsutsui, Hatada & Tsuruwaka, 2014
- Cribrinopsis olegi Sanamyan & Sanamyan, 2006
- Cribrinopsis robertii Parulekar, 1971
- Cribrinopsis rubens Sanamyan, Sanamyan, McDaniel, Martynov, Korshunova & Bocharova, 2019
- Cribrinopsis similis Carlgren, 1921
- Cribrinopsis williamsi Carlgren, 1940
- Cribrionopsis asiatica (uncertain)
