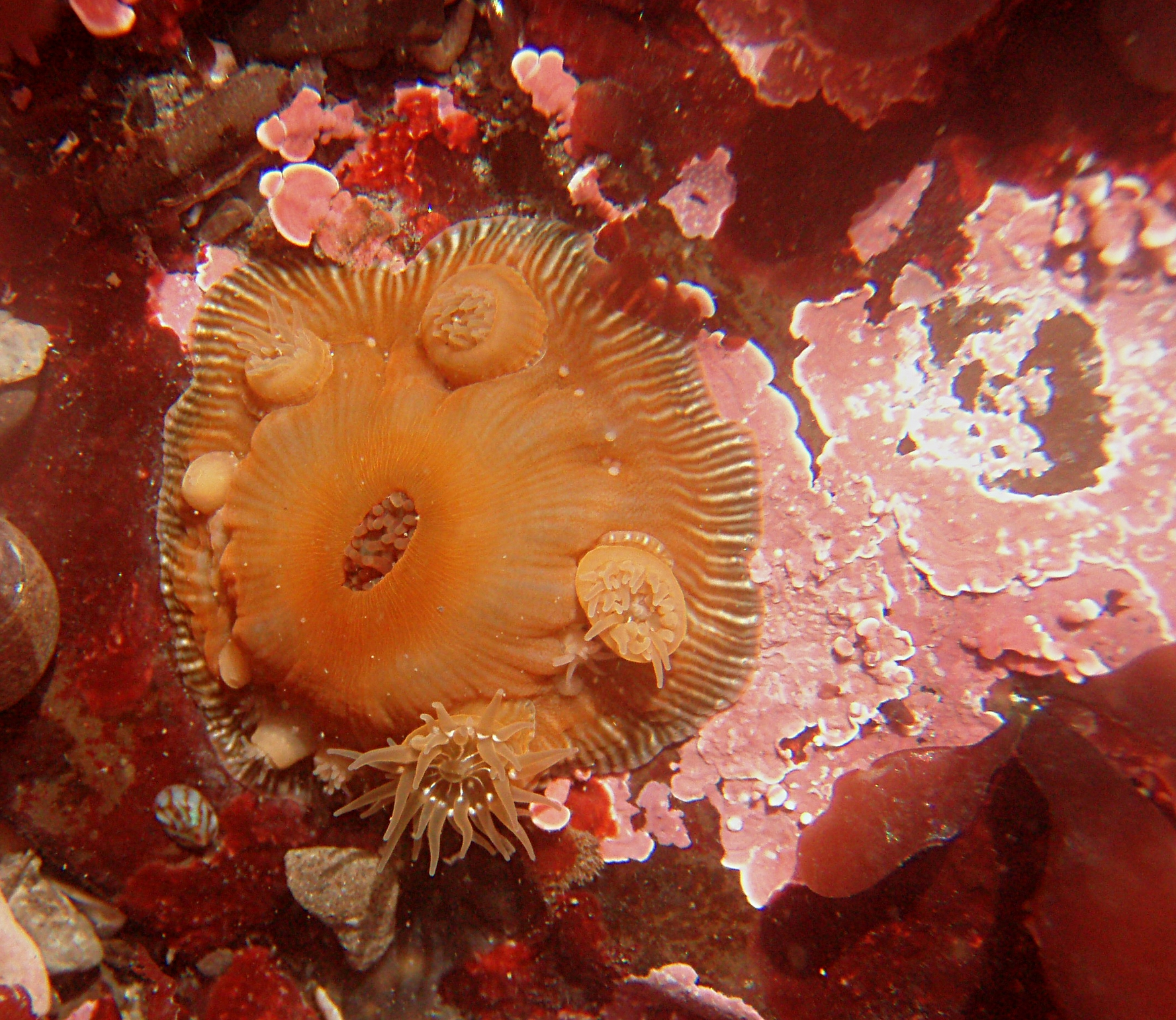
- Epiactis prolifera with young

Scientific classification
- Kingdom: Animalia
- Phylum: Cnidaria
- Subphylum: Anthozoa
- Class: Hexacorallia
- Order: Actiniaria
- Family: Actiniidae
- Genus: Epiactis; Verrill, 1869

Species
- See text

= Epiactis =

Genus of sea anemones

Epiactis is a genus of sea anemones in the family Actiniidae. There are about nineteen recognised species and the type species is Epiactis prolifera.

== Taxonomy ==
A revision in 1989 determined that the genus Cnidopus was a synonym of Epiactis. At this time, two new species, E. lisbethae and E. fernaldi were described and E. ritteri was restored to the genus in which it was originally placed. Four species of Epiactis are known from the Pacific coast of North America, the external brooders E. prolifera and E. lisbethae which differ in sexuality and brooding periodicity, and the internal brooders E. ritteri and E. fernaldi, which differ in their cnidocyte armoury, sexuality and histology.

=== Species ===
Twenty species of Epiactis have been recognized in the World Register of Marine Species:

- Epiactis adeliana Carlgren & Stephenson, 1929
- Epiactis arctica (Verrill, 1868)
- Epiactis australiensis Carlgren, 1950
- Epiactis brucei Carlgren, 1939
- Epiactis fernaldi Fautin & Chia, 1986
- Epiactis georgiana Carlgren, 1927
- Epiactis handi Larson & Daly, 2015
- Epiactis incerta Carlgren, 1921
- Epiactis irregularis Carlgren, 1951
- Epiactis japonica Verrill, 1869
- Epiactis lewisi Carlgren, 1940
- Epiactis lisbethae Fautin & Chia, 1986
- Epiactis marsupialis Carlgren, 1901
- Epiactis neozealandica Stephenson, 1918
- Epiactis nordmanni Carlgren, 1921
- Epiactis novozealandica Stephenson, 1918
- Epiactis prolifera Verrill, 1869
- Epiactis ritteri Torrey, 1902
- Epiactis thompsoni (Coughtrey, 1875)
- Epiactis vincentina Carlgren, 1939

== Description ==
These sea anemones have a substantial base and a smooth column. The margin and fosse are distinct and the sphincter well developed. The tentacles that surround the oral disc are short and unbranched and not narrower at the base. The longitudinal muscles of the tentacles and the radial muscles of the oral disc are usually ectodermal. The mesenteries in the gastroventicular cavity are arranged hexagonally and are greater in number at the base than at the margin. Twelve or more pairs of mesenteries are perfect and the gonads develop on these. The retractors are often very strong and are diffuse or restricted. The cnidocytes include spirocysts, basitriches and microbasic p-mastigophors. Juveniles develop in brood pouches or attached to the column.
