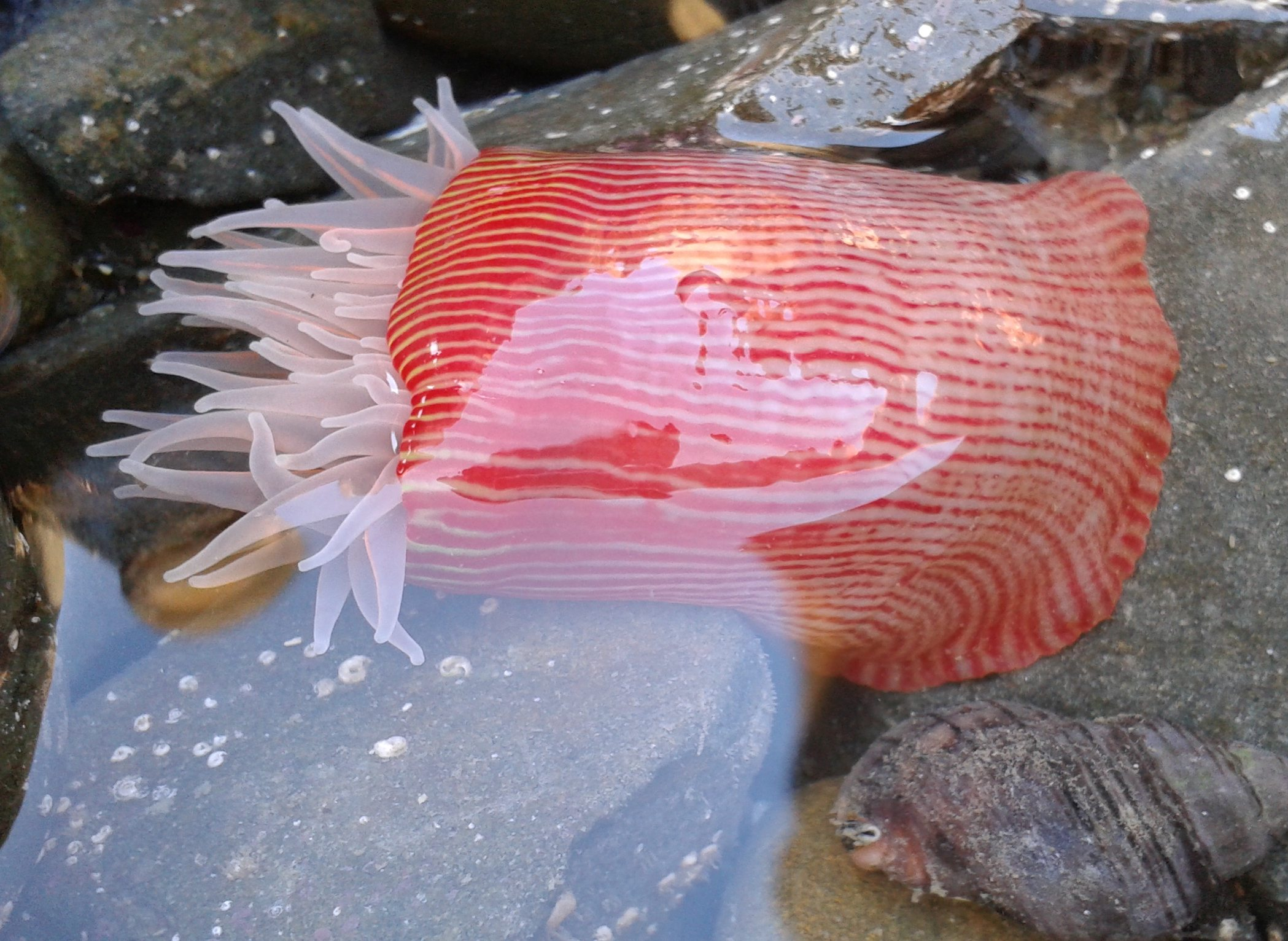

Scientific classification
- Kingdom: Animalia
- Phylum: Cnidaria
- Subphylum: Anthozoa
- Class: Hexacorallia
- Order: Actiniaria
- Family: Actiniidae
- Genus: Epiactis
- Species: E. thompsoni

Binomial name
- Epiactis thompsoni Coughtrey, 1875

= Epiactis thompsoni =

Species of sea anemone

Epiactis thompsoni, the red-striped anemone, is a species of marine invertebrate in the family Actiniidae, found in New Zealand and South Australia. They are commonly found in the rocky intertidal zone.

== Description and habitat ==
The red-striped anemone is relatively large, up to 75 mm. The pedal disc protrudes at the base, diameter of the disc is up to 45 mm. Red and white stripes run vertically up the body, the white sometimes turning a strong yellow or even lime green near the elevated mouth. 60 or so tentacles are arranged in 3 whorls, are usually white with a mauve tip and can be up to 25 mm long. Habits rock pools around the low tide mark, adhering to stones and boulders. Broods its young.

== Reproduction ==
Epiactis thompsoni exhibit internal brooding which is when the offspring remain within the gastrovascular cavity. Internal brooding is beneficial in the harsh intertidal zone and is a means of reducing dispersal. Some offspring in the broods of Epiactis thompsoni are born with multiple oral disks and tentacular crowns. This is thought to be due to the process of fusion of two or more embryos. They are known as being the primary species that brood offspring. Epiactis thompsoni also exhibit continuous reproduction in that they can breed throughout the year. They are also gonochoric meaning that the sexes are separate.

== History ==
There has been confusion with the species name in the literature. In Australian literature, the 'p' from thompsoni has been dropped. The 'p' was originally dropped in Carlgren (1949), so it may be a spelling error that has been since present throughout subsequent literature. The correct spelling is with the 'p', as the species was named after a harbour master in Otago, Captain Thompson.
