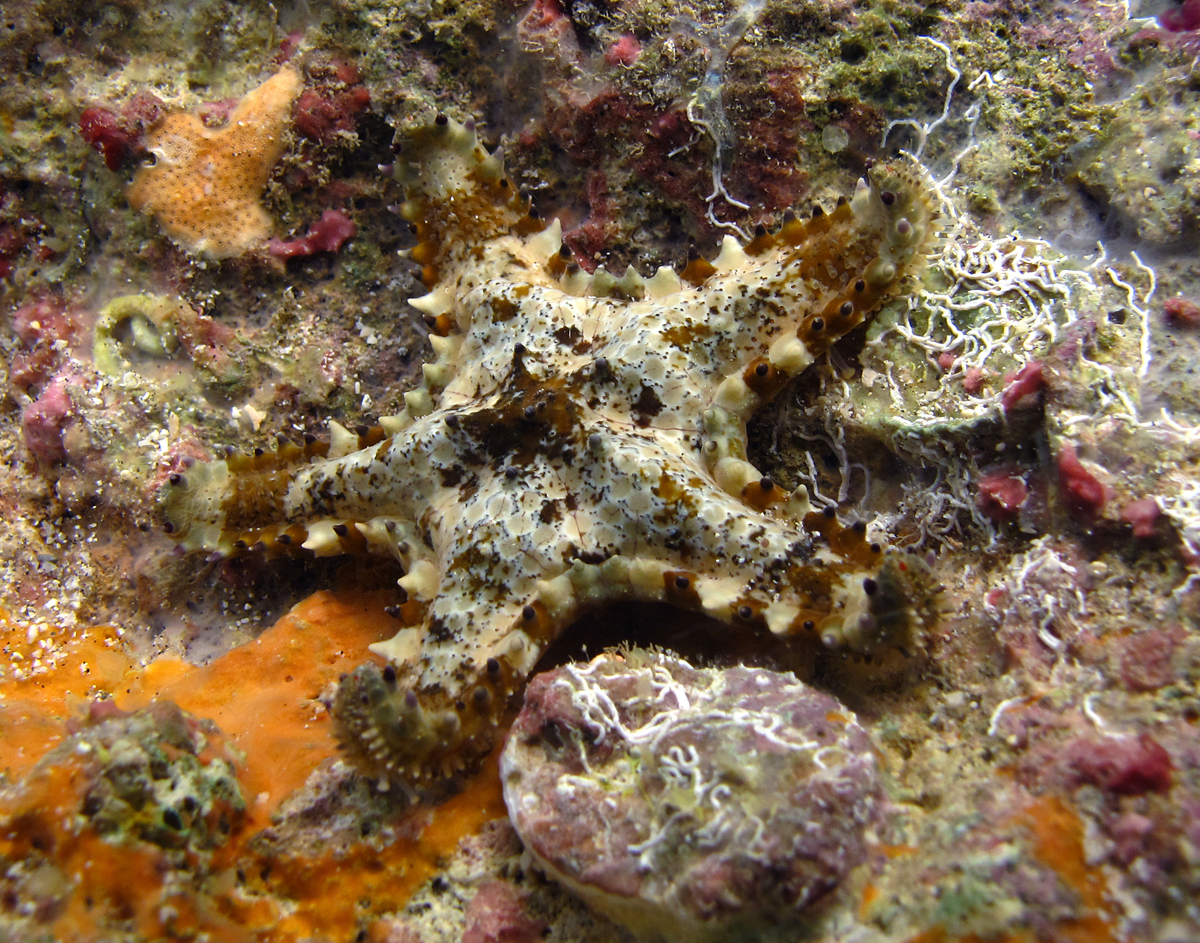
- Asteropsis carinifera

Scientific classification
- Kingdom: Animalia
- Phylum: Echinodermata
- Class: Asteroidea
- Order: Valvatida
- Family: Asteropseidae
- Genus: Asteropsis; Müller & Troschel, 1840

= Asteropsis (echinoderm) =

Genus of starfishes

Asteropsis is a genus of echinoderms belonging to the family Asteropseidae.

The species of this genus are found in Indian and Pacific Ocean. The distribution of this species occurred in the Indo-Malay region, moved to the northern Australia region, southern China, and Taiwan.

Species:

- Asteropsis carinifera (Lamarck, 1816)
- Asteropsis lissoterga (Benham, 1911)
