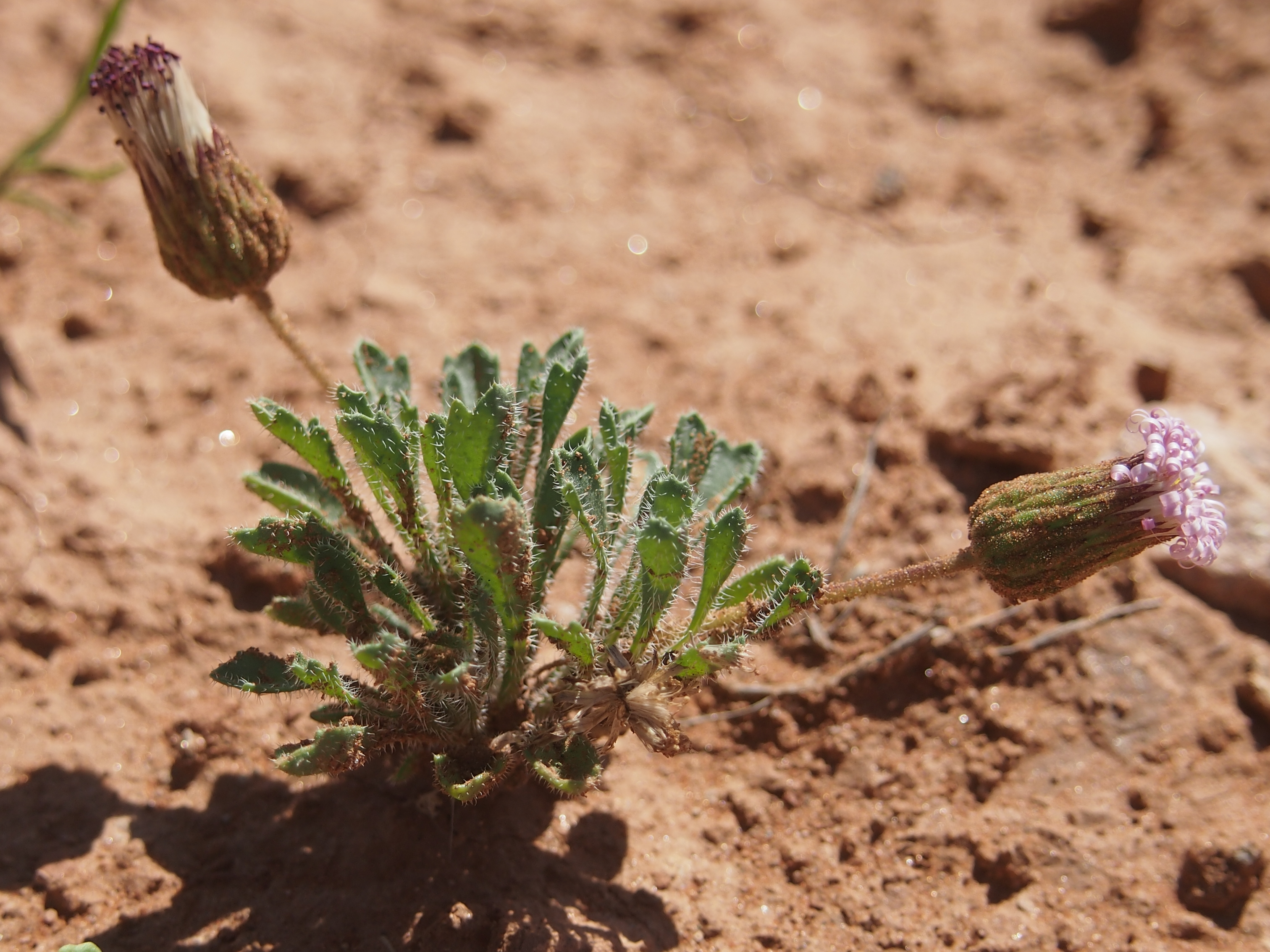
- Ixiochlamys cuneifolia

Scientific classification
- Kingdom: Plantae
- Clade: Tracheophytes
- Clade: Angiosperms
- Clade: Eudicots
- Clade: Asterids
- Order: Asterales
- Family: Asteraceae
- Subfamily: Asteroideae
- Tribe: Astereae
- Subtribe: Brachyscominae
- Genus: Ixiochlamys; F.Muell. & Sond.

Type species
- Ixiochlamys cuneifolia (R.Br.) F.Muell. & Sond.

= Ixiochlamys =

Genus of flowering plants

Ixiochlamys is a genus of Australian flowering plants in the family Asteraceae.

Species

- Ixiochlamys cuneifolia (R.Br.) F.Muell. & Sond. ex F.Muell. & Sond.
- Ixiochlamys filicifolia Dunlop
- Ixiochlamys integerrima Dunlop
- Ixiochlamys nana (Ewart & Jean White) Grau
