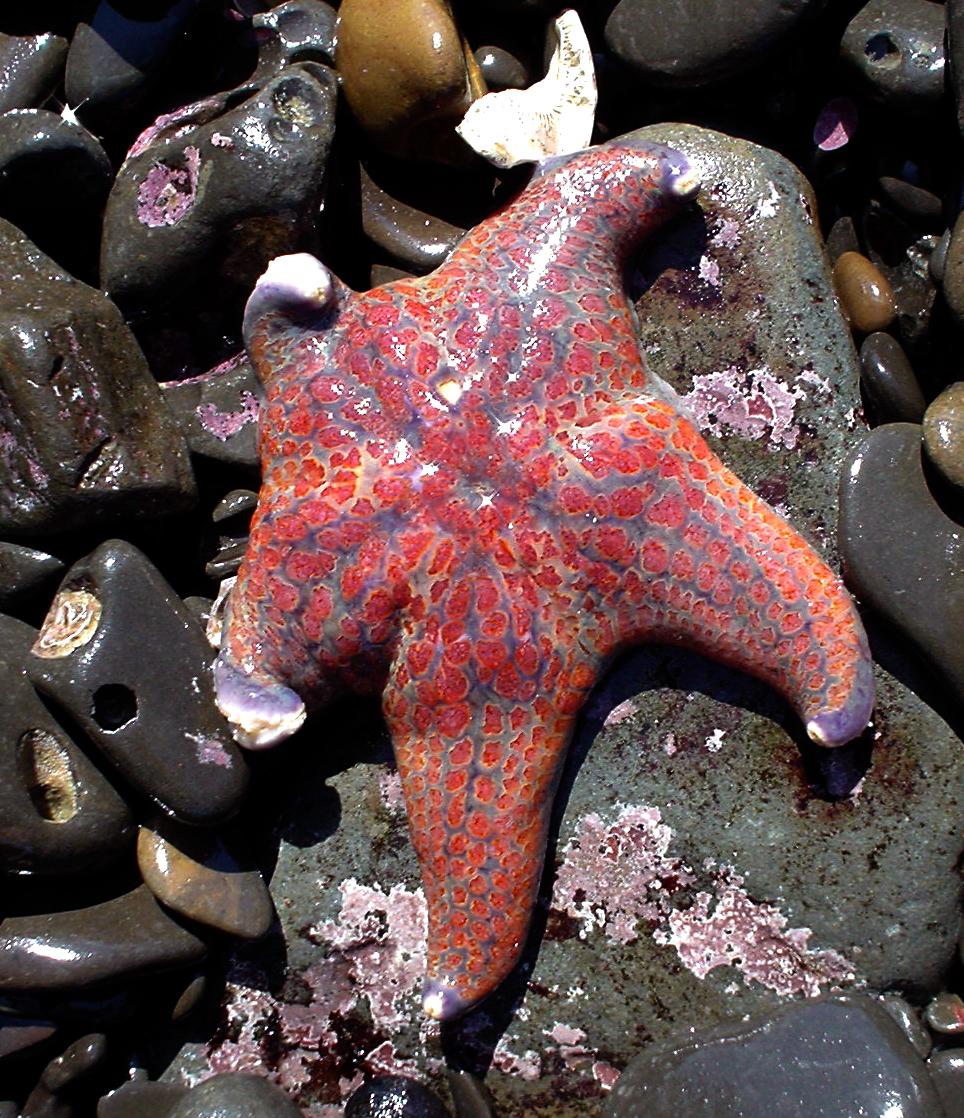
- In a California tidepool

Scientific classification
- Kingdom: Animalia
- Phylum: Echinodermata
- Class: Asteroidea
- Order: Valvatida
- Family: Asteropseidae
- Genus: Dermasterias
- Species: D. imbricata

Binomial name
- Dermasterias imbricata (Grube, 1857)

Synonyms
- Asteropsis imbricata Grube, 1857

= Leather star =

Species of starfish

The leather star (Dermasterias imbricata) is a sea star in the family Asteropseidae found at depths to 100 m (328 ft) off the western seaboard of North America. It was first described to science by Adolph Eduard Grube in 1857.

== Description ==
The leather star has a broad central disc and five plump, short arms which taper broadly from the central disc. The arms have two rows of tube feet and no bordering marginal plates. The upper, aboral, surface is smooth and velvety, made more so by the absence of spines and a light layer of mucous. It is covered with a reticulated pattern in reddish-brown, often with patches of greyish-blue. No pedicellariae are present, but the madreporite can be seen. This starfish can grow to about 30 centimetres (12 in) in diameter and has a distinctive smell that resembles garlic and sulphur.

== Distribution and habitat ==
The range of the leather star includes the western seaboard of North America from Cook Inlet, Alaska to northern Mexico. It occurs in Puget Sound. It lives in the intertidal zone and in deeper water down to depths of about 100 metres (330 ft). It is found on rocky bottoms and occasionally sandy seabeds.

== Biology ==
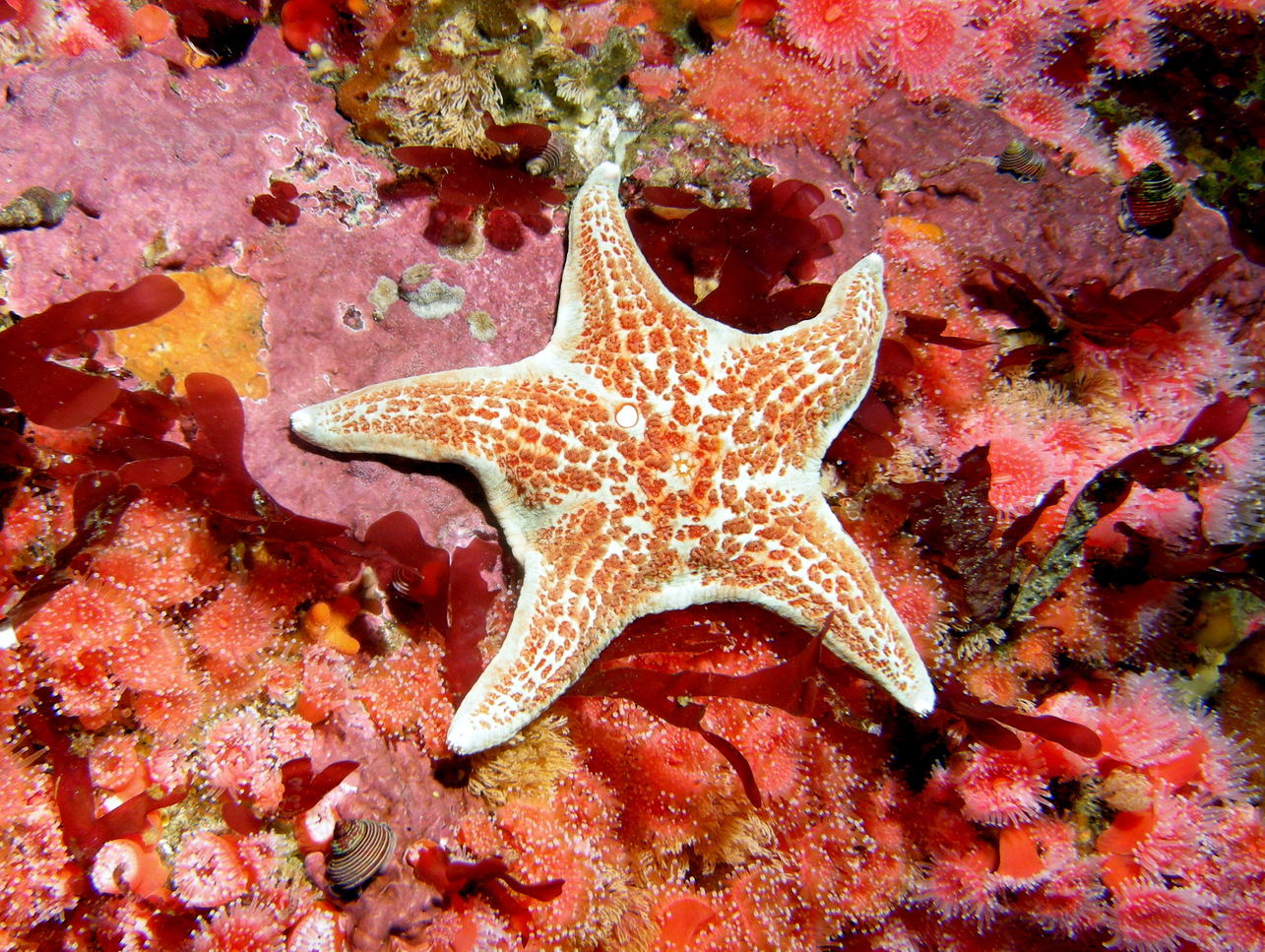
D. imbricata, offshore Carmel, California

The leather star feeds on algae and a range of invertebrates, including other asteroids, bryozoans, sea urchins, sponges, sea cucumbers, hydroids, sea pens, and colonial tunicates.

It is in turn preyed on by the morning sun star (Solaster dawsoni). In its attempts to evade this voracious predator, it crawls away at a maximum speed of 15 cm/min, but this is too slow, and leather stars make up 50% of the diet of morning sun stars.

Off the Washington coast, spawning is from April to August. The females release yellow eggs which are fertilized in the water column. The larvae then become part of the zooplankton.

The leather star sometimes lives symbiotically with the scaleworm Arctonoe vittata. The worm also associates with various other marine invertebrates, but if separated from its host, will search out another member of the same species. The worm may nip off the heads of small tube-dwelling polychaetes as the starfish moves around, but is not harmed by its host.

The parasitic barnacle genus Dendrogaster is sometimes an endoparasite of the leather star.
