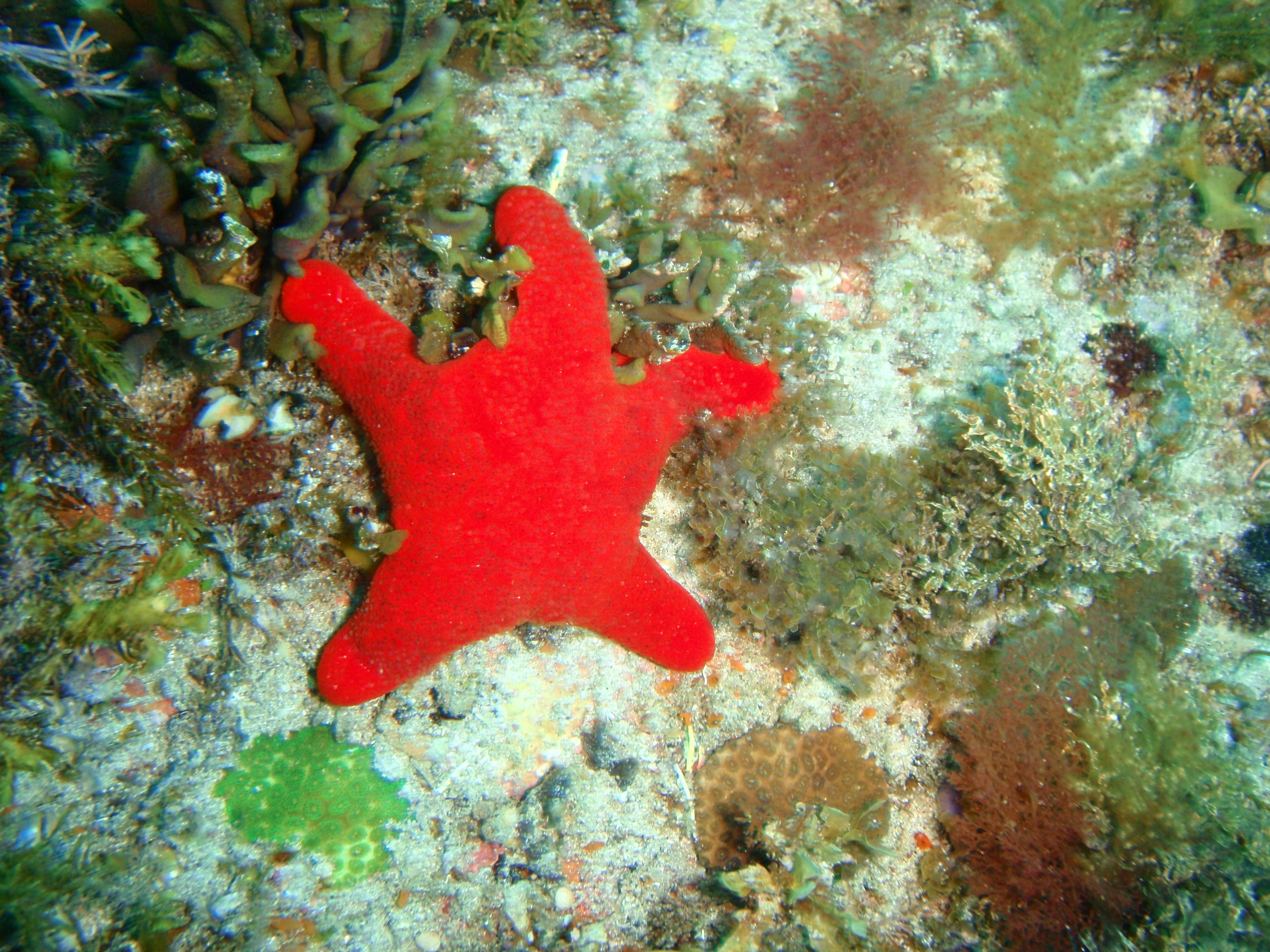
- Petricia vernicina

Scientific classification
- Kingdom: Animalia
- Phylum: Echinodermata
- Class: Asteroidea
- Order: Valvatida
- Family: Asteropseidae; Hotchkiss & Clark, 1976

Genera
- See text.

Synonyms
- Asteropidae; Gymnasteriidae; Valvasteridae; Valvasterinae

= Asteropseidae =

Family of starfishes

Asteropseidae is a family of sea stars. Members of the family have relatively broad discs and five short tapering arms.

== Genera ==
The following genera are listed in the World Register of Marine Species:

- Asteropsis Müller & Troschel, 1840
- Dermasterias Perrier, 1875
- Petricia Gray, 1847
- Poraniella Verrill, 1914
- Valvaster Perrier, 1875

== Gallery ==
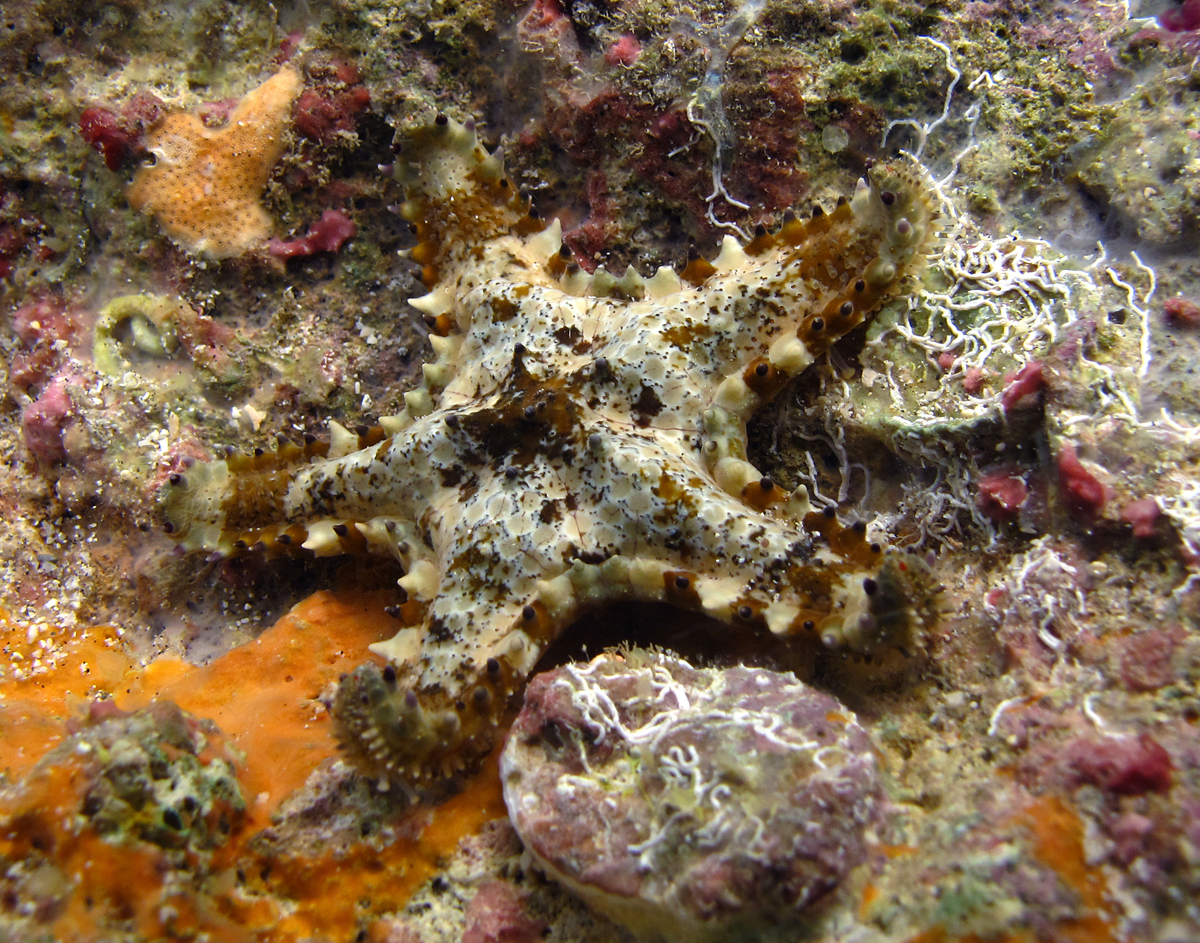
Asteropsis carinifera

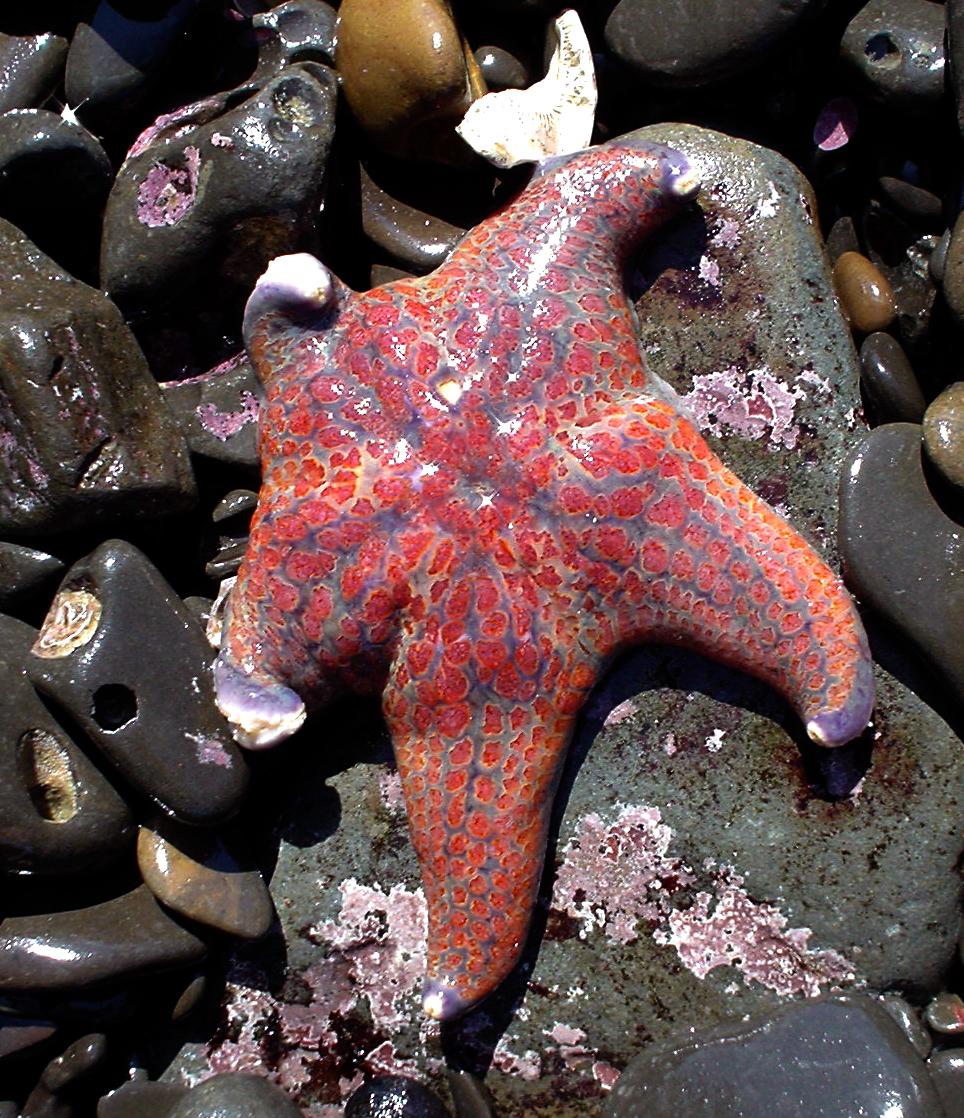
Dermasterias imbricata

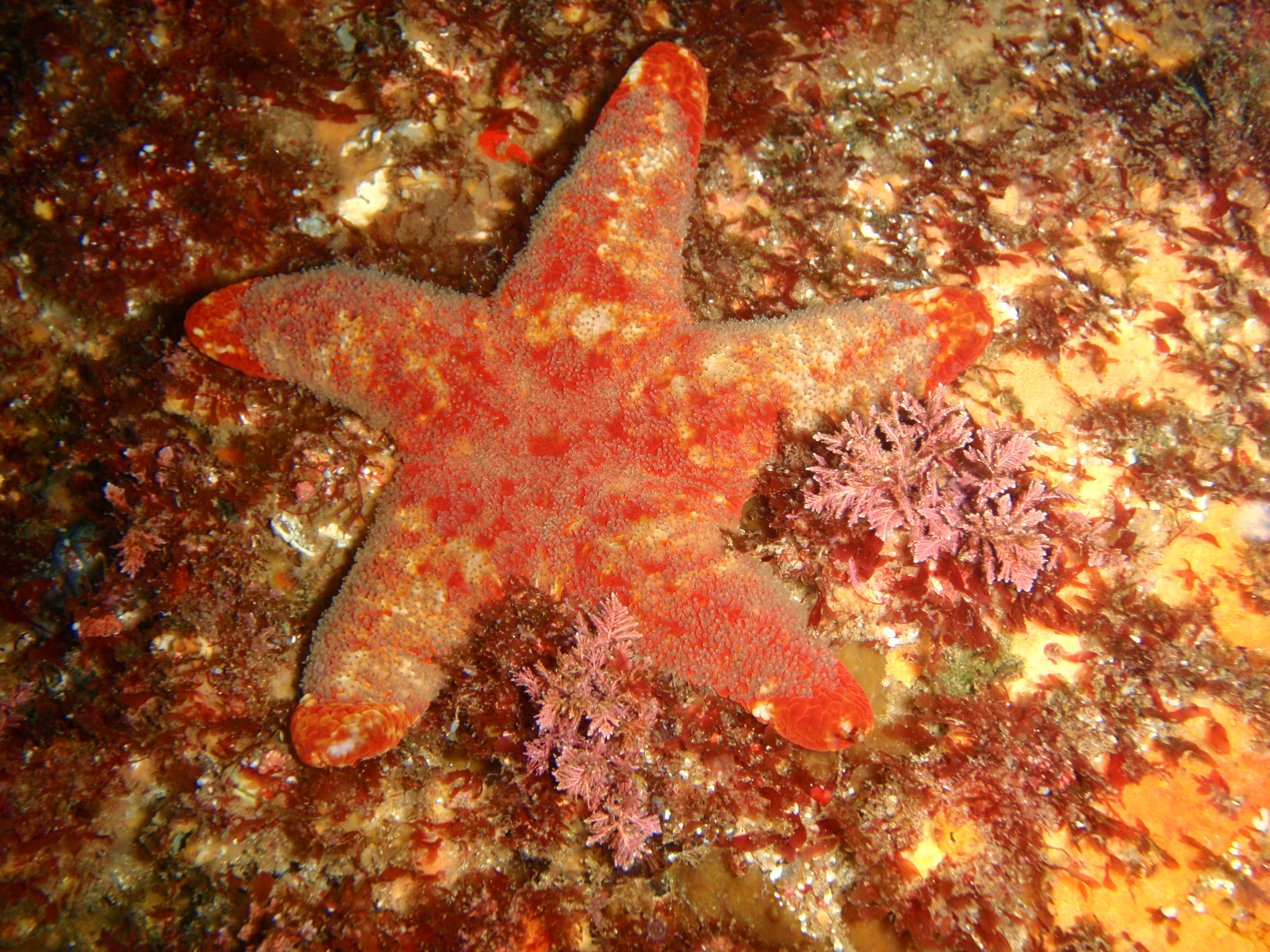
Petricia vernicina

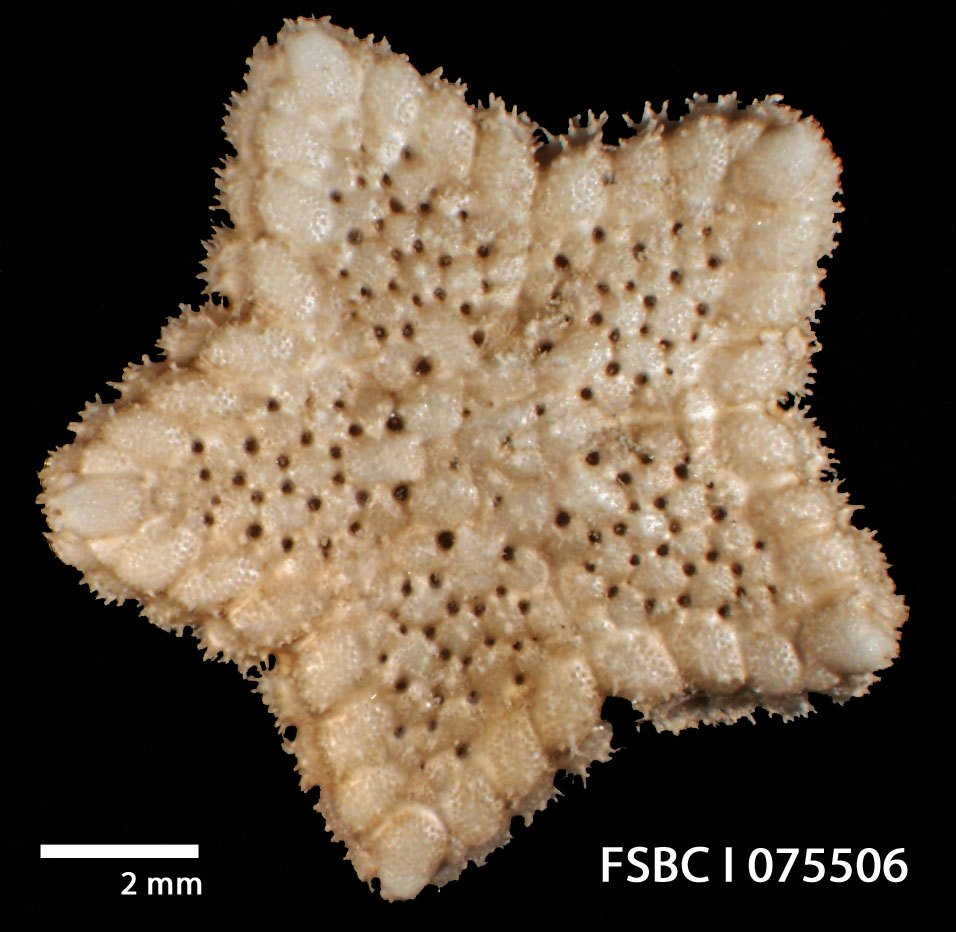
Poraniella echinulata
