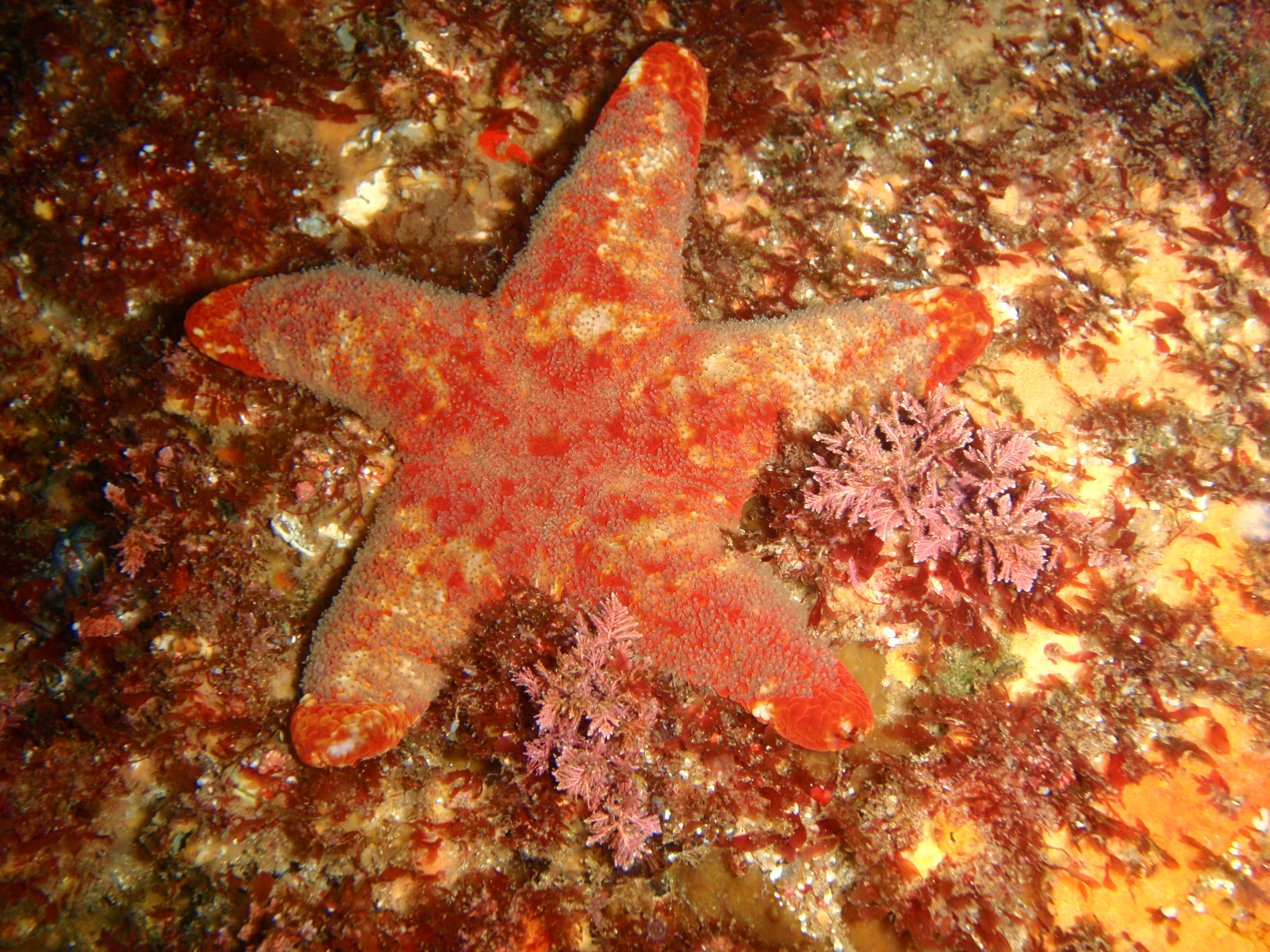
- The Petricia Vernicina at Alligator rock, Bicheno, Tasmania

Scientific classification
- Kingdom: Animalia
- Phylum: Echinodermata
- Class: Asteroidea
- Order: Valvatida
- Family: Asteropseidae
- Genus: Petricia; Gray, 1847

= Petricia =

Genus of sea stars

Petricia is a genus of sea stars belonging to the family Asteropseidae.

The species of this genus are found in Australia.

Species:

- Petricia imperialis (Farquhar, 1897)
- Petricia vernicina (Lamarck, 1816)
