= Exostigma =

Scientific classification
- Kingdom: Plantae
- Clade: Tracheophytes
- Clade: Angiosperms
- Clade: Eudicots
- Clade: Asterids
- Order: Asterales
- Family: Asteraceae
- Subfamily: Asteroideae
- Tribe: Astereae
- Subtribe: Podocominae
- Genus: Exostigma; G.Sancho

Species
- Exostigma notobellidiastrum (Griseb.) G.Sancho; Exostigma rivulare (Gardner) G.Sancho

Genus of flowering plants

Exostigma is a genus of flowering plants in the family Asteraceae. It includes two species native to South America, ranging from central Brazil and Bolivia to northern Argentina.

- Exostigma notobellidiastrum (Griseb.) G.Sancho
- Exostigma rivulare (Gardner) G.Sancho
