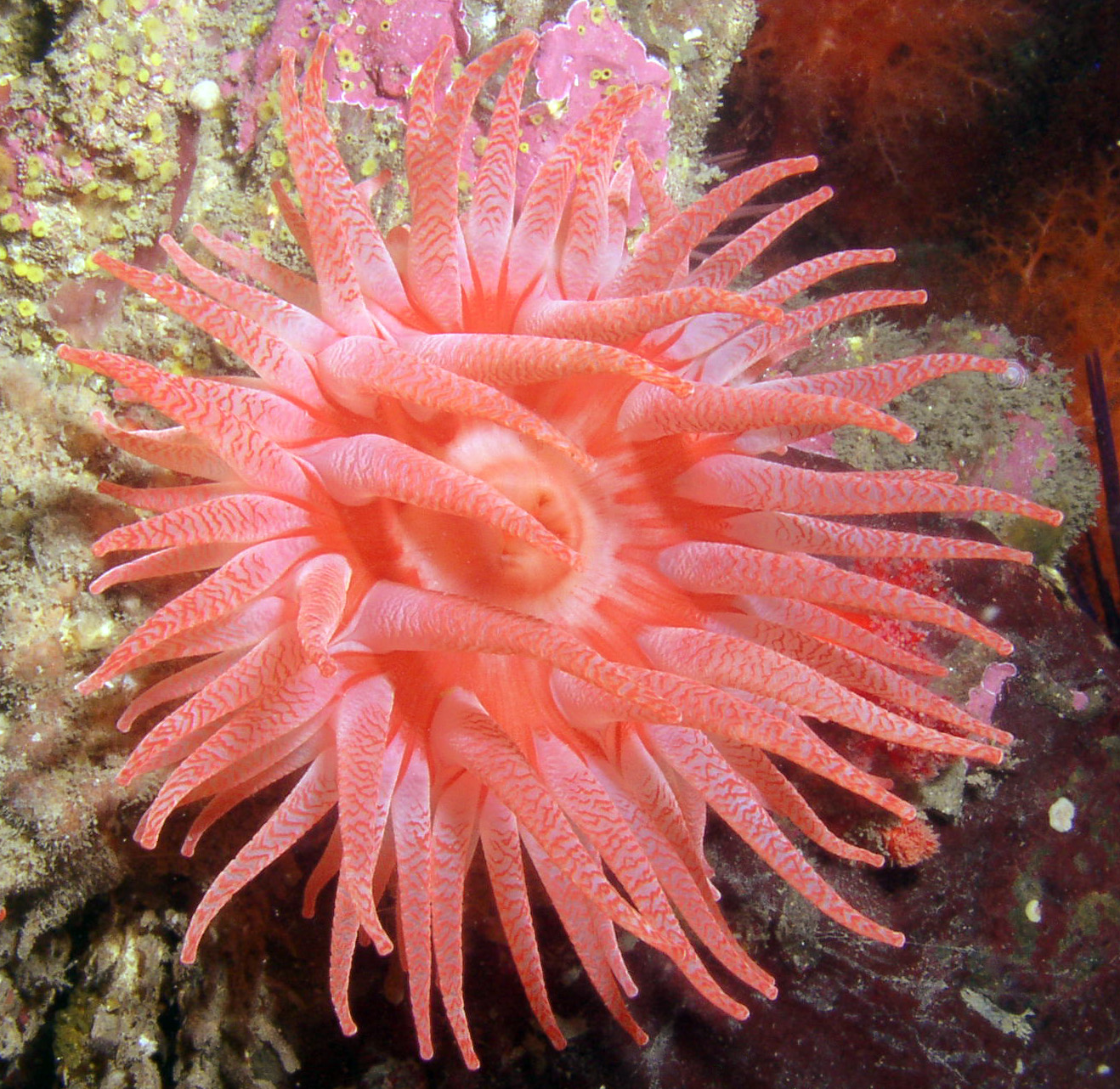

Scientific classification
- Domain: Eukaryota
- Kingdom: Animalia
- Phylum: Cnidaria
- Class: Hexacorallia
- Order: Actiniaria
- Family: Actiniidae
- Genus: Cribrinopsis
- Species: C. fernaldi

Binomial name
- Cribrinopsis fernaldi Siebert & Spaulding, 1976

= Cribrinopsis fernaldi =

Crimson anemone

Species of sea anemone

Cribrinopsis fernaldi, also known as the crimson anemone, snakelock anemone, chevron-tentacle anemone and Fernald brooding anemone (not to be confused with Epiactis fernaldi, another sympatric species known as Fernald brooding anemone), is a sea anemone native to the Pacific Ocean off northwestern North America.

== Description ==
Cribrinopsis fernaldi is a large anemone that can be crimson red, orange or white. This species has zigzag transverse lines on its tentacles, white tubercles on its column, and spherules just below the tentacles. These spherules can be especially hard to see as they are often withdrawn. The column is up to 20 cm (8 in) in diameter and around 25 cm (10 in) high. The oral disk has yellow or pink lines radiating from the mouth to the margin. These can be difficult to see in dark red individuals.

== Similar species ==
Urticina crassicornis is another common large red anemone with lines radiating on the oral disk from the mouth towards the margin. U. crassicornis has transverse bands on the tentacles, but these are broad and straight, unlike C. fernaldi, which has thin zigzag transverse stripes. Additionally, the bands on U. crassicornis are fainter, appearing to be internal. In contrast, the bands on C. fernaldi appear to be superficial and are much bolder. U. crassicornis has column that is green mottled with red and C. fernaldi has a column that is red with regular white spots on tubercles.

== Range ==
C. fernaldi occurs from the Gulf of Alaska to Washington. It is strictly subtidal to 300 m (980 ft) depth.

== Biology ==
Many different species of decapods look for refuge near or within the tentacles of this anemone, especially shrimp in the families Hippolytidae and Pandalidae. Hippolytid shrimp found in association with C. fernaldi include the Candy Striped Shrimp (Lebbeus grandimanus), Lebbeus groenlandicus and Eualus suckleyi; Pandalid shrimp found in association with this anemone include Pandalus tridens. Two crabs that are occasionally found in association with C. fernaldi are the lithodid crabs Phyllolithodes papillosus and Placetron wosnessenskii.

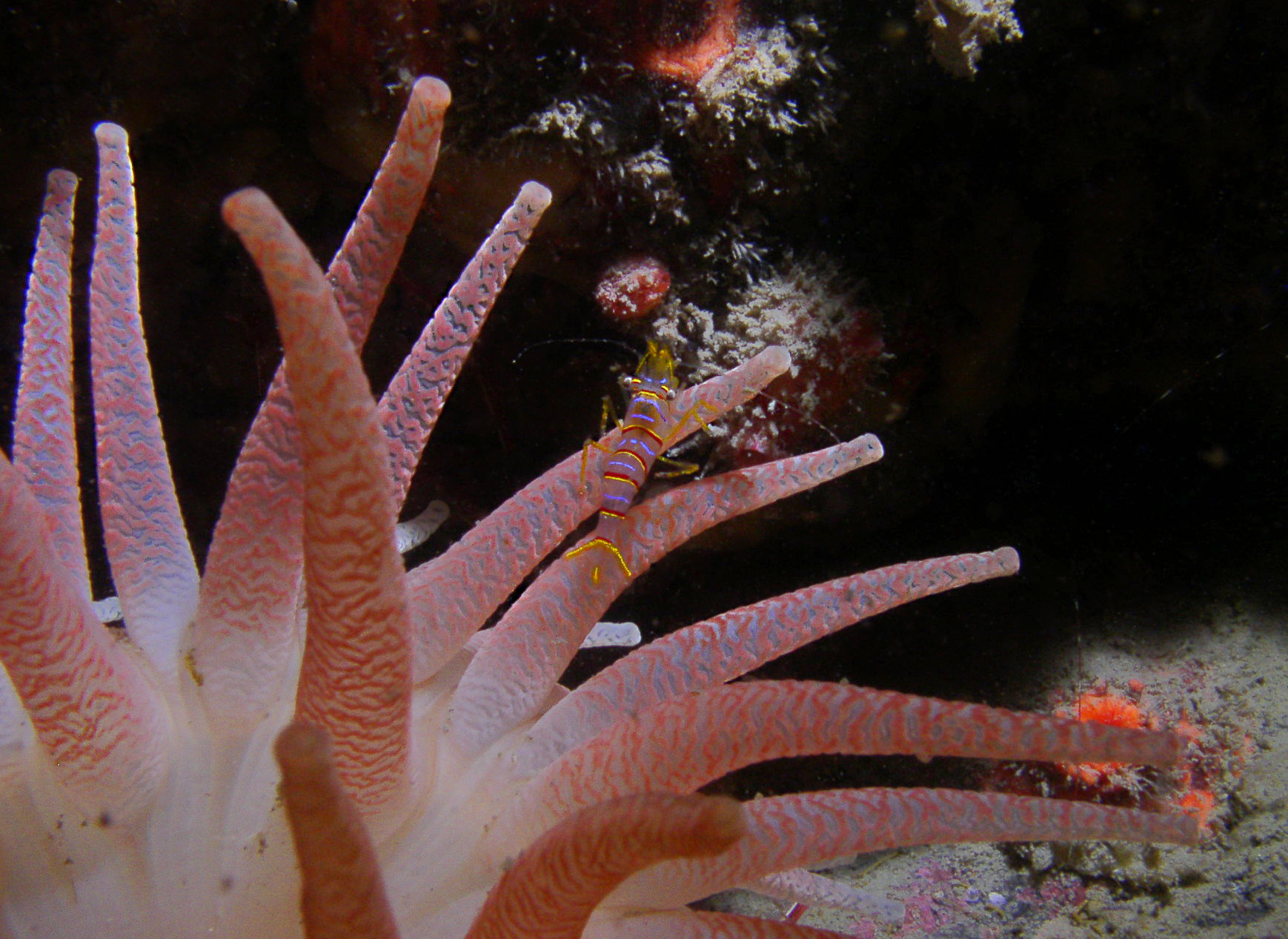
A Candy Striped Shrimp, Lebbeus grandimanus, on a Crimson Anemone, Cribrinopsis fernaldi

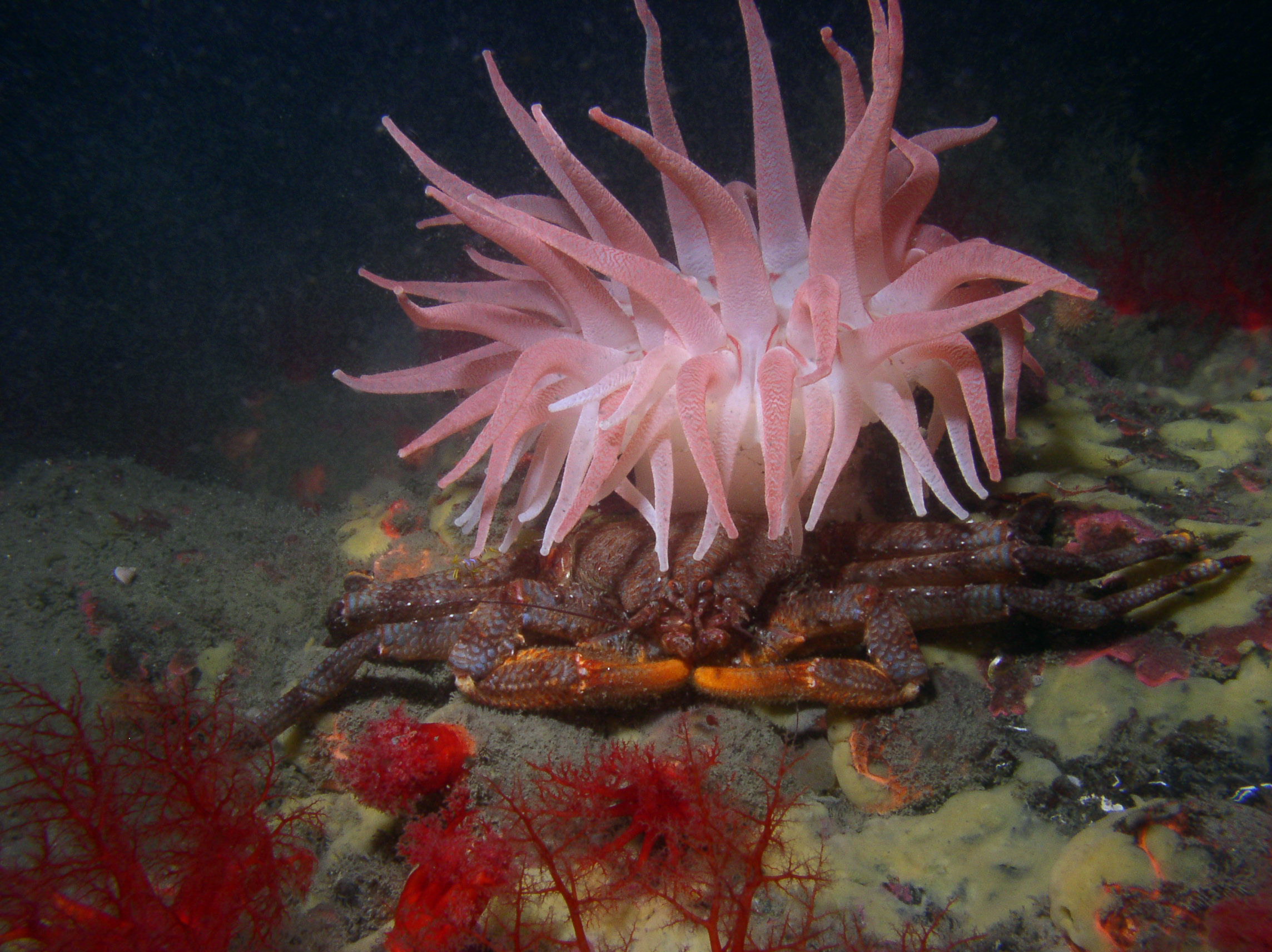
A Scaled Crab, Placetron wosnessenskii, taking refuge under a Crimson Anemone, Cribrinopsis fernaldi
