= Asteropsis (plant) =

Scientific classification
- Kingdom: Plantae
- Clade: Tracheophytes
- Clade: Angiosperms
- Clade: Eudicots
- Clade: Asterids
- Order: Asterales
- Family: Asteraceae
- Subfamily: Asteroideae
- Tribe: Astereae
- Subtribe: Baccharidinae
- Genus: Asteropsis; Less.

Type species
- Asteropsis macrocephala Less.

Genus of flowering plants

Asteropsis is a genus of South American plant in the tribe Astereae within the family Asteraceae.

Species

- Asteropsis macrocephala Less. - Uruguay, Rio Grande do Sul
- Asteropsis megapotamica (Spreng.) Marchesi & al. - Rio Grande do Sul
