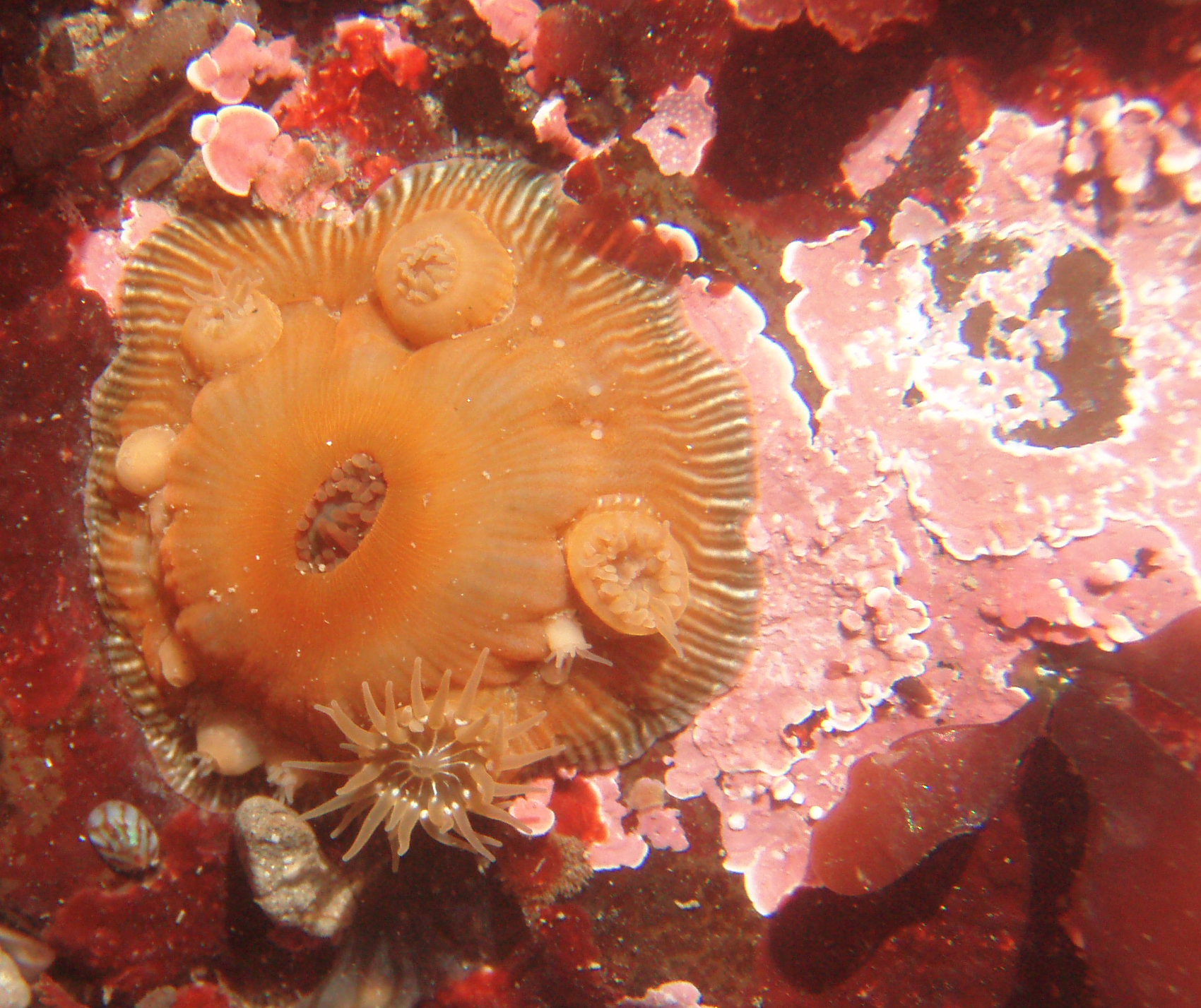
- Epiactis prolifera with young

Scientific classification
- Kingdom: Animalia
- Phylum: Cnidaria
- Subphylum: Anthozoa
- Class: Hexacorallia
- Order: Actiniaria
- Family: Actiniidae
- Genus: Epiactis
- Species: E. prolifera

Binomial name
- Epiactis prolifera Verrill, 1869

= Epiactis prolifera =

Species of sea anemone

Epiactis prolifera, the brooding, proliferating or small green anemone, is a species of marine invertebrate in the family Actiniidae. It is found in the north-eastern Pacific. It has a feature rare among animals in that all individuals start life as females but develop testes later in their lives to become hermaphrodites.

== Description ==
The brooding anemone grows to three centimetres high and up to five centimetres in diameter and varies in colour, usually being greenish-brown but sometimes brown, pink, red or dull green. There are fine white lines starting at the mouth and spreading radially across the oral disc and further white lines occur on the column and pedal disc. The lower part of the column and pedal disc are occasionally blue. There are often radiating pale and dark lines on the edges of the pedal disc and the lower part of the column. The mouth is surrounded by 48 to 96 short, conical tentacles each tipped with a terminal pore.

== Distribution and habitat ==
The brooding anemone is found in shallow areas of the north-east Pacific Ocean. The highest density is on or under rocks in the sublittoral zone, in surge channels, on rock shelves and areas exposed to wave action. It is often found in areas encrusted with coralline algae and sometimes grows on the leaves of eelgrass. It cannot tolerate exposure to the drying air and sunlight. The brooding anemone moves around over the substrate to a greater extent than do other anemones.

== Biology ==
Epiactis prolifera is a protogynous hermaphrodite. The young all start life as females but when the pedal disc is about two centimetres in diameter, they develop testes on the mesentery and spend the rest of their lives as hermaphrodites. This means that the population consists of a large number of young females and a small number of older hermaphrodites. Reproduction is not limited to any particular season. Sperm is released into the water column and after cross-fertilisation (or sometimes self-fertilisation), the young remain within the mother's gastrovascular cavity during their early development. The mother then expels a mass of eggs and mucus through her mouth and they spread across her oral disc. Cilia move some of them down the column and they become attached to the base of the column with mucus, and perhaps also nematocysts. The larvae develop tentacles of their own and grow in this protective environment for at least three months. When they reach about four millimetres in diameter, they separate from their mother and move away to live independently.

If the anemone is damaged and broken in pieces, the various fragments are each able to grow into a new individual.

The diet consists of small fish, shrimps, crabs and jellyfish. The prey is immobilised by the nematocysts in the tentacles which inject toxins, then passed by the tentacles through the mouth and into the gastrovascular cavity. Any undigested remains are expelled through the mouth.

== Ecology ==
Despite their stinging nematocysts, brooding anemones are a favoured prey for certain other animals. Many nudibranchs seem to be immune to the toxin and both eat them and can store the unused nematocysts for their own defence. Predators include the nudibranch Aeolidia papillosa, the leather star Dermasterias imbricata and certain fish, such as the mosshead sculpin (Clinocottus globiceps).

This anemone sometimes displays mutualism by attaching itself to a hermit crab or decorator crab. The anemone provides protection for the host from predators and itself benefits by being able to consume food fragments discarded by the crab.

The copepod, Doridicola sunnivae, is an ectoparasite of the brooding anemone.
