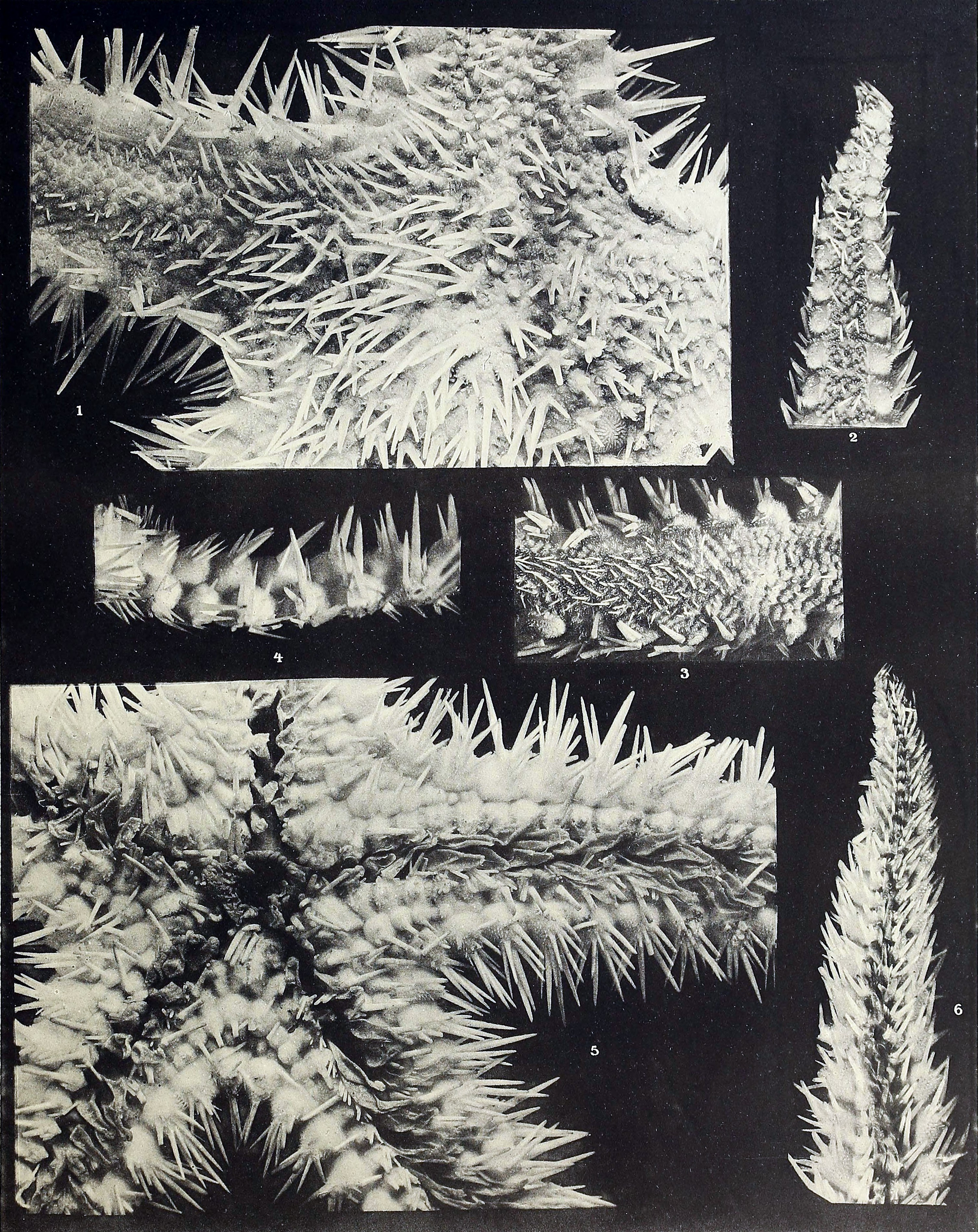

Scientific classification
- Kingdom: Animalia
- Phylum: Echinodermata
- Class: Asteroidea
- Order: Notomyotida
- Family: Benthopectinidae
- Genus: Acontiaster
- Species: A. bandanus

Binomial name
- Acontiaster bandanus Döderlein, 1921

= Acontiaster =

Genus of starfishes

Acontiaster is a genus of starfish in the family Benthopectinidae, containing the single species Acontiaster bandanus.
