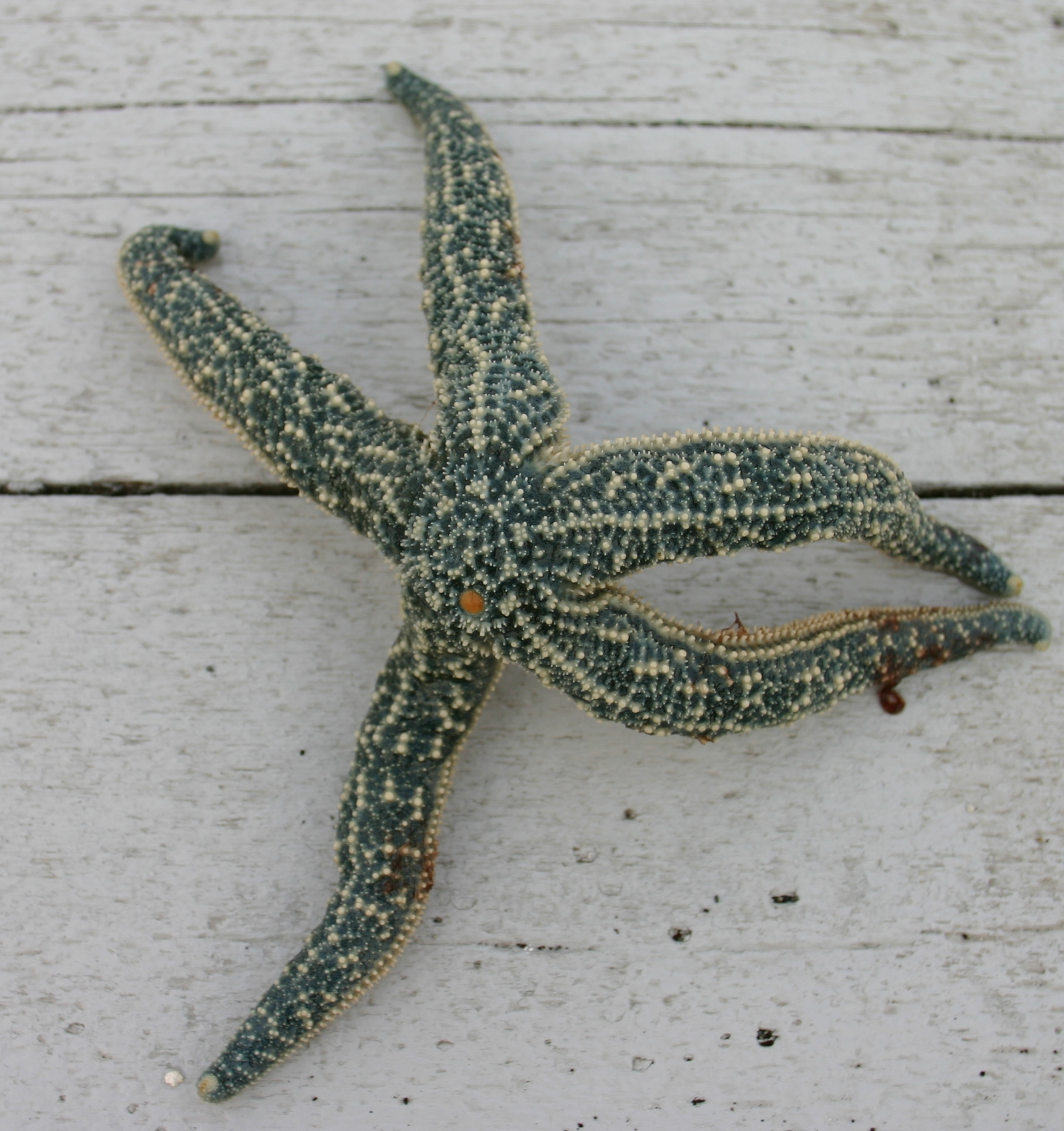

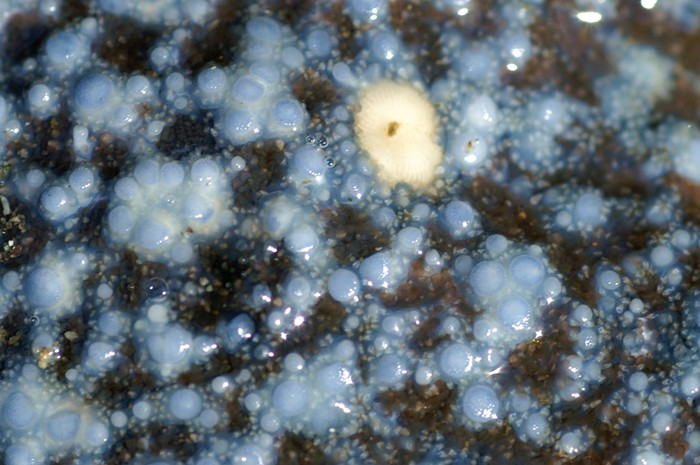
- Close-up of the disc and madreporite

Scientific classification
- Kingdom: Animalia
- Phylum: Echinodermata
- Class: Asteroidea
- Order: Forcipulatida
- Family: Asteriidae
- Genus: Evasterias
- Species: E. troschelii

Binomial name
- Evasterias troschelii (Stimpson, 1862)

Synonyms
- Evasterias troscheli (Stimpson, 1862), lapsus; Asterias acanthostoma Verrill, 1909; Asterias brachiata Perrier, 1875; Asterias epichlora Brandt, 1835; Asterias troscheli Stimpson, 1862; Asterias victoriana Verrill, 1909; Evasterias acanthostoma (Verrill, 1909); Evasterias alveolata Verrill, 1894; Evasterias troschelii Stimpson, 1862; Leptasterias epichlora (Brandt, 1835); Leptasterias inaequalis Verrill, 1914; Leptasterias macouni Verrill, 1914

= Evasterias troschelii =

Species of starfish

Evasterias troschelii is a species of starfish in the family Asteriidae. Its common names include the mottled star, false ochre sea star and Troschel's true star. It is found in Kamchatka and the north western coast of North America.

== Taxonomy ==
The description of this species was first formally published in 1862 by William Stimpson under the name Asterias troschelii (Stimpson first presented the new species in a lecture at the Boston Society of Natural History in 1861). The holotype was collected in Puget Sound, Washington. Only part of one arm still remains of this smallish specimen at the United States National Museum.

It was moved to the new genus Evasterias by Addison Emery Verrill in 1914, with as the type species. Verrill published five new varieties (alveolata, densa, parvispina, rudis and subnodosa) besides the nominate variety, and also published E. acanthostoma in 1914.

Alexander Michailovitsch Djakonov synonymised all of Verrill's varieties, but retained alveolata as a forma, and also made Verrill's E. acanthostoma a form of E. troschelii, leaving the species with three forms including the nominate.

== Description ==
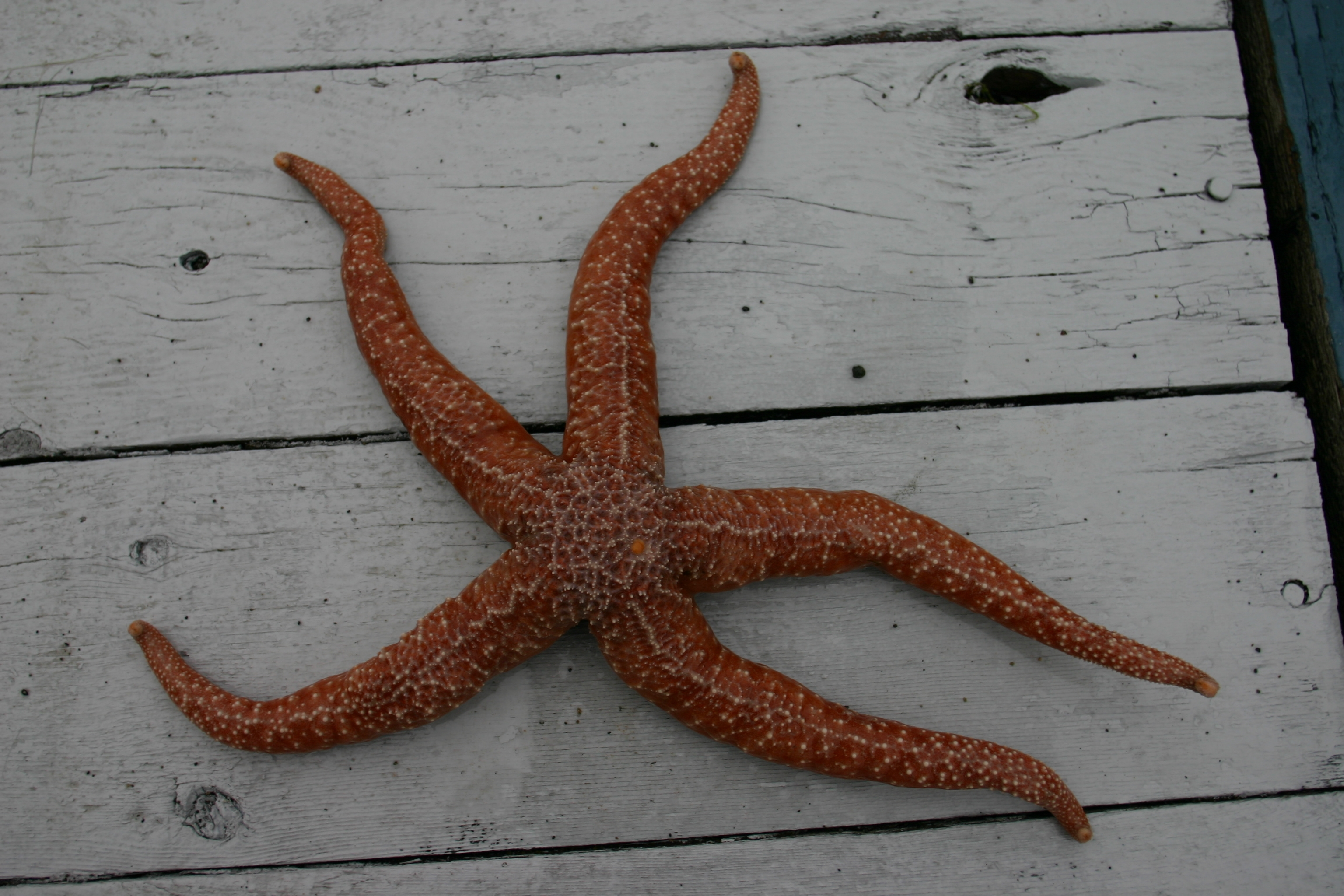
Evasterias troschelii (orange variant)

The mottled star is a large starfish with a radius of up to 28 centimetres (11 in). It has a small disc and five long narrow arms often turned up at the tip. The widest point of the arms is a little distance away from the edge of the disc. The aboral (upper or dorsal) surface of the disc is covered with a network of calcareous plates with spines about 2 mm (0.1 in) long surrounded by smaller spines and crossed and straight pedicellariae, minute pincer-like structures with two jaws. There is an irregular line of white-tipped spines running down the centre of the arms and the whole upper surface is rough to the touch. On the oral (lower or ventral) surface a long ambulacral groove stretches from the central mouth to the tip of each arm with four rows of tube feet and clumps of pedicellariae and spines on either side. The colour is very variable and includes plain or mottled shades of orange, brown, greenish-grey, bluish-grey and pale purple. The outer edges of the arms often have a contrasting coloured rim and the underside is pale brown.

== Distribution and habitat ==
Evasterias troschelii is found on the west coast of North America. Its range extends from Pribilof Islands, Alaska southwards to Monterey Bay, California but it is rarely seen south of Puget Sound. It also occurs in Kamchatka (Bechevinskaya Bay). It is usually found on rocks and pebbles and occasionally on sand, at depths down to about 75 metres (246 ft) or 70 metres (230 ft). In bays and other sheltered locations it largely replaces the other common species of the area, the purple sea star (Pisaster ochraceus).

== Ecology ==
=== Breeding ===
In the north of its range, breeding takes place from April to June. Large numbers of small eggs are produced and fertilisation is external. The bipinnaria larvae that develop from these form part of the zooplankton and disperse with the currents.

=== Prey ===
The mottled star is a predator and feeds largely on bivalve molluscs. With its tube feet it can exert a powerful traction on the two valves of a mollusc shell, pulling them sufficiently far apart to insert part of its stomach through the gap. It then uses digestive enzymes to break down the mollusc's tissues before sucking them out and removing its stomach from the shell. It also consumes barnacles, chitons, gastropod molluscs, tunicates and brachiopods. Some species of limpet exhibit behavioural responses to the presence of the mottled star and are able to evade it.

Petroleum hydrocarbons, such as those released as a result of the Exxon Valdez spillage, have a greater effect on the feeding and growth of the mottled star than on one of its main prey species, the mussel Mytilus edulis. Researchers surmised that pollution of the marine environment with oil might result in the domination of the mussel in the low intertidal zone of the region.

=== Other species interactions ===
The scale worm Arctonoe fragilis is often found living on the surface or in an ambulacral groove of the mottled star as a commensal. The parasitic ciliate Orchitophrya stellarum has several hosts, one of which is the mottled star. It lives among the spines on the body and arms until the starfish is ready to breed when it moves inside its host, probably entering through a gonopore. It makes its way to the gonads of the male starfish and feeds on the sperm, effectively castrating its host.

Juvenile Alaskan king crabs (Paralithodes camtschaticus) have been observed living as commensals on the surface of the mottled star, sheltering between its arms. Adult king crabs have been reported as attacking and eating the starfish. It is also preyed on by gulls in the intertidal zone and by the morning sunstar (Solaster dawsoni) and the sunflower seastar (Pycnopodia helianthoides).
