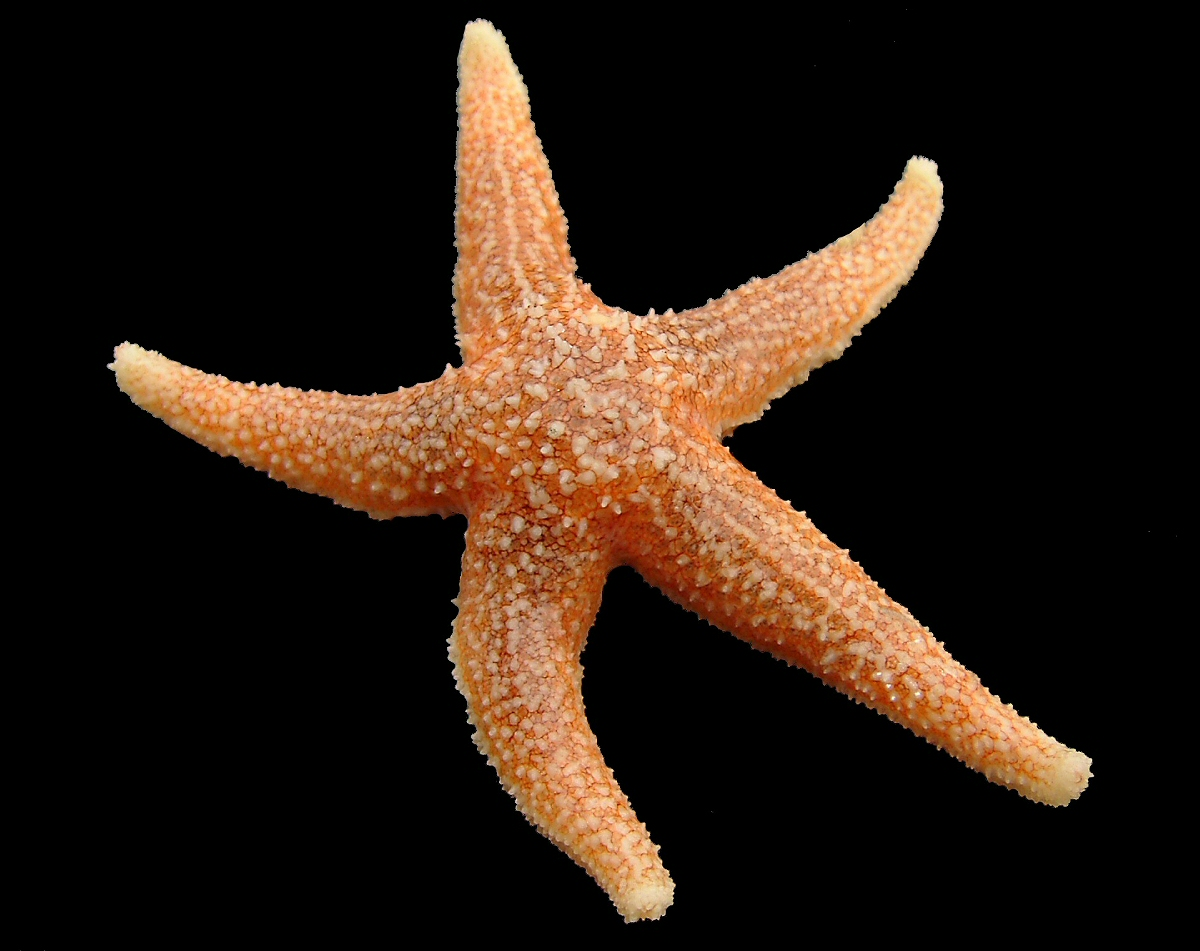

Scientific classification
- Kingdom: Animalia
- Phylum: Echinodermata
- Class: Asteroidea
- Order: Forcipulatida
- Family: Asteriidae
- Genus: Asterias
- Species: A. rubens

Binomial name
- Asterias rubens Linnaeus, 1758

Synonyms
- Asteracanthion distichum Brandt, 1851; Asteracanthion rubens Müller & Troschel, 1842; Asteracanthion violaceus Müller & Troschel, 1842; Asterias attenuata Bell, 1891; Asterias clathrata Pennant, 1777; Asterias disticha Sladen, 1889; Asterias fabricii Perrier, 1875; Asterias gigantea Bell, 1891; Asterias glacialis Pennant, 1777; Asterias holsatica Retzius, 1805; Asterias minuta Linnaeus, 1761; Asterias murrayi Bell, 1891; Asterias pallida Perrier, 1875; Asterias spinosa Say, 1825; Asterias stimpsoni Verrill, 1866; Asterias violacea O.F. Mueller, 1788; Asterias vulgaris Verrill, 1866; Stellonia rubens Nardo, 1834; Uraster rubens Forbes, 1841; Uraster violaceus Forbes, 1841

= Common starfish =

Asterias rubens

Species of starfish

The common starfish, common sea star or sugar starfish (Asterias rubens) is the most common and familiar starfish in the north-east Atlantic. Belonging to the family Asteriidae, it has five arms and usually grows to between 10–30 cm across, although larger specimens (up to 52 cm across) are known. The common starfish is usually orange or brownish in color, and sometimes violet; specimens found in deeper waters are pale. The common starfish is found on rocky and gravelly substrates where it feeds on mollusks and other benthic invertebrates.

== Description ==
The common starfish normally has five arms, broad at their base and gradually tapering to a point at their tips, which are often turned up slightly. There is a line of short white spines running along the centre of the aboral (upper) surface of the arms with low, soft mounds called papulae on either side. The oral (lower) surfaces of the arms have rows of small tube feet, used in locomotion and feeding. The starfish is usually orange or brick red on the aboral surface and paler on the oral surface but can also be purple or pale brown. Individuals from deep water are usually paler. It grows to a maximum diameter of about 52 centimetres (20 in) but a more normal size is 10 to 30 cm (4 to 12 in).

== Online model organism database ==
A. rubens is a level two supported species in the Echinobase model organism database for echinoderms.

== Distribution ==
The common starfish is native to the northeastern Atlantic Ocean and its range extends from Norway and Sweden, through the North Sea, round the coasts of Britain, France, Spain and Portugal and southwards along the coasts of Africa to Senegal. It is largely absent from the Mediterranean Sea. It is also known from the western Atlantic where it occurs between Labrador and Florida and the Gulf of Mexico. It is capable of surviving in brackish water.

== Ecology ==
The common starfish feeds on a variety of benthic organisms. These include bivalve molluscs, polychaete worms, barnacles, gastropod molluscs, other echinoderms and carrion. When feeding on a mollusc such as a mussel, it attaches its tube feet to each shell valve and exerts force to separate them slightly. Even a gap of just 1 mm (0.04 in) is sufficient for the starfish to insert a fold of its stomach, secrete enzymes and start digesting the mollusc body. When the contents are sufficiently liquid, it brings its stomach back to its rightful position with the food inside. The common starfish has a well-developed sense of smell and can detect the odour of prey species such as the common mussel (Mytilus edulis) and crawl towards it. It can also detect the odour of the predatory common sunstar (Crossaster papposus), which eats other starfish, and take evasive action.

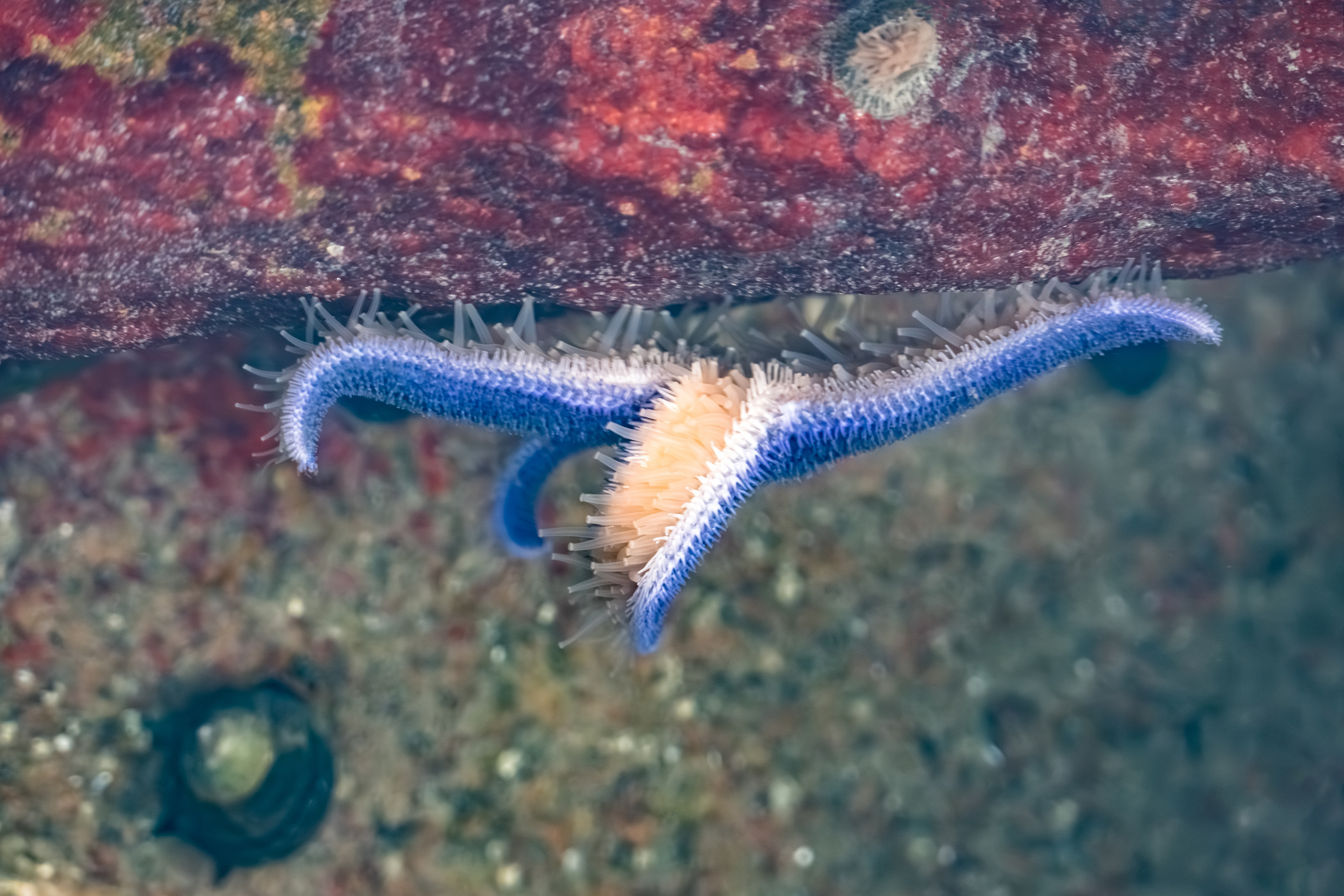
Purple common starfish in Brofjorden, Sweden

The common starfish is dioecious, which means that each individual is either male or female. In the spring, the females release their eggs into the sea. A moderate sized starfish is estimated to be able to produce 2.5 million eggs. The males shed their sperm and fertilisation takes place in the water column. The larvae are planktonic and drift for about 87 days before settling on the seabed and undergoing metamorphosis into juveniles. Common starfish are believed to live for about seven to eight years. When well fed, the juveniles can increase their radius at the rate of slightly more than 10 mm (0.4 in) per month during the summer and autumn and slightly less than 5 millimetres (0.20 in) per month in the winter. An adult common starfish can survive starvation for several months although it loses weight in the process. One specimen shrank from a radius of 6 centimetres (2.4 in) to a radius of 3.8 centimetres (1.5 in) after starvation for five months.

The ciliate protozoan Orchitophrya stellarum is sometimes a parasite of the common starfish. It normally lives on the outer surface of the starfish feeding on sloughed-off epidermal tissue. It appears to become parasitic when the host starfish has ripe gonads and is a male. It enters the starfish through the gonopores, the orifices where gametes are released. There may be a pheromone that alerts it to the fact that the testes are ripe and causes it to change its behaviour. As different species of starfish breed at different times of year, Orchitophrya stellarum may move from one species to another in accordance with their reproductive cycles. In the Atlantic Ocean, it may alternate between parasitising Asterias forbesi and Asterias rubens during the spring and summer and the winter host may be Leptasterias spp.. The ciliate has been found in the testes of all these species. When inside the gonad, it phagocytoses the sperm thus rendering the starfish infertile. Researchers have found a change in the sex ratios of affected populations with fewer males than females being present with the males being consistently smaller than the females.

The common starfish produces a saponin-like substance designed to repel predators, which causes a reaction in the common whelk (Buccinum undatum), a common prey species. At dilute concentrations it caused the whelk to take evasive action and at higher concentrations it produced a series of convulsions.

== Mass strandings ==
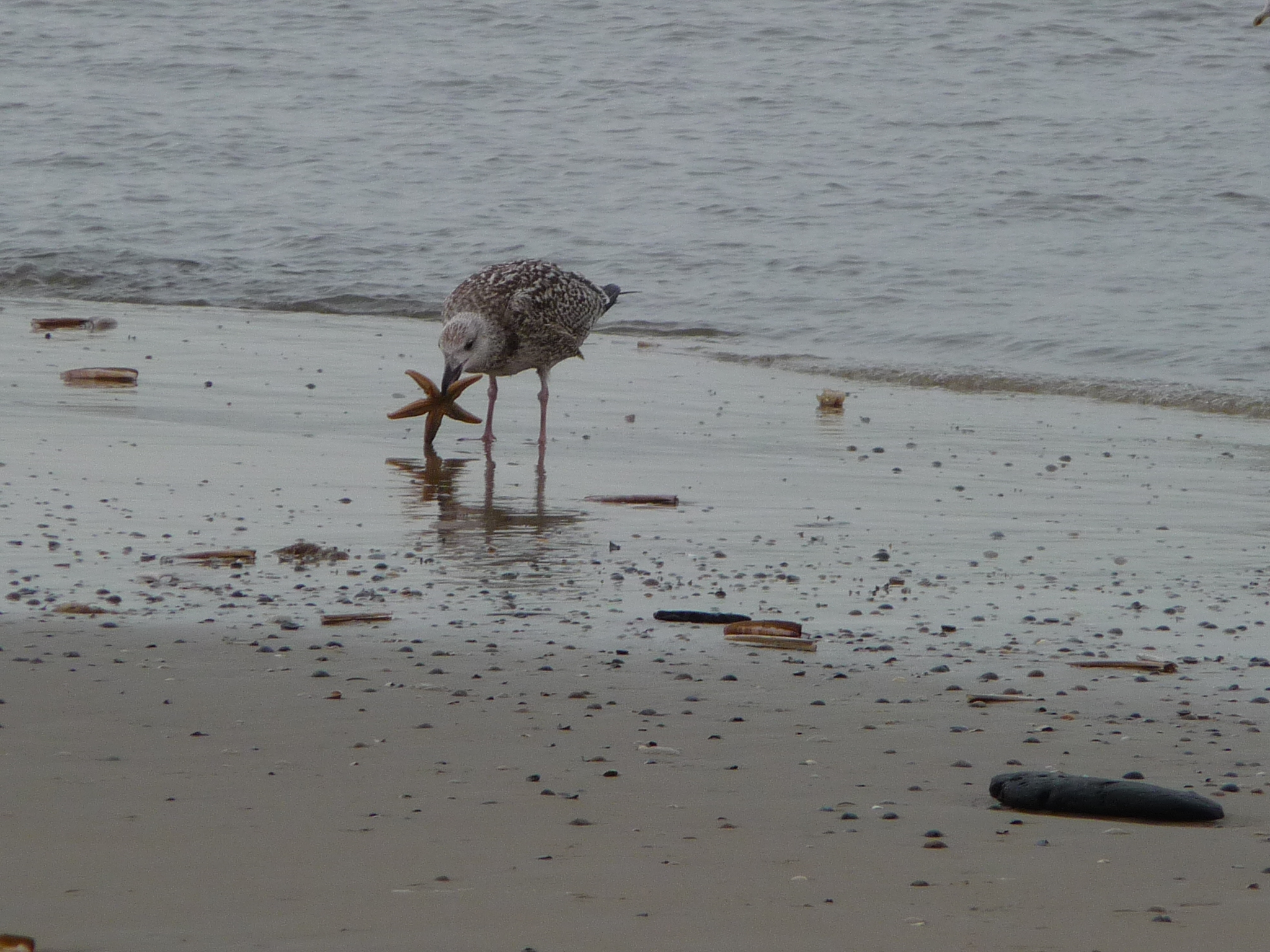
Young herring gull eating a stranded starfish

In January 2013, large numbers of common starfish were washed up near Cleethorpes Pier on the east coast of England along with many razor shells. There were estimated to be four thousand starfish along the stretch of shore. The cause of this mass stranding was unknown but bad weather and storms out at sea coupled with higher than usual tides may have been to blame.

During Storm Frank in the early hours of 31 December 2015 hundreds of starfish were stranded along the coast of Portsmouth, Hampshire.

This is not a unique phenomenon and other mass strandings have occurred in Britain and elsewhere at such places as near Sandwich in Kent in 2008, and near Brighton ten days later. A similar occurrence occurred on the shore of the White Sea where vast numbers of starfish came ashore on a nine-mile stretch of beach in 2004. It was said that people could not "walk around them because the whole shore was full of starfish". Russian experts expressed mystification as to the cause of the stranding.

== See also ==
- Asterias amurensis
