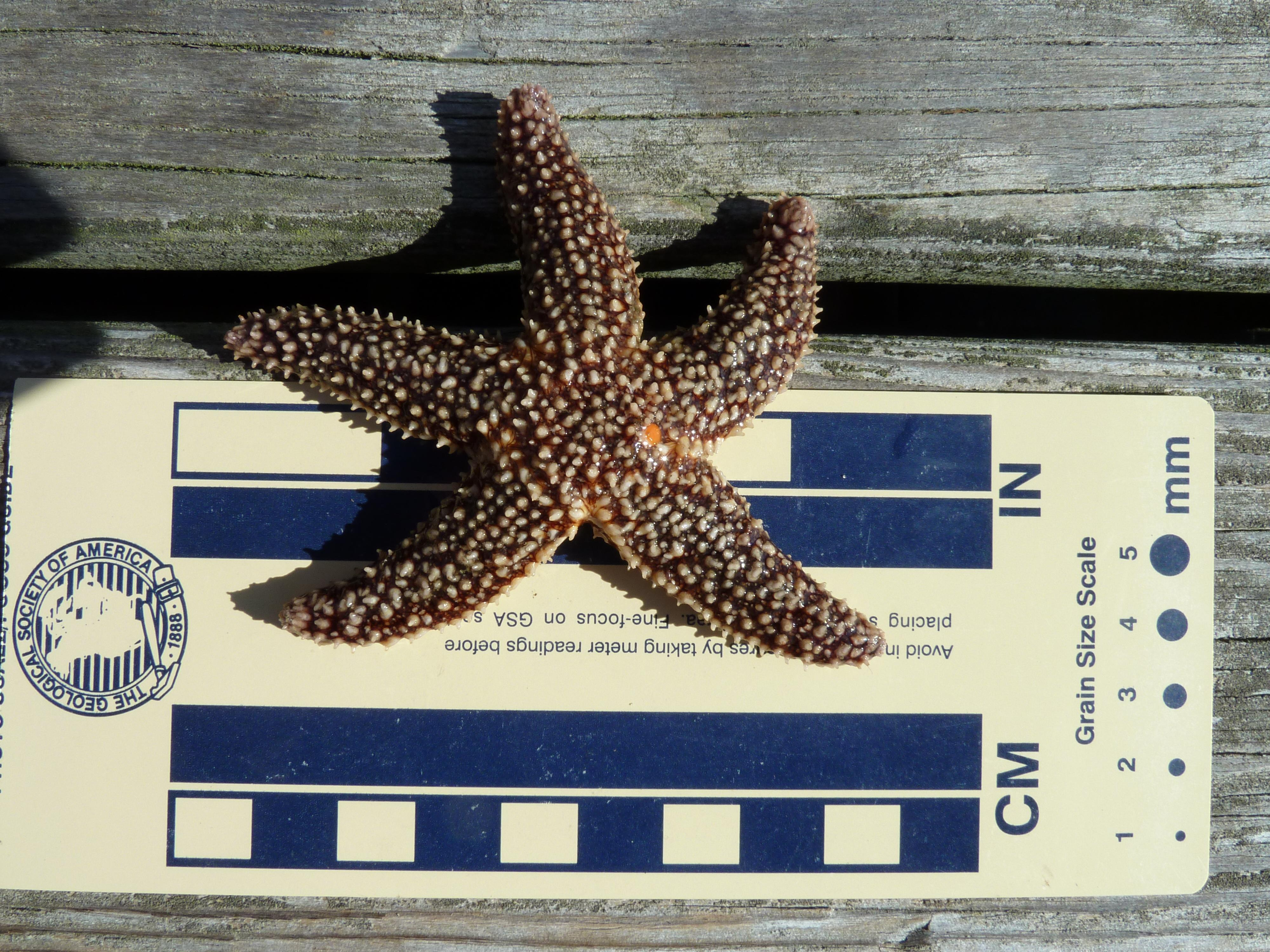

Scientific classification
- Kingdom: Animalia
- Phylum: Echinodermata
- Class: Asteroidea
- Order: Forcipulatida
- Family: Asteriidae
- Genus: Asterias
- Species: A. forbesi

Binomial name
- Asterias forbesi (Desor, 1848)

Synonyms
- Asteracanthion berylinus A. Agassiz, 1866; Asteracanthion forbesi Desor, 1848; Asteracanthion lacazei Perrier, 1869; Asteracanthion novaeboracensis Perrier, 1869; Asterias arenicola Stimpson, 1862; Asterias arenicola var. lacazei Perrier, 1875; Asterias crassispina H.L. Clark, 1941

= Asterias forbesi =

Species of starfish

Asterias forbesi, commonly known as Forbes sea star, is a species of starfish in the family Asteriidae. It is found in shallow waters in the northwest Atlantic Ocean and the Caribbean Sea.

== Description ==
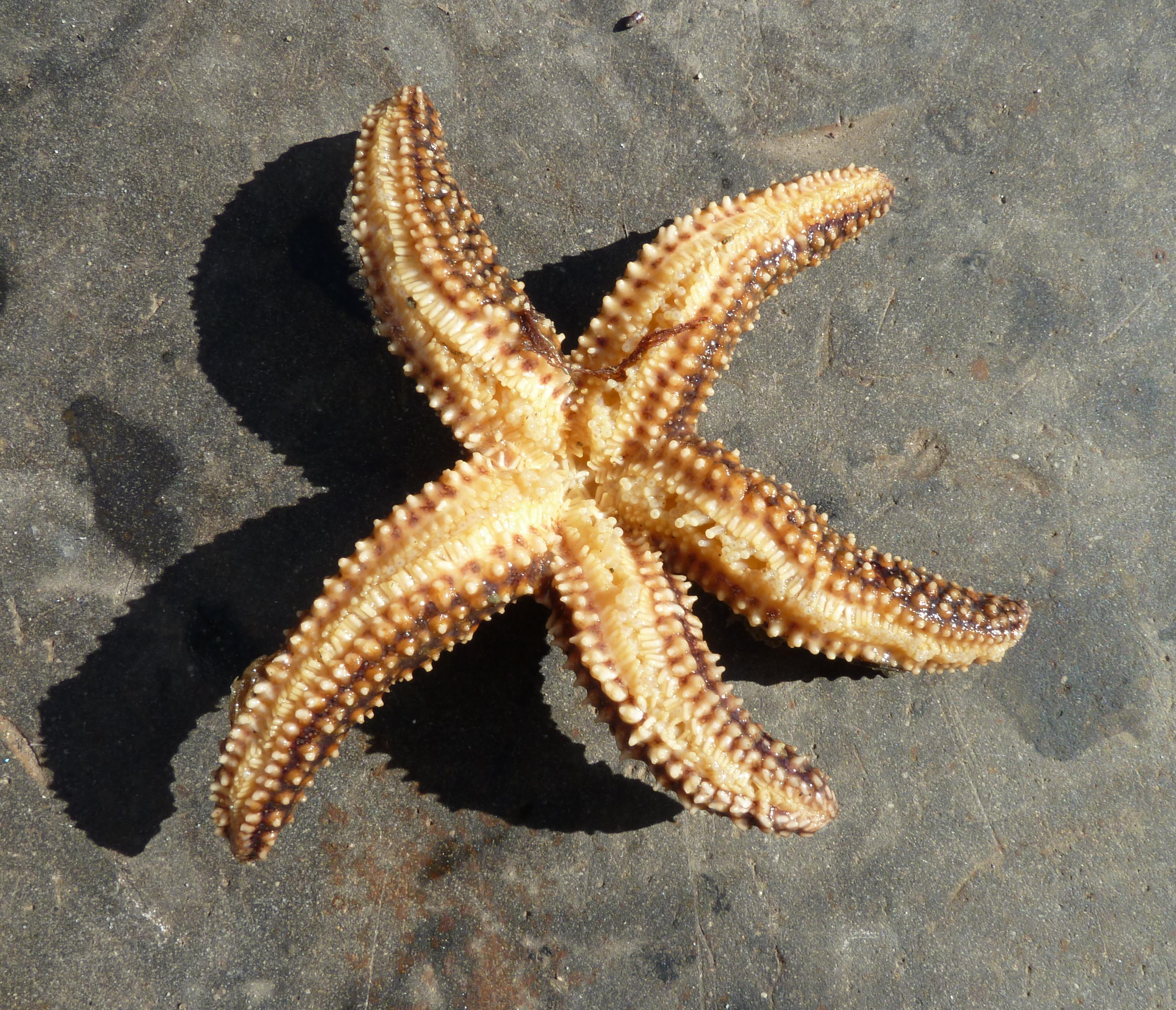
Underside of Asterias forbesi

Asterias forbesi usually has 5 arms but occasionally has 4 or 6. Like many starfish species, the upper surface is covered in blunt conical projections giving it a rough feel. Some of these are pedicellariae, minute pincers that can grip objects. The arms are plump, broad at the base and tapering to a blunt tip. This starfish grows to about 15 centimetres (5.9 in) in diameter with an arm length of about 6 centimetres (2.4 in). The madreporite is usually pink and is visible near the edge of the disc. There are several rows of tube feet on the underside on either side of the ambulacral groove that run down the centre of each arm. The colour of the upper side is variable, ranging from brown or tan to reddish-purple and the underside is usually pale brown. Near the tip on the underside of each arm there are small eyespots. These are not set on short stalks as they are in the otherwise similar Asterias rubens with which this species can be confused.

== Distribution ==
Asterias forbesi is found in the intertidal zone of rocky shores on the Atlantic coast of North America from Maine southwards to the Gulf of Mexico. This rocky habitat is beneficial to the species because it helps to prevent them from being washed away by ocean waves. Asterias rubens has a more northerly range, being found from Labrador southward to Cape Hatteras, most commonly north of Cape Cod living in colder, deeper waters.

== Behaviour ==
Asterias forbesi feeds on bivalve molluscs and other marine invertebrates. It can open shells by gripping the two halves with its tube feet and forcing them apart. It then inserts its stomach, turning it inside out in the process, and secretes enzymes, digesting the body of the mollusc in situ.

Starfish can locate their prey by chemoreception. In a trial, sixty Asterias forbesi that had not been fed for a week were used. The bait was a piece of mussel flesh in a tank of slowly circulating water. Test starfish were placed in the downstream odour plume, one metre (3 ft 3 in) away from the food source and the movements of each starfish were recorded on videotape. A control was provided using the same flow conditions but without an odour being present. 12 of the test starfish (20%) moved towards the target and got within 15 cm (6 in) of it in the allotted 15 minute timespan. The direction of movement became more accurate as the distance from the bait shortened. The rate of movement was slower than that of the control starfish and it was thought that this slower speed might improve the ability of the starfish to taste the water and make accurate comparisons of odour concentrations. None of the control starfish moved purposely in any direction, tending to move in random directions, circling and crossing their previous paths. It was proposed that more starfish would have moved towards the bait if they had previously been starved for a longer period. Other similar trials have involved starving starfish for two months prior to the experiment and this provides greater motivation to seek prey.

The sexes are separate in Asterias forbesi. Sperm and eggs are liberated into the sea and fertilization is external. The starfish in any area may synchronise their emission of gametes which will increase the chance of fertilization taking place. The eggs hatch into bipinnaria larvae which form part of the zooplankton and develop over a period of about three weeks before settling on the seabed and undergoing metamorphosis into juvenile starfish.

== Ecology ==
The ciliate parasite Orchitophrya stellarum has been found in the gonads of up to 20% of male Asterias forbesi in Long Island Sound. They feed on the tissue of the gonad and effectively castrate their host. A small number of females were also found to contain the parasite.
