= Orchitophrya stellarum =

Scientific classification
- Domain: Eukaryota
- Clade: Sar
- Clade: Alveolata
- Phylum: Ciliophora
- Class: Oligohymenophorea
- Order: Philasterida
- Family: Orchitophryidae
- Genus: Orchitophrya
- Species: O. stellarum

Binomial name
- Orchitophrya stellarum Cépède, 1907

Species of single-celled organism

Orchitophrya stellarum is a species of single-celled marine ciliates, a member of the class Oligohymenophorea. It is found living freely in the north Atlantic and Pacific Oceans but is also parasitic, being found inside the gonads of starfish.

== Biology ==
Orchitophrya stellarum tolerates a sea temperature range of between 3 °C (37 °F) and 27 °C (81 °F) and a salinity range of between 2 and at least 30 parts per thousand of salt equivalent. The lower the temperature, the lower the acceptable level of salinity. Growth is most rapid at 24 °C. It is a facultative parasite of sea stars in the Asteriidae family. It seems to be able to survive in the open sea indefinitely as long as there is a supply of bacteria and tissue detritus on which it can feed.

== Parasitism ==
Orchitophrya stellarum is often associated with sea stars and other invertebrates, living on their outer surface and feeding on sloughed-off epidermal tissue. It only appears to become parasitic when the male host starfish has ripe gonads. It probably enters the starfish through the gonopores, the orifices where gametes are released. There may be a pheromone that alerts it to the fact that the testes are ripe and causes it to change its behaviour. As different species of starfish breed at different times of year, Orchitophrya stellarum may move from one species to another in accordance with their reproductive cycles. In the Pacific Ocean, it may alternate between parasitising Evasterias troschelii and Pisaster ochraceus during the spring and summer and Leptasterias spp. in the winter. In the Atlantic Ocean, the winter host may again be Leptasterias spp. but the spring and summer hosts are likely to be Asterias forbesi and Asterias rubens. The ciliate has been found in the testes of all these species. When inside the gonad, it phagocytoses the sperm thus rendering the starfish infertile. Researchers have found skewed sex ratios of affected populations with fewer males than females being found, and males being consistently smaller than females. The researchers thought it likely that there was increased mortality among infected males.

In 2006, a mass die-off of the purple sea star (Pisaster ochraceus) occurred off the coast of British Columbia. Parasitism by Orchitophrya stellarum was considered to be the likely cause. A marine parasite expert stated that the starfish was an important member of the marine community and that if it were removed, marine biodiversity in the area would be threatened.

In a study published in 2013, Ochitophrya stellarum, the parasitic ciliate, was discovered in 2007 in the tissues of blue crabs. Hemolymph smears showed the ciliates of the parasite. This was surprising, because ochitophrya stellarum was previously only associated with infecting sea stars. This opportunistic pathogen was responsible for a number of histophagous scuticociliate infections in the blue crabs. The infections were present in the hemal sinuses of all tissues of the blue crabs and in between muscle fibers.

== Use as a biological control ==
The north Pacific sea star, Asterias amurensis, was first seen in Tasmania in 1986 and is spreading along the coasts of southern Australia. It is considered an invasive species that is threatening local biodiversity. Biological pest control of the starfish is being considered through the introduction of Orchitophrya stellarum, however its ability to regulate sea star populations is uncertain.
