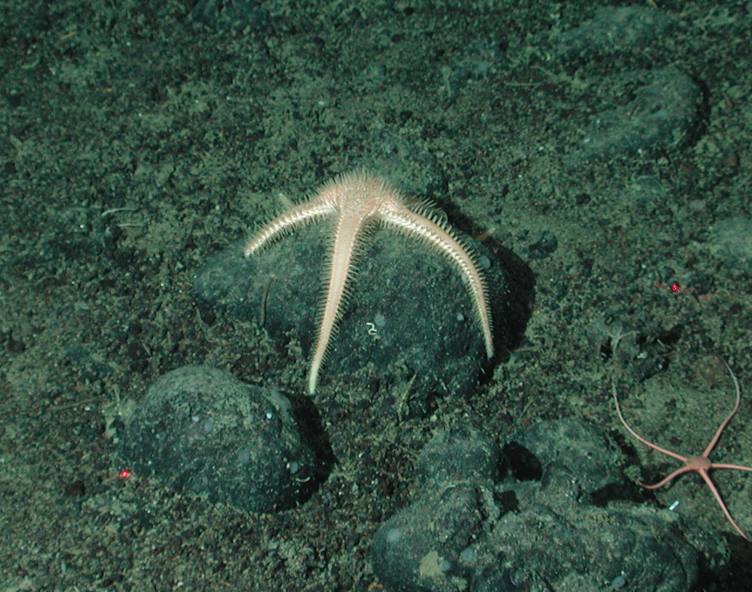
- Benthopecten species

Scientific classification
- Kingdom: Animalia
- Phylum: Echinodermata
- Class: Asteroidea
- Superorder: Valvatacea
- Order: Notomyotida; Ludwig, 1910
- Family: Benthopectinidae; Verrill, 1899

Genera
- 8, see text

Synonyms
- Benthopectininae Verrill, 1894; Cheirasteridae Ludwig, 1910; Pararchasterinae Sladen, 1889

= Benthopectinidae =

Order of starfishes

Benthopectinidae is a family of sea stars containing at least 75 species in eight genera. It is the only family in the monotypic order Notomyotida.

These asteroids are deep-sea dwelling and have flexible arms. The inner dorso-lateral surface of the arms contain characteristic longitudinal muscle bands. Eight genera of deep-water species make up the majority of the family benthopectinidae, and many of its members are expected to have a greater range than is currently recognized.

== Taxonomy ==
Nine genera are recognized:

- Acontiaster Döderlein, 1921
- Benthopecten Verrill, 1884
- Cheiraster Studer, 1883
- Gaussaster Ludwig, 1910
- Myonotus Fisher, 1911
- Nearchaster Fisher, 1911
- Pectinaster Perrier, 1885
- † Plesiastropecten Peyer, 1944
- Pontaster Sladen, 1885
