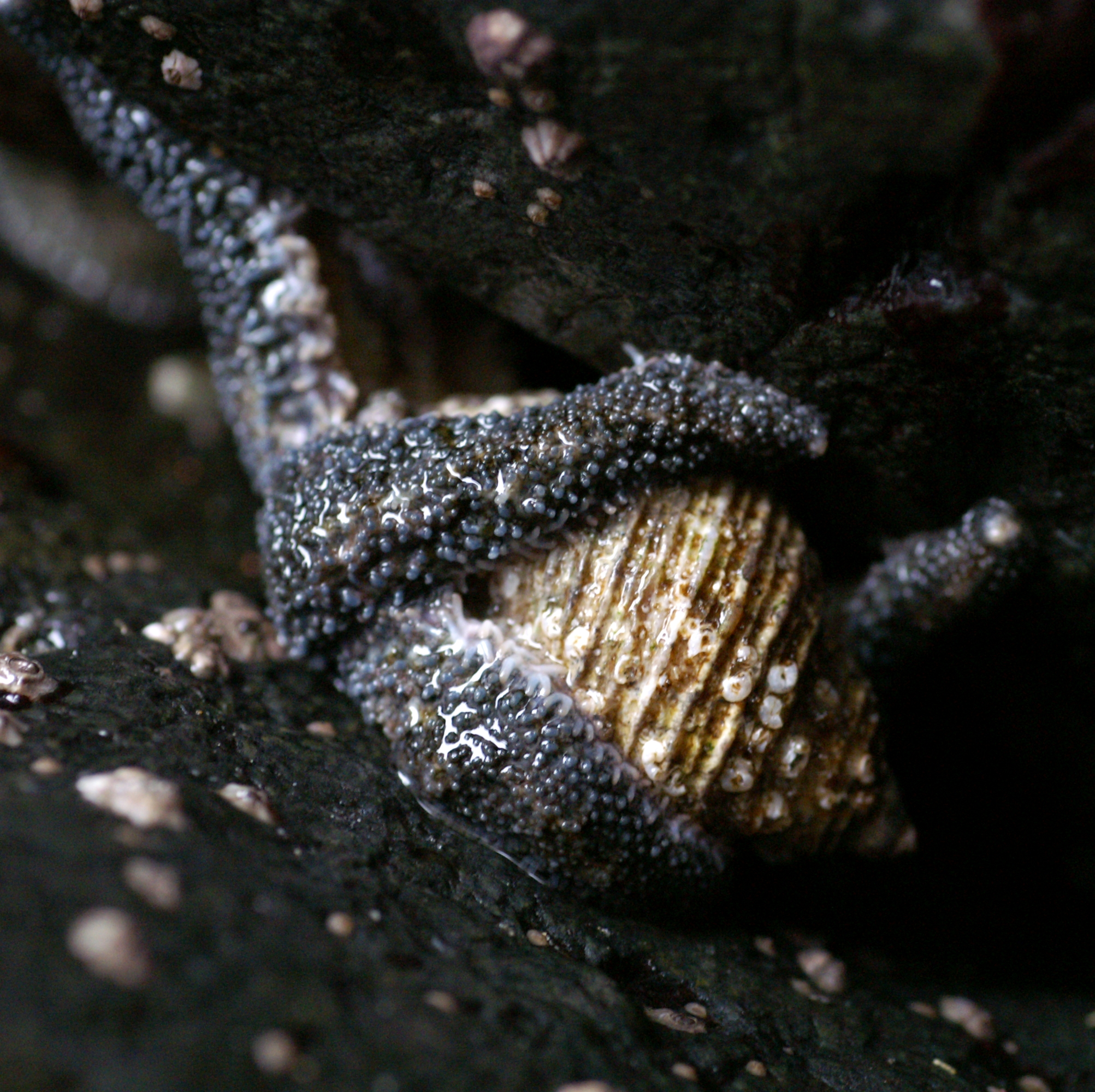
- The whelk Nucella lima being attacked by Leptasterias hexactis

Scientific classification
- Kingdom: Animalia
- Phylum: Echinodermata
- Class: Asteroidea
- Order: Forcipulatida
- Family: Asteriidae
- Genus: Leptasterias; Verrill, 1866

Species
- See text

= Leptasterias =

Genus of starfishes

Leptasterias is a genus of starfish in the family Asteriidae. Members of this genus are characterised by having six arms although five-armed specimens sometimes occur. L. muelleri is the type species. The taxonomy of the genus is confusing and Leptasterias hexactis seems to be a species complex. Some species brood their eggs.

== Description and biology ==
Leptasterias is a genus of starfish in the family Asteriidae and order Forcipulatida. It is often noted that members in the genus have six arms, however, occasionally five-armed specimen can occur. They are also characterized by having several cryptic species complexes. They are often found in the waters of Alaska to central California in rocky intertidal and subtidal habitats. They are typically small in size, measuring less than 6 cm from ray tip to ray tip. They mature around the age of two. They are known for being lecithotrophic, providing the embryo with no nutrition other than the yolk in its egg. The females will brood their young under their rays until they have fully developed and are capable of crawling away. Because of the way they are bred and the fact that they are smaller creatures, it is difficult for the sea stars to disperse to new areas. Rather than crawling long distances, the sea stars will attach to macroalgae or other floating organisms and substrate, allowing them to be dispersed farther distances. However, this method of dispersal does not happen frequently. Leptasterias can also be used as an indicator species as they are not very able to move far from their habitat and are susceptible to local selection pressures like algal blooms and disease outbreaks. To do this, it is important to identify the certain species of Leptasterias in order to accurately observe changing distributions, abundances, and population health. The cryptic complexes also play a part in determining data for monitoring ecological effects of disastrous events and other environmental stressors.

== Habitat ==
Leptasterias are found in intertidal waters. They spend their time under rocks or in rock pools where the shore is fairly exposed. Leptasterias can typically be found under rocks during the fall months. During this time, the starfish will reproduce and the rock exterior provides protection for the new brood. During the spring months is when Leptasterias can be found in the rock pools, on the surface of rocks. The rocks that Leptasterias inhabit are covered in algae which also protect the starfish as the algae remains moist and allows the starfish to avoid dehydration. Young are found in the rocky substrates in the shallow water while adults usually venture out to greater depths. They can withstand depths up to 800 meters and can be found globally in the North Sea below Norway, the North Atlantic between Iceland and Greenland, and the northeast coast and Pacific coast of The United States.

== Reproduction ==
The reproduction period for Leptasterias begins around the months of October or November and lasts until January. During this time, it is important for the starfish to be beneath rocks due to the possibility of the tide to disperse the sperm elsewhere. Leptasterias do not partake in actual sexual intercourse, but it is essential for the starfish to be in close proximity of each other to better ensure reproductive success. The males ten gonads release sperm that settles on the bottom, beneath the rock. The male spawning period lasts for about 2 hours in order to ensure there are viable sperm present for the female eggs. Females begin releasing eggs through their ten genital papillae. The eggs come out yellow and yolky at a rate of approximately one egg per minute. Once in contact with the sperm, the female then takes the eggs with her tube feet and forms a brood pouch by arching her arms to provide a protective space to place her eggs. Leptasterias do not go through a larval stage. Instead, the embryos develop and leave the mother after the first three pairs of tube feet have appeared. The mother usually protects her young for five to six months.

== Species ==
The World Register of Marine Species lists the following species:

- Subgenus Leptasterias (Hexasterias) Fisher, 1930
  - Leptasterias alaskensis (Verrill, 1909)
  - Leptasterias camtschatica (Brandt, 1835)
  - Leptasterias coei Verrill, 1914
  - Leptasterias leptodoma Fisher, 1930
  - Leptasterias polaris (Müller & Troschel, 1842)
  - Leptasterias polymorpha Djakonov, 1938
  - Leptasterias schmidti Djakonov, 1938
- Subgenus Leptasterias (Leptasterias) Verrill, 1866
  - Leptasterias muelleri (M. Sars, 1846)
- Unallocated
  - Leptasterias aequalis (Stimpson, 1862)
  - Leptasterias aleutica Fisher, 1930
  - Leptasterias arctica (Murdoch, 1885)
  - Leptasterias asteira Fisher, 1930
  - Leptasterias austera (Verrill, 1895)
  - Leptasterias canuti Heding, 1936
  - Leptasterias clavispina Heding, 1936
  - Leptasterias compta (Stimpson, 1862)
  - Leptasterias danica (Levinsen, 1887)
  - Leptasterias degerboelli Heding, 1935
  - Leptasterias derbeki Djakonov, 1938
  - Leptasterias derjungini Djakonov, 1938
  - Leptasterias fisheri Djakonov, 1929
  - Leptasterias floccosa (Levinsen, 1887)
  - Leptasterias granulata Djakonov, 1938
  - Leptasterias groenlandica (Steenstrup, 1857)
  - Leptasterias hexactis (Stimpson, 1862)
  - Leptasterias hirsuta Djakonov, 1938
  - Leptasterias hispida (Forbes, 1840)
  - Leptasterias hispidella Verrill, 1895
  - Leptasterias hylodes Fisher, 1930
  - Leptasterias hyperborea (Danielssen & Koren, 1882)
  - Leptasterias insolens Djakonov, 1938
  - Leptasterias kussakini Baranova, 1962
  - Leptasterias leptalea Verrill, 1914
  - Leptasterias littoralis (Stimpson, 1853)
  - Leptasterias mexicana (Lutken, 1860) (nomen dubium)
  - Leptasterias ochotensis (Brandt, 1851)
  - Leptasterias orientalis Djakonov, 1929
  - Leptasterias pusilla Fisher, 1930
  - Leptasterias siberica Djakonov, 1930
  - Leptasterias similispinis (H.L. Clark, 1908)
  - Leptasterias squamulata Djakonov, 1938
  - Leptasterias stolacantha Fisher, 1930
  - Leptasterias subarctica Djakonov, 1938
  - Leptasterias tatei Clark & Jewett, 2015
  - Leptasterias tenera (Stimpson, 1862)
  - Leptasterias vinogradovi Djakonov, 1938
