= Inlandia Institute =

Inlandia Institute Logo

The Inlandia Institute is a literary and cultural organization based in Riverside, California whose mission "is to recognize, support and expand literary activity in the Inland Empire, thereby deepening people’s awareness, understanding, and appreciation of this unique, complex and creatively vibrant area." Inlandia started as a joint project of the Riverside Public Library and Heyday Books in 2007 and was formally established as an independent non-profit organization in June 2009.

Marion Mitchell-Wilson served as its Executive Director from its inception until 2012 when she stepped down for health reasons. Cati Porter, acclaimed Riverside poet and editor, became Executive Director of the Inlandia Institute after Mitchell-Wilson's departure.

== History ==
The Inlandia Institute began as a result of the anthology Inlandia: A Literary Journey Through California's Inland Empire published by Heyday Books in 2006. The positive response to the book - which provided the Inland Empire its first cohesive literary identity by bringing together in one literary endeavor a selection of the diverse communities that comprise the region - made it clear that there was a demand for more literary content from and about the Inland Empire. Shortly after the publication of the anthology, Malcolm Margolin, founder and owner of Heyday Books, began receiving numerous requests for more literary content produced by area residents.

After a book launch event in Palm Desert, Margolin and Mitchell-Wilson met with Riverside Public Library director Barbara Custen to discuss ways to build upon the success of the book. It was Custen who coined the term "Inlandia Institute".

The City of Riverside and Heyday Books entered into a Memorandum of Understanding to establish the Inlandia Institute in August 2007. The Institute incorporated as an independent non-profit organization in 2009, at which point it moved out of the Riverside Public Library to its current space in downtown Riverside.

Inlandia has been hosting the Inlandia Creative Writing Showcase since 2008.

== Literary Prizes ==
Inlandia offers a variety of literary prizes, with awardees receiving $1000 and publication of their manuscripts. (Other promising manuscripts may also be offered publication.)

Since 2015, Inlandia Institute has awarded two annual prizes for books of poetry in honor of Hillary Gravendyk (1979-2014), "a beloved poet living and teaching in Southern California’s 'Inland Empire' region." Recipients of the Hillary Gravendyk Poetry Prize include:

Recipients of the Hillary Gravendyk Prize in Poetry arranged by year and regional/national winners (where available, author websites are cited)
	HILLARY GRAVENDYK PRIZE (Poetry - Regional)	HILLARY GRAVENDYK PRIZE (Poetry - National)
2015	All Things Lost Thousands of Times, Angela Peñaredondo	Map of an Onion, Kenji C Liu
2016	God’s Will for Monsters, Rachelle Cruz	Traces of a Fifth Column, Marco Maisto
2017		Our Bruises Kept Singing Purple, Malcolm Friend
2018	All the Emergency-Type Structures, Elizabeth Cantwell	Former Possessions of the Spanish Empire, Michelle Peñaloza
2019	Remyth: A Postmodernist Ritual, Adam Martinez	The Silk the Moths Ignore, Bronwen Tate
2020	This Side of the Fire, Jonathan Maule	among the enemies, Michael Samra
2021	Our Lady of Perpetual Desert, Alexandra Martinez	How to Know You’re Dreaming When You’re Dreaming, Angelica Maria Barraza
2022	Bones Awaiting the Blaze, Tiffany Elliott	The Artemisia, Will Barnes
2023	tba	tba

Inlandia has also offered an annual prize in prose since 2020. The Eliud Martínez Prize "was established to honor the memory of Eliud Martínez (1935–2020), artist, novelist, and professor emeritus of creative writing at the University of California, Riverside." This prize is available to authors who identify as Hispanic, Latino/a/x, or Chicana/o/x. Recipients of the Eliud Martínez Prose Prize include:

Recipients of the Eliud Martínez Prize in Prose arranged by year
	Eliud Martínez Prize (Prose)
2021	Guajira, the Cuba Girl–a memoir, Zita Arocha
2022	tba

== List of Books ==
- Rose Hill: An Intermarriage before Its Time / Carlos Cortés ISBN 978-1-59714-188-8
- Flora of the Santa Ana River and Environs: With References to World Botany / Oscar F. Clarke ISBN 978-1-59714-050-8
- Two Chilies Dos Chiles / by Julianna Maya Cruz ISBN 978-0983957508
- Inlandia: A Literary Journey
- Vital Signs / Poetry by Juan Delgado; Photography by Thomas McGovern ISBN 978-1-59714-250-2
- 2011 Writing from Inlandia / Inlandia Institute ISBN 978-0983957515
- 2012 Writing from Inlandia / Inlandia Institute ISBN 978-0983957522
- Backyard Birds of the Inland Empire / Sheila N. Kee ISBN 978-1-59714-132-1
- Dream Street / Douglas McCulloh; foreword by D. J. Waldie ISBN 978-1-59714-103-1
- No Place for a Puritan: The Literature of California’s Deserts / Edited by Ruth Nolan ISBN 978-1-59714-098-0
