= Leptasterias pusilla =

Scientific classification
- Kingdom: Animalia
- Phylum: Echinodermata
- Class: Asteroidea
- Order: Forcipulatida
- Family: Asteriidae
- Genus: Leptasterias
- Species: L. pusilla

Binomial name
- Leptasterias pusilla (Fisher, 1930)

Small, six-rayed sea starfish

Leptasterias pusilla is a species that belongs to the Leptasterias genus group and is commonly known as a small, six-rayed sea star. Some scientists also call this species "L. aequalis D", but this name is currently debatable due to taxonomy complexity. Leptasterias pusilla used to be a prevalent species along the California coastline; it's especially concentrated in the San Francisco Bay Area. However, due to various reasons, such as Invertebrate mass mortality on rocky coasts, and Sea Star Wasting Disease (SSWD) in the year of 2013, the population of the Leptasterias pusilla had declined significantly.

== Description ==
"A dainty little six-rayed seastar with a total arm spread usually under 2 cm." The primary feature of Leptasterias pusilla is its small size (less than 2 cm); however, it is frequently mistaken for Leptasterias hexactis in California.

=== Taxonomy uncertainty ===
There is an argument that the traditional taxonomy method might not be suitable for the Leptasterias genus species due to its species complex and hybridization. According to DNA extraction and molecular research performed on Leptasterias, there may be a novel approach to better categorize this species and define the genus's boundaries.

== Distribution ==
"The genus Leptasterias originates in the Arctic," and within the United States, this species can be found in the middle intertidal zone of the rocky shores of central California, including San Mateo, Santa Cruz, and Monterey counties. Leptasterias pusilla is "...generally believed to be the most abundant species in the subgenus [Hexasterias] along the North American Pacific coast from central California to southern Alaska."

=== Local devastation of species ===
Smaller creatures are more vulnerable to environmental changes and are less visible due to their size. As a result, Leptasterias pusilla became locally extinct in some regions before people could take preventive action. Sea Star Wasting Disease is a virus that causes the arms of the starfish to fall off and eventually melt down and die. The disease broke out around 2013 and affected all starfish, including those of the Leptasterias genus on the West Coast. San Francisco Bay has turned from starfish abundant to no starfish to be observed in the area for several years. However, this is not the only reason for the significant decline in the Leptasterias pusilla.

In August 2011, mass deaths of invertebrates, including ochre sea star, purple sea urchins, and Leptasterias spp., were documented along the California Pacific Coast. The most likely explanation was thought to be a poison generated by phytoplankton.

As climate change intensifies, marine ecosystems are severely impacted by rising temperatures, unstable salinity, and worsening urban pollution. In 2020, the Bay Nature reported that "... researchers scoured the beaches around the San Francisco Bay outflow, including Rodeo, Muir, Slide Ranch, Point Bonita and Duxbury Reef. They found not one Leptasterias pusilla."

== Behavior ==
Leptasterias pusilla may be quite numerous in the middle intertidal zone of rocky shores, typically moving around on the top of rocks at night after hiding under them during the day.

=== Diet ===
Poikilotherms primarily feed on small gastropods, with only minimal metabolic rate fluctuations in response to changes in ambient temperature.

=== Reproduction ===
The Leptasterias pusilla "...breeding habits are famous." The mother keeps the eggs and larvae in brood clusters around her mouth area until the larvae reach adult form. "Ovigerous females may be found in January and February, with the minute offspring seen in tide pools during February and March."

== See also ==
- Linckia laevigata
