= Larry L. Meyer =

American journalist and academic

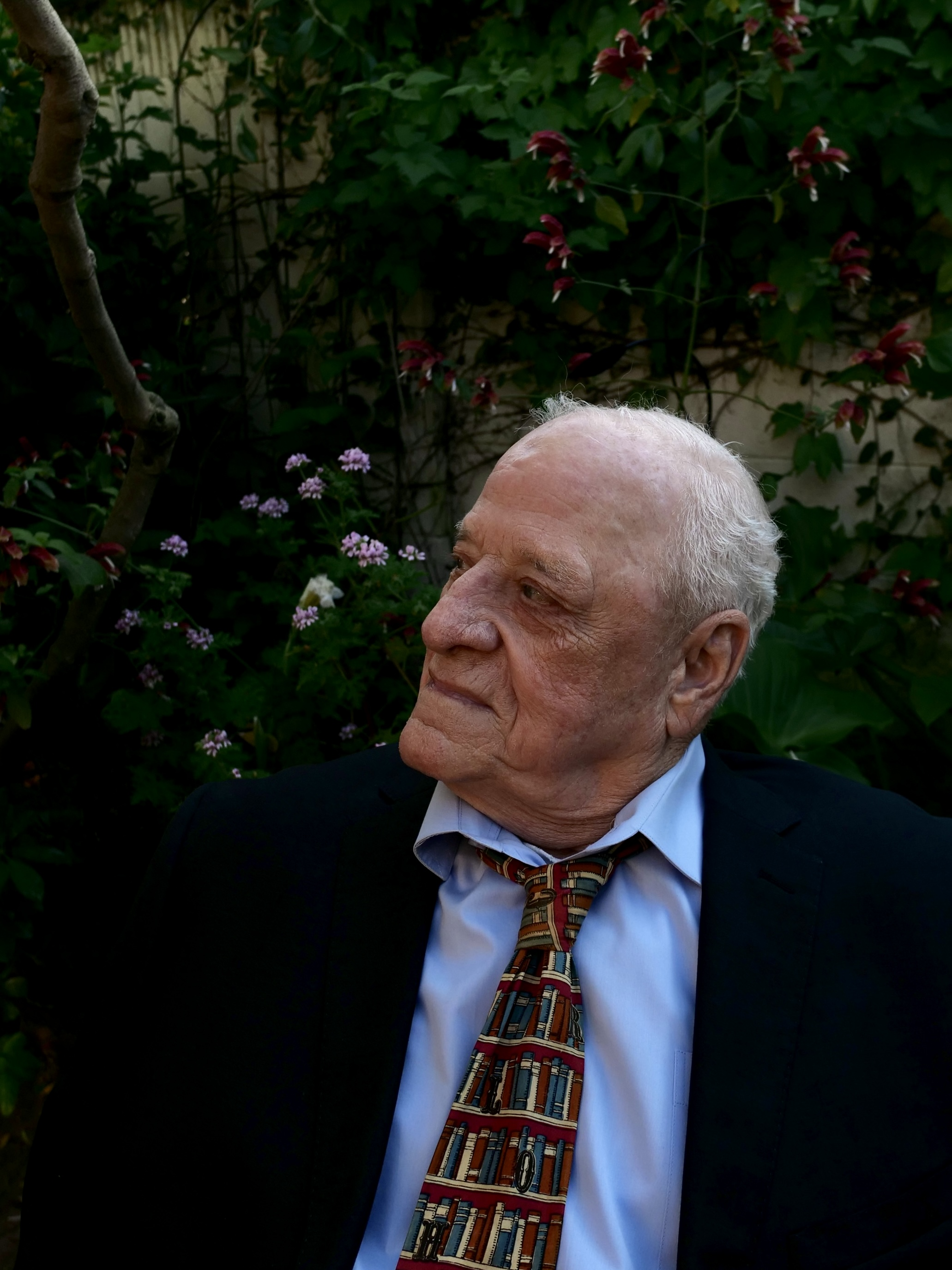
- Meyer in his garden, 2023
- Education: University of California, Los Angeles
- Occupations: Journalist, author, writer, educator
- Children: 6
- Website: www.larrylmeyer.com

Larry L. Meyer is an American journalist, author and academic. He is the former editor-in-chief of Westways, the magazine of the Automobile Club of Southern California, and a professor emeritus of journalism at California State University, Long Beach. He is a 1959 cum laude graduate of the University of California, Los Angeles (UCLA), where he was president of his graduate class, and earned a master's degree in journalism at UCLA in 1960.

Meyer is a longtime resident of Huntington Beach, California. In the early 1980s, divorced from a 21-year marriage, Meyer married one of his journalism students. After two children with her and in his late 50s, he retired from teaching to become a stay-at-home father to an unexpected sixth child and to support his wife's career. These experiences became the basis for two of his books, My Summer With Molly and No Paltry Thing, both self-published through a small publishing company he founded, Calafia Press.

== Bibliography ==
Meyer's books include:

- Meyer, Larry L. (1975). Shadow of a Continent: The Prize That Lay to the West, 1776. American West Publishing Co. ISBN 0910118620.
- —— (1977). California Quake. Sherbourne Press. ISBN 0820201340.
- ——; Kalayjian, Patricia L. (1983). Long Beach: Fortune's Harbor. Continental Heritage Press. ISBN 0932986374.
- —— (1987). The Complete Works of Marcus Uteris: A Novel. Calafia Press. ISBN 0942273036.
- —— (1989). My Summer With Molly: The Journal of a Second Generation Father. Calafia Press. ISBN 0942273044.
- —— (2005). No Paltry Thing: Memoirs of a Geezer Dad. Calafia Press. ISBN 0942273052.
- Jurmain, Claudia; Lavender, David; —— (2011). Rancho Los Alamitos: Ever Changing, Always the Same. Heyday. ISBN 978-1597141482.
