= Thyca sagamiensis =

Scientific classification
- Kingdom: Animalia
- Phylum: Mollusca
- Class: Gastropoda
- Subclass: Caenogastropoda
- Order: Littorinimorpha
- Family: Eulimidae
- Genus: Thyca
- Species: T. sagamiensis

Binomial name
- Thyca sagamiensis (Kuroda & Habe, 1971)

Synonyms
- Kiramodulus sagamiensis Kuroda & Habe, 1971

Species of gastropod

Thyca sagamiensis is a species of sea snail, a marine gastropod mollusk in the family Eulimidae. The species is one of a number within the genus Thyca.
