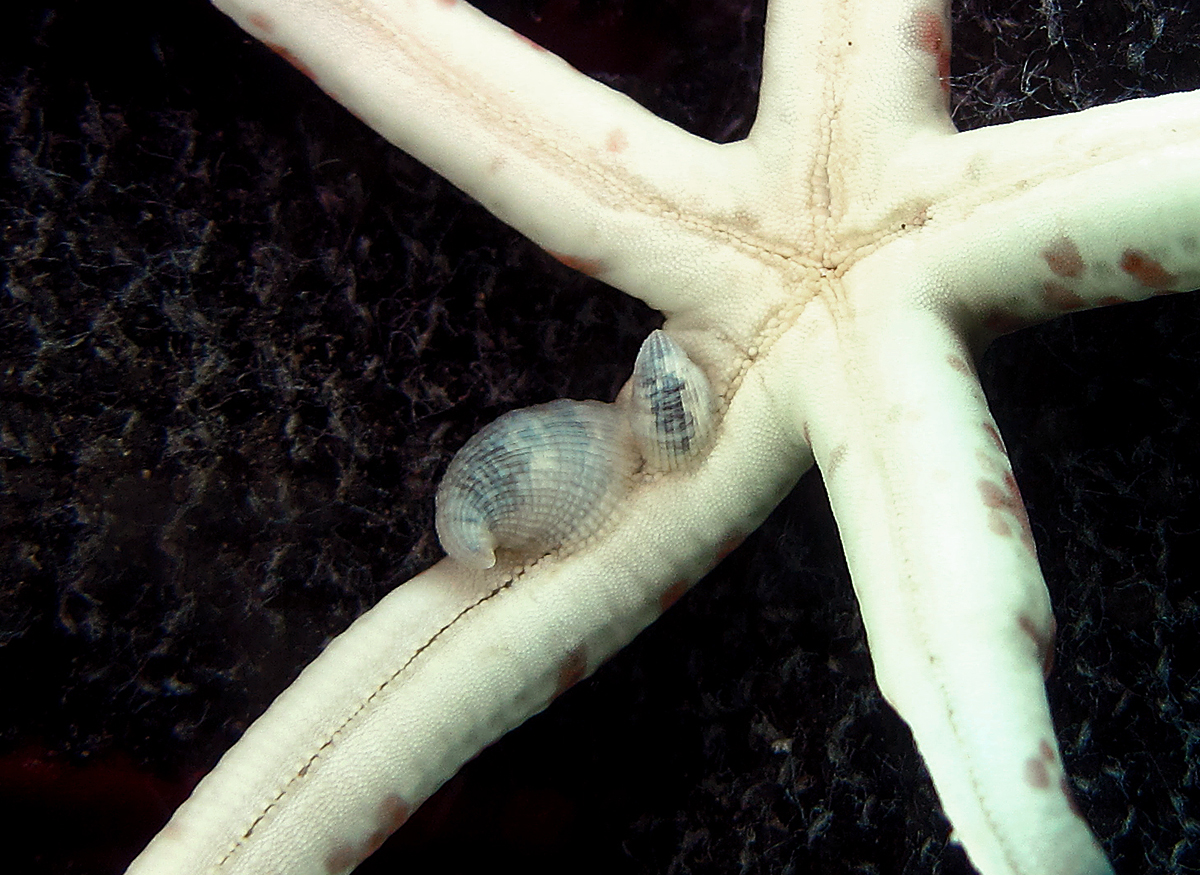
- Thyca ectoconcha crawling on the starfish Linckia multifora

Scientific classification
- Kingdom: Animalia
- Phylum: Mollusca
- Class: Gastropoda
- Subclass: Caenogastropoda
- Order: Littorinimorpha
- Family: Eulimidae
- Genus: Thyca
- Species: T. ectoconcha

Binomial name
- Thyca ectoconcha P. Sarasin & F. Sarasin, 1887

Synonyms
- Thyca (Bessomia) ectoconcha P. Sarasin & F. Sarasin, 1887

= Thyca ectoconcha =

Species of gastropod

Thyca ectoconcha is a species of sea snail, a marine gastropod mollusk in the family Eulimidae. The species is one of a number within the genus Thyca.
