= Riverside Public Library =

Public library in Riverside, California, U.S.

Coordinates: 33.9825°N 117.3716°W

- The main branch of the Riverside Public Library.
- Location: Main Library: 3900 Mission Inn Ave, Riverside, California, United States
- Type: Public
- Established: 1888
- Branches: 8

Access and use
- Population served: 317,261

Other information
- Director: Erin Christmas
- Website: Riverside Public Library

The Riverside Public Library system serves the city of Riverside, California. The main library is located in the downtown area at 3900 Mission Inn Avenue. Seven other branches are located throughout the city.

== History ==
On July 9, 1888, the Riverside City Board of Trustees assumed responsibility for the book collection of The Riverside Library Association, was formed in 1879; the City took responsibility for the collection in 1888, and appointed a committee to oversee the establishment of a public library. The Riverside Public Library opened on June 1, 1889, in two upstairs rooms in the Handy Building, located on the north side of Eighth Street, between Main and Orange streets. In January 1890, the collection was moved to the second floor of the Loring Building.

On August 16, 1901, Andrew Carnegie granted Riverside $20,000 for a library building with a capacity of 20,000 volumes. Construction began in 1902, and the result was a Mission Revival building—the work of the architectural firm of Burnham and Blieser—on the northeast corner of Seventh and Orange streets. It opened to the public on 31 July 1903, it had a 20,000-volume capacity. In mid-1909, the library was expanded with another Carnegie grant—a $15,000 project that created a children's room for the first time. Further expansions saw a Reference Wing, designed by Riverside architect G. Stanley Wilson, and the purchase use of two adjacent house.

In 1961, the city voters approved a $1.7 million bond issue to construct a new downtown library building. The new library was opened to the public in 1964. It had 61,420-square-foot (5,706 m^{2}), with a 300,000 volume capacity and seating for 550 patrons; design was by the Riverside architectural firm of Moise, Harbach and Hewlett.

In October, 2009, the library's board of trustees reinitiated plans to replace the existing main library. Previous plans were scrapped after the public expressed displeasure with the approach that had been taken.

In October, 2016, the Riverside City Council approved construction of a new Main Library building at 3900 Mission Inn Avenue. The new building, designed by Johnson Favara, was completed in 2021. The old downtown library building was retrofitted for The Cheech Marin Center for Chicano Art, Culture & Industry.

=== Library Service School ===
Joseph F. Daniels, a lecturer and guest professor founded a library school in 1911, taught by himself and some library experts from other parts of the country. It began with basic classes and training projects for the library's own staff and soon after for non-staff member. The School closed in 1943.

=== Inlandia Institute ===
The Riverside Public Library created the Inlandia Institute in collaboration with Heyday Books in 2009. Its mission "is to recognize, support and expand literary activity in the Inland Empire, thereby deepening people’s awareness, understanding, and appreciation of this unique, complex and creatively vibrant area."

Marion Mitchell-Wilson, who was the Riverside Public Library's Development Officer, served as the Inlandia Institute's Executive Director from its inception until 2012 when she stepped down for health reasons.

== Branches ==
- Main Library, 3900 Mission Inn Ave
- Arlanza, 8267 Philbin Ave
- Arlington, 9556 Magnolia Ave
- Casa Blanca, 2985 Madison Ave
- Eastside, 4033-C Chicago Ave
- La Sierra, 4600 La Sierra Ave
- Marcy, 6927 Magnolia Ave
- Orange Terrace, 20010-A Orange Terrace Pky

== Vision Statement of Library ==
"To be the foremost promoter of self-directed life-long learning. We spark curiosity and provide tools for discovery."

== Library Directors ==
Mary Montague Smith 1888-1900
Grace Mansfield 1900-1905
Margaret Kyle 1905-1909
Helen Evans (Acting) 1909-1910
Joseph F. Daniels 1910-1921
Lillian Dickson (Acting) 1921-1922
Charles F. Woods 1922-1947
Albert Charles Lake 1947-1975
Catherine Lucas 1975-1979
Linda M. Wood 1980-1991
Judith Auth 1991-2005
Barbara Custen 2005-2008
Leonard Hernandez, 2008-2010
Tonya Kennon, 2011-2018
Erin Christmas, 2018-Current

== Board of Library Trustees ==
The City Council appoints nine residents to serve up to two four-year terms as trustees of the Library.

== Sources ==
- Baker, Ronald J.; Serving Through Partnership: A Centennial History of the Riverside City and County Public Library, 1888-1988
