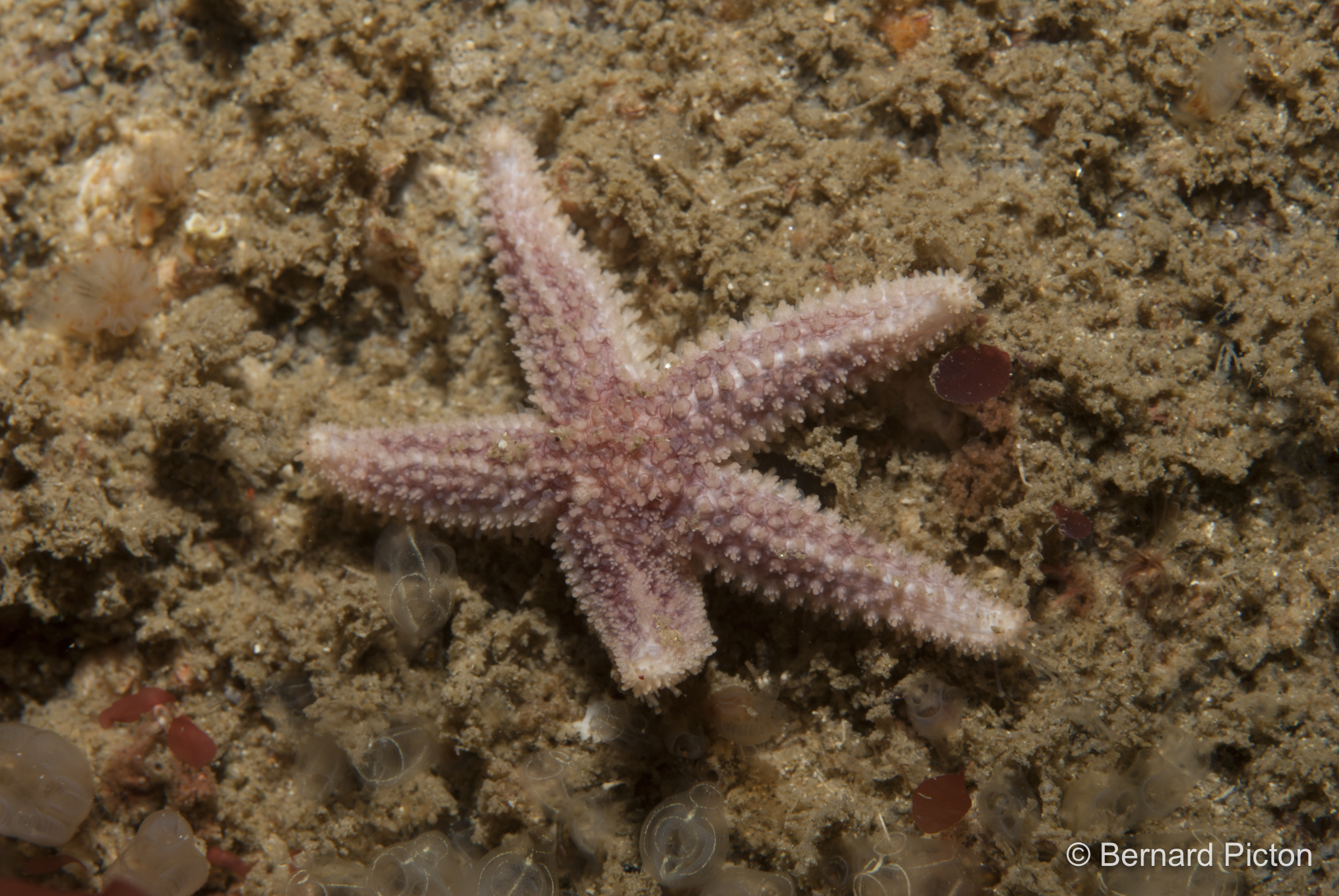

Scientific classification
- Kingdom: Animalia
- Phylum: Echinodermata
- Class: Asteroidea
- Order: Forcipulatida
- Family: Asteriidae
- Genus: Leptasterias
- Species: L. muelleri

Binomial name
- Leptasterias muelleri (M. Sars, 1846)

Synonyms
- Asteracanthion muelleri M. Sars, 1846; Asterias muelleri Norman, 1865; Asterias mülleri Norman, 1865; Stellonia hispida (Pennant, 1777)

= Leptasterias muelleri =

Species of starfish

Leptasterias muelleri, the northern starfish, is a species of starfish in the family Asteriidae. It is found in the Arctic Ocean and the northern Atlantic Ocean. It is a predator and scavenger and is unusual among starfish in that it broods its young.

== Description ==
The Leptasterias muelleri is a small starfish that is often about 5 cm (2 in) in diameter but can grow to 20 cm (8 in). It has a small disc and five broad, tapering arms that are demarcated from the disc. The aboral (upper) surface is rough, being covered with longitudinally arranged, knob-shaped spines. These are surrounded by small pedicellariae (claw-shaped structures) and interspersed by papulae (respiratory projections). The oral (under) surface of the arms has four longitudinal rows of tube feet with suckers. The colour of this starfish may be pale purple, pink, or green, with pale-coloured tips to the arms. Green individuals have a symbiotic green alga living in the tissues and are normally found living in shallow water.

== Distribution and habitat ==
Leptasterias muelleri has a wide distribution in the Arctic Ocean and northern Atlantic Ocean. Its range extends from the Gulf of Maine, Greenland, and Iceland to the Barents Sea, Scandinavia, the North Sea, and the British Isles. It occurs on the lower shore, where it hides under stones, and to depths of at least 200 m (656 ft).
