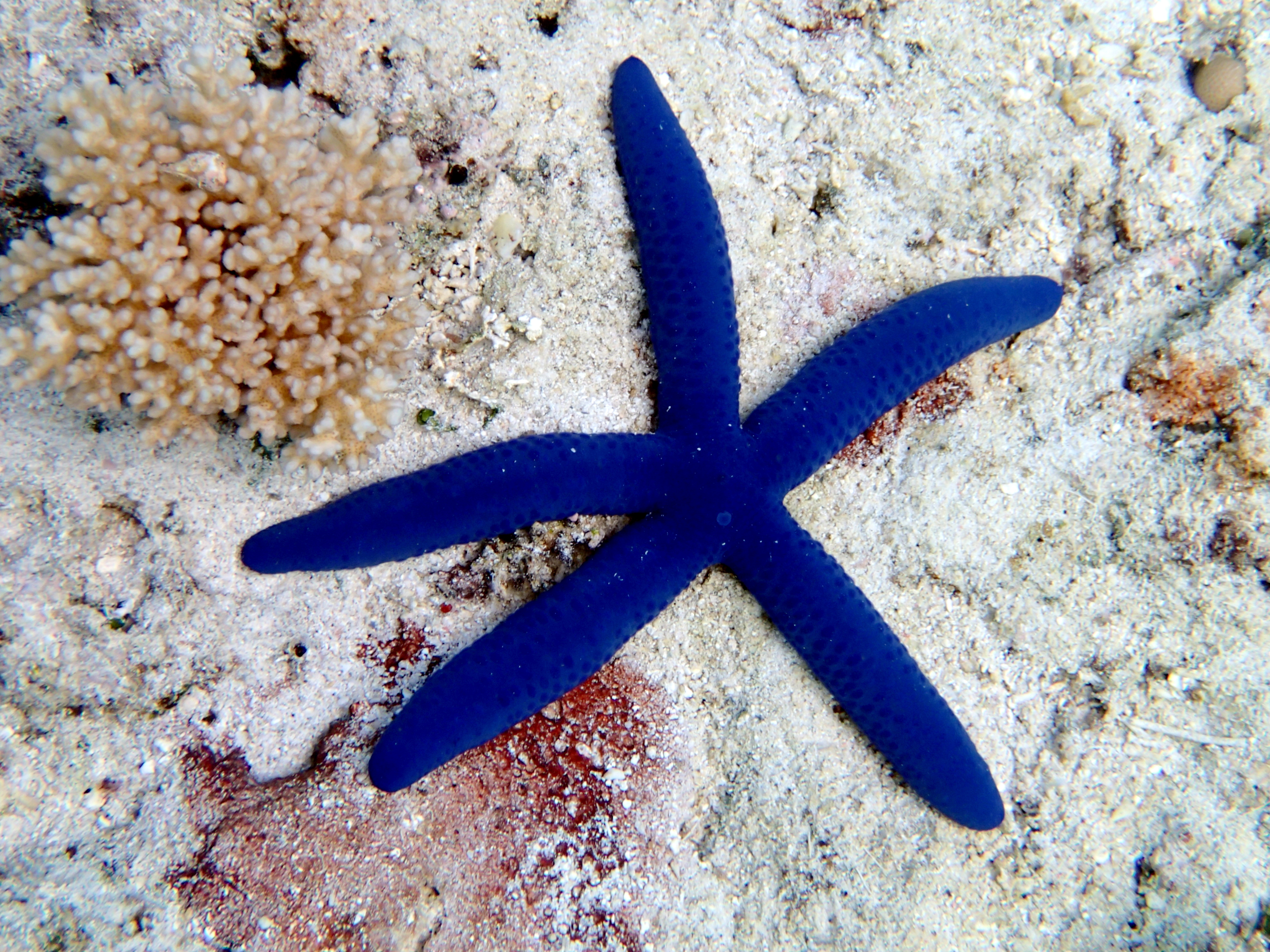

Scientific classification
- Kingdom: Animalia
- Phylum: Echinodermata
- Class: Asteroidea
- Order: Valvatida
- Family: Ophidiasteridae
- Genus: Linckia
- Species: L. laevigata

Binomial name
- Linckia laevigata (Linnaeus, 1758)

= Linckia laevigata =

Species of starfish

Linckia laevigata, sometimes called the blue Linckia, or blue star, is a species of sea star commonly found in the shallow waters of the tropical Indo-Pacific.

== Description and characteristics ==
The variation ("polymorphism", in this case, a "color morph") most commonly found is pure blue, dark blue, or light blue, although observers find the aqua, purple, or orange variation throughout the ocean. These sea stars may grow up to 30 cm (11.8 in) in diameter, with rounded tips at each of the arms; some individuals may bear lighter or darker spots along each of their arms. Individual specimens are typically firm in texture, possessing the slightly tubular, elongated arms common to most of other members of the family Ophidiasteridae, and usually possessing short, yellowish tube feet. An inhabitant of coral reefs and sea grass beds, this species is relatively common and is typically found in sparse density throughout its range. Blue stars live subtidally, or sometimes intertidally, on fine (sand) or hard substrata and move relatively slowly (mean locomotion rate of 8.1 cm/min).

The genus Linckia, as is true of other species of starfish, is recognized by scientists as being possessed of remarkable regenerative capabilities, and endowed with powers of defensive autotomy against predators: Although not yet documented, L. laevigata may be able to reproduce asexually, as does the related species Linckia multifora (another denizen of tropical seas, but of differing coloration, i.e., pink or reddish mottled with white and yellow, which has been observed reproducing asexually in captivity). Linckia multifora produces 'comets', or separated arms, from the mother individual; these offspring proceed to grow four tiny stubs of arms ready for growth to maturity. L. laevigata is apparently not an exception to this behavior, as many individuals observed in nature are missing arms or, on occasion, in the comet form.

Some species of other reef inhabitants prey on this species of sea star. Various pufferfishes, Charonia species (triton shells), harlequin shrimp, and even some sea anemones have been observed to eat whole or parts of the sea stars. The Blue Linckia is also prone to parasitization by a species of the parasitic gastropod Thyca crystallina. Commensal associations sometimes play part on this echinoderm's life; animals such as Periclimenes shrimp are sometimes found commensally on the oral or aboral surface of the animal, picking up mucus and detritus.

This sea star is fairly popular with marine aquarium hobbyists, where it requires a proper, slow acclimatization before entering the tank system, and an adequate food source similar to that found in its natural habitat. Generally thought of as a detritivore, many sources maintain that this species will indefinitely graze throughout the aquarium for organic films or sedentary, low-growing organisms such as sponges and algae. In the marine aquarium hobby, they have been seen to consume Asterina Starfish, which are commonly introduced into such aquaria on the ubiquitous "live rock" used in such settings. In 2021 pictures surfaced on Reddit of a linckia eating an Asternia it takes roughly 45 mins to fully devour the starfish. It's a worthy pest control depending on how abundant the food source is, as well as such factors as the conditions of shipping, acclimatization, and water quality, this species has been kept in captivity with variable success. This species has yet to be bred in captivity for sustainable harvest.

This species has long been a staple of the sea-shell trade, which involves marketing dried sea star tests (skeletons) for curios or decoration. Some regions of their habitat have seen significant population decrease due to the continuous harvesting by the sea-shell and tourism industries.

== Gallery ==
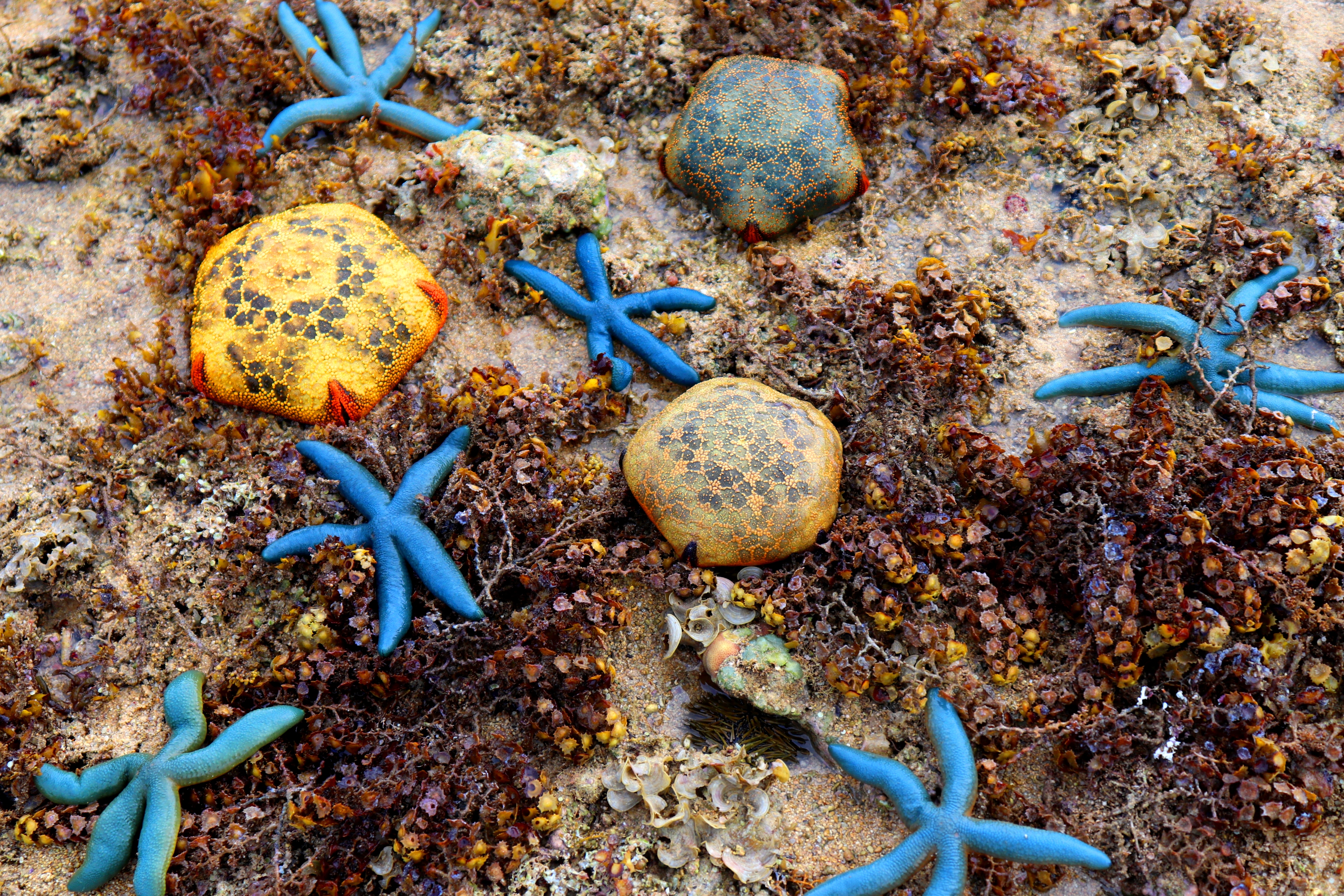
In Aguirangan Island, Philippines

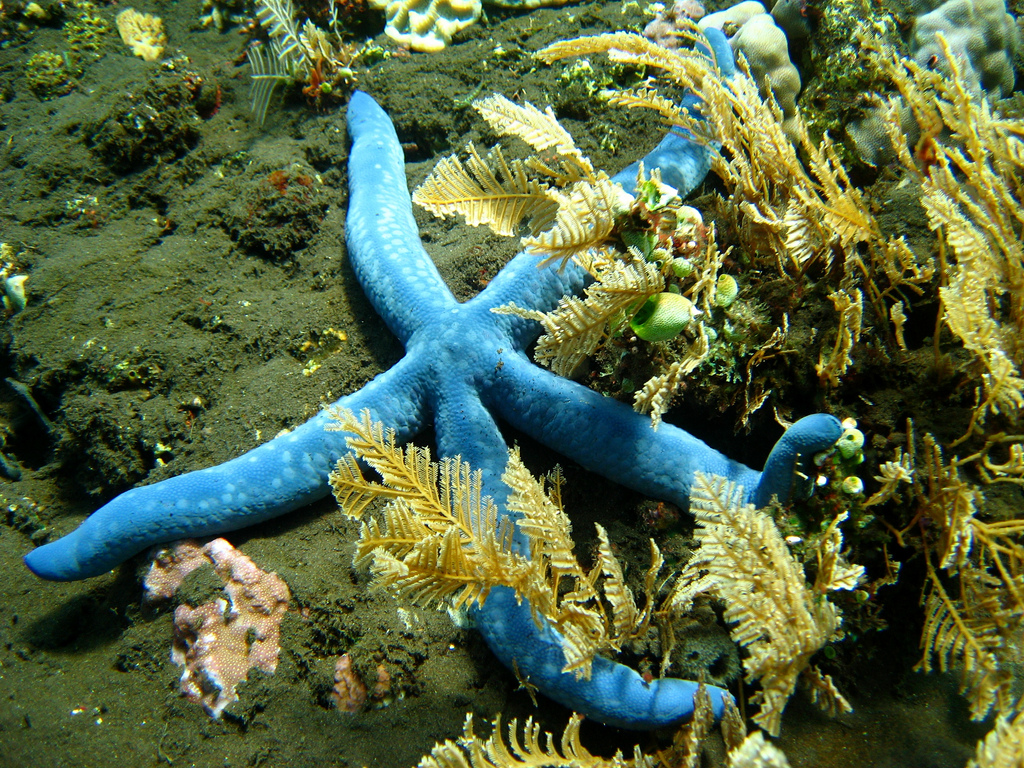
In Bali

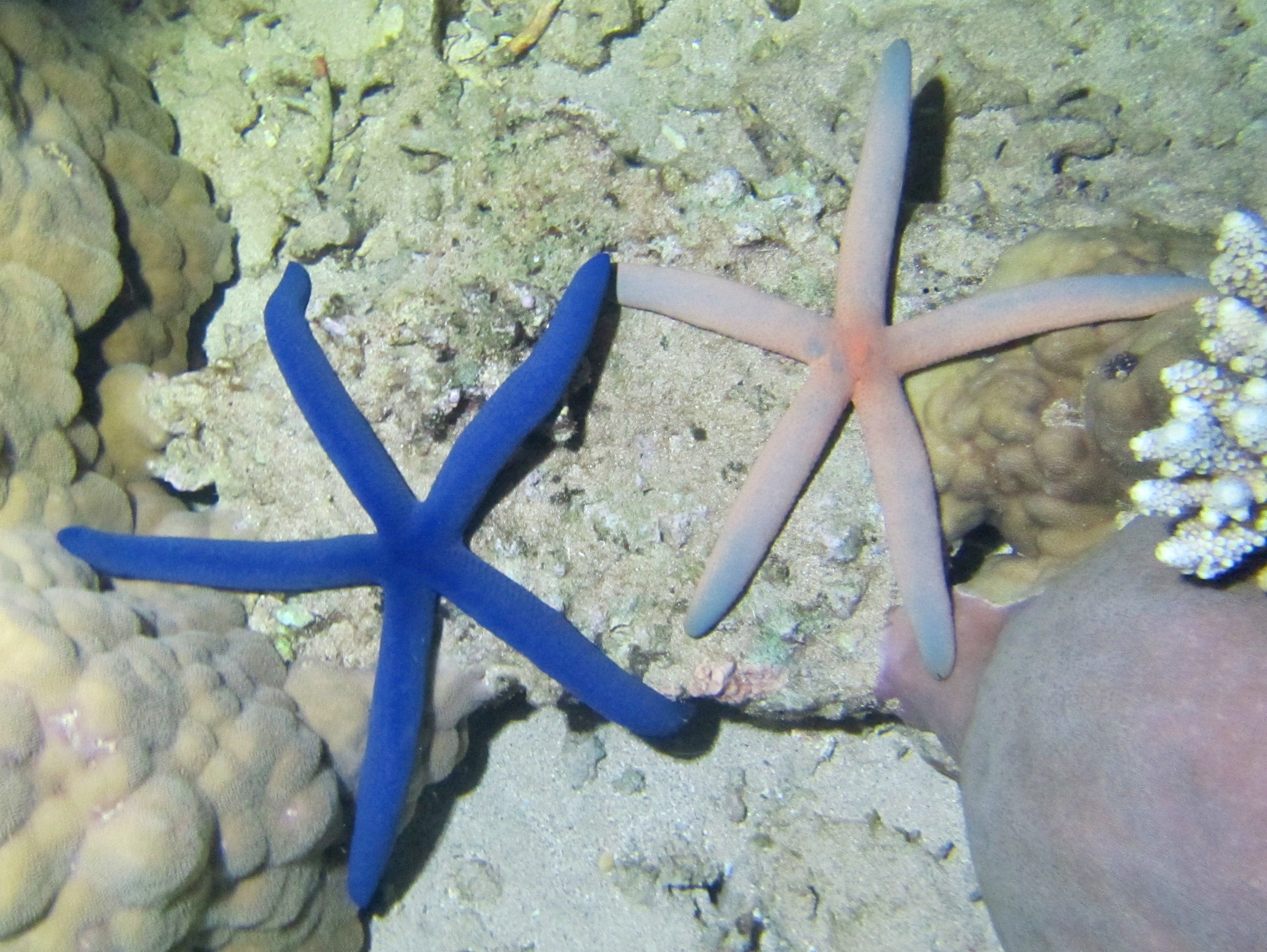
In some places non-blue color morphs can be frequent, such as pink (here in Mayotte)

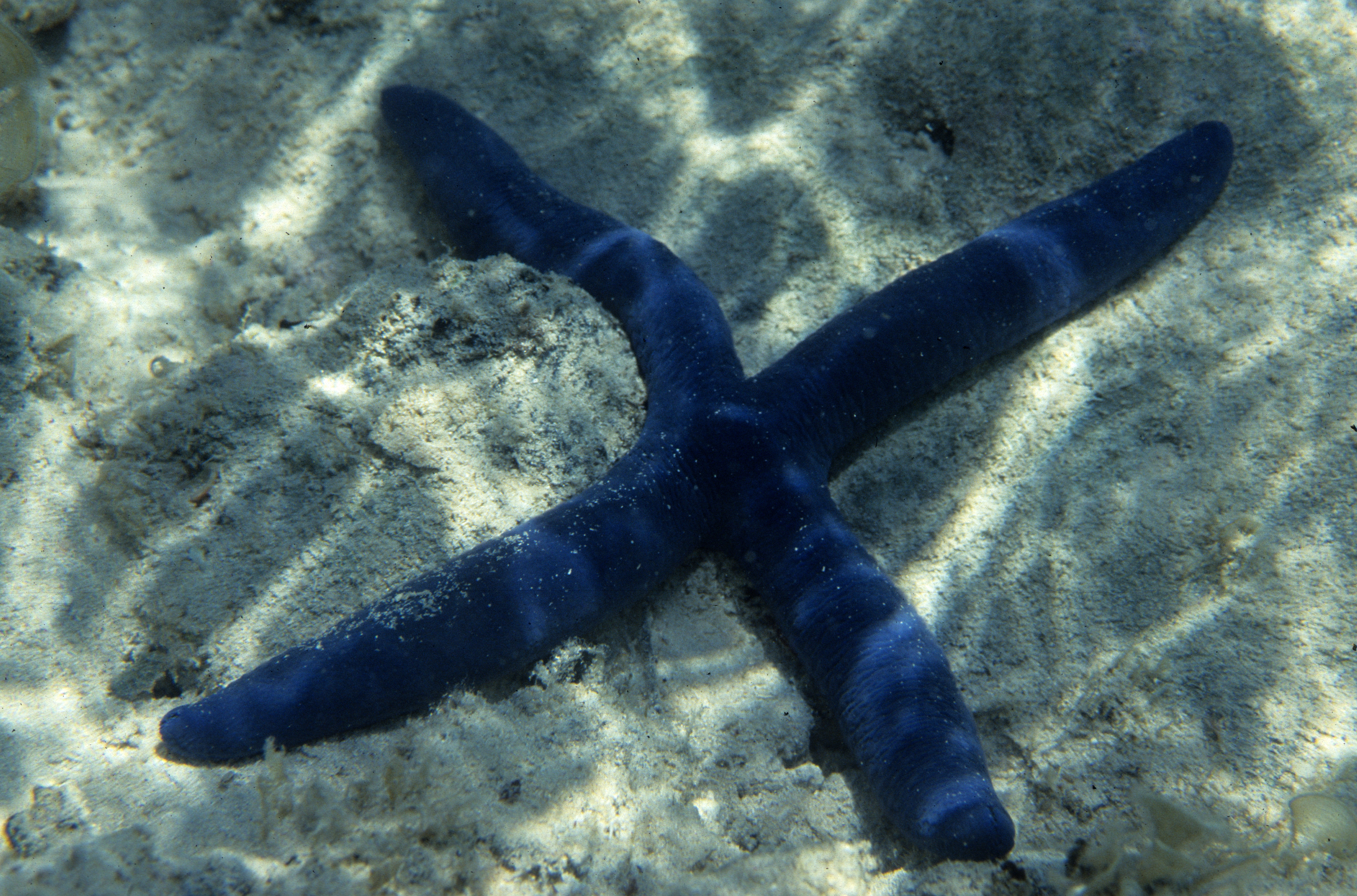
4-armed specimen

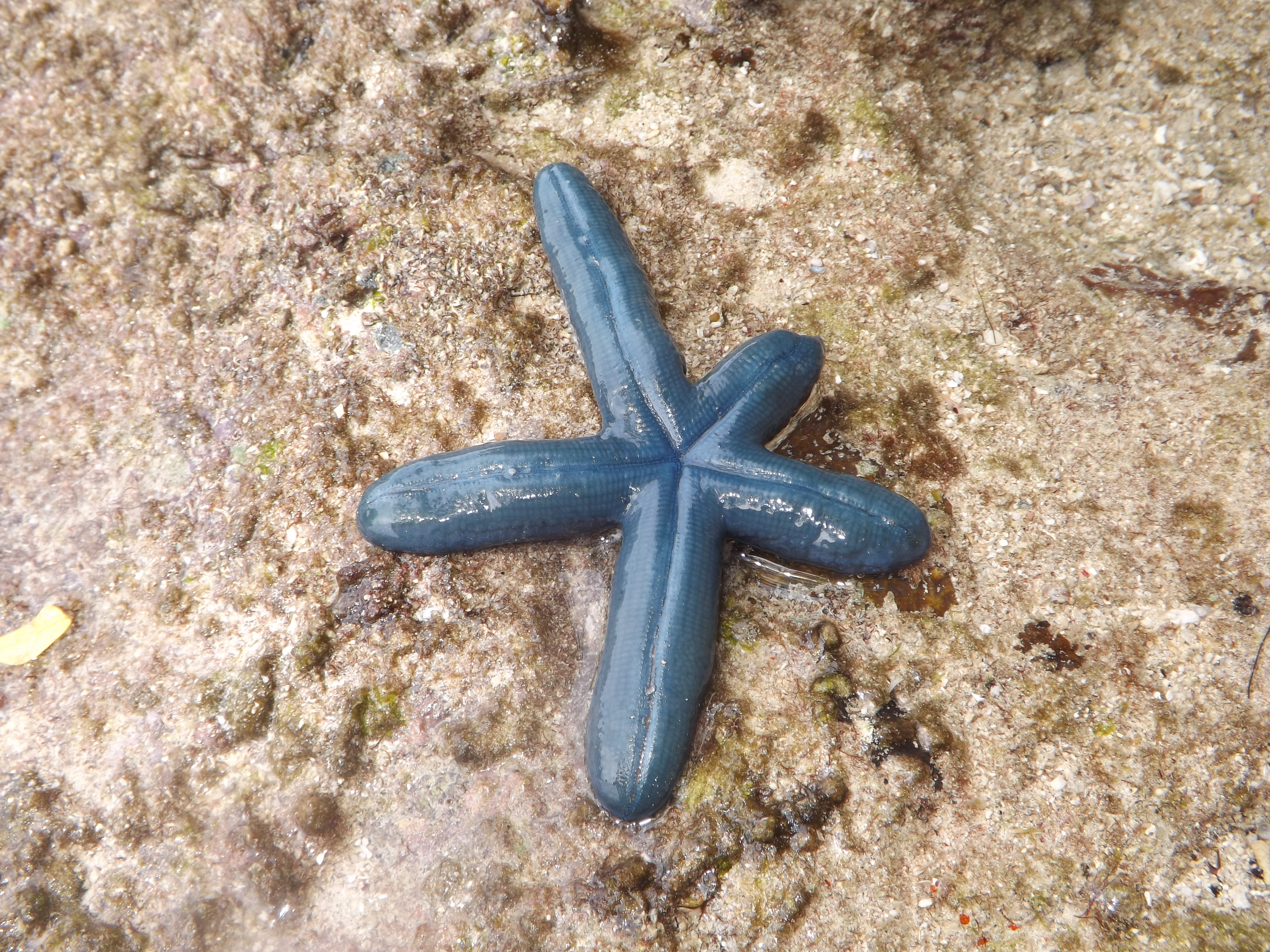
Thick blue starfish at Wakatobi National Park, 2017

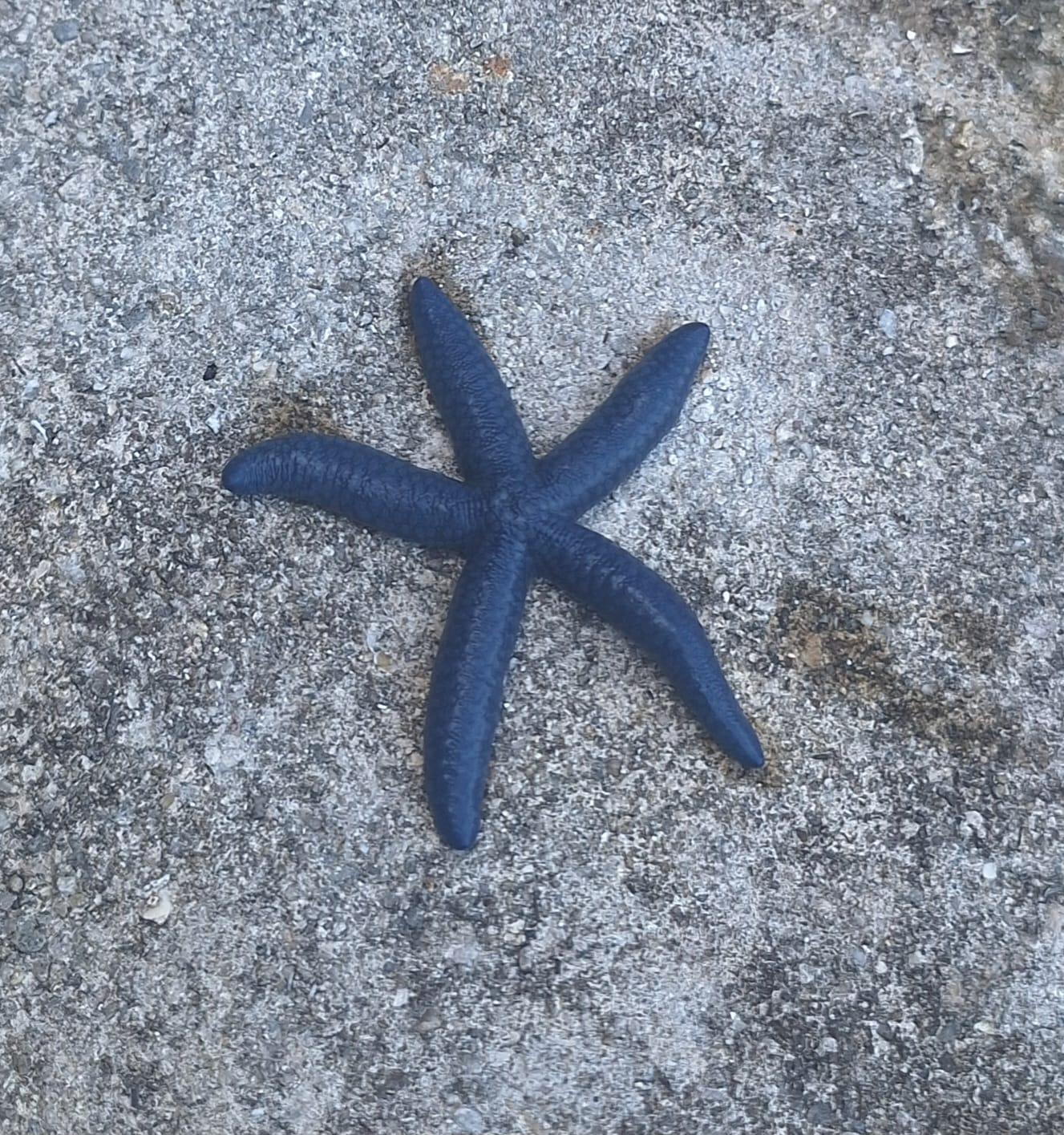
כוכב ים from the Philippines

== See also ==
- Leptasterias pusilla
