= Bay Nature =

American nature magazine

- Cover of the Winter 2024 issue of Bay Nature
- Editor in Chief: Victoria Schlesinger
- Categories: Natural History; San Francisco Bay Area
- Frequency: Quarterly
- Publisher: Bay Nature Institute
- Founder: David Loeb, Malcolm Margolin
- Founded: January 2001
- Based in: Berkeley, California
- Website: https://baynature.org/
- ISSN: 1531-5193
- OCLC: 60628776

Bay Nature is a magazine dedicated to the natural history of the San Francisco Bay Area. It is published by nonprofit organization Bay Nature Institute.

== Content ==
Bay Nature publishes information about nature in the region, environmental news, and essays. Its focus includes the immediate Bay Area, as well as Sonoma County, Monterey Bay, and the Central Valley.

== History ==
Bay Nature founder David Loeb was inspired to start the magazine after failing to find a local natural history periodical following a visit to China Camp State Park. In 1997, he sent a proposal to Heyday Books publisher, Malcolm Margolin, who agreed to publish the magazine. The first issue was published in January 2001. In 2004, it became a nonprofit.

== See also ==
- Institute for Nonprofit News (member)
