= Thyca stellasteris =

Scientific classification
- Kingdom: Animalia
- Phylum: Mollusca
- Class: Gastropoda
- Subclass: Caenogastropoda
- Order: Littorinimorpha
- Family: Eulimidae
- Genus: Thyca
- Species: T. stellasteris

Binomial name
- Thyca stellasteris Koehler & Vaney, 1912

Synonyms
- Thyca (Thyca) stellasteris Koehler & Vaney, 1912

Species of gastropod

Thyca stellasteris is a species of sea snail, a marine gastropod mollusk in the family Eulimidae. The species is one of a number within the genus Thyca.
