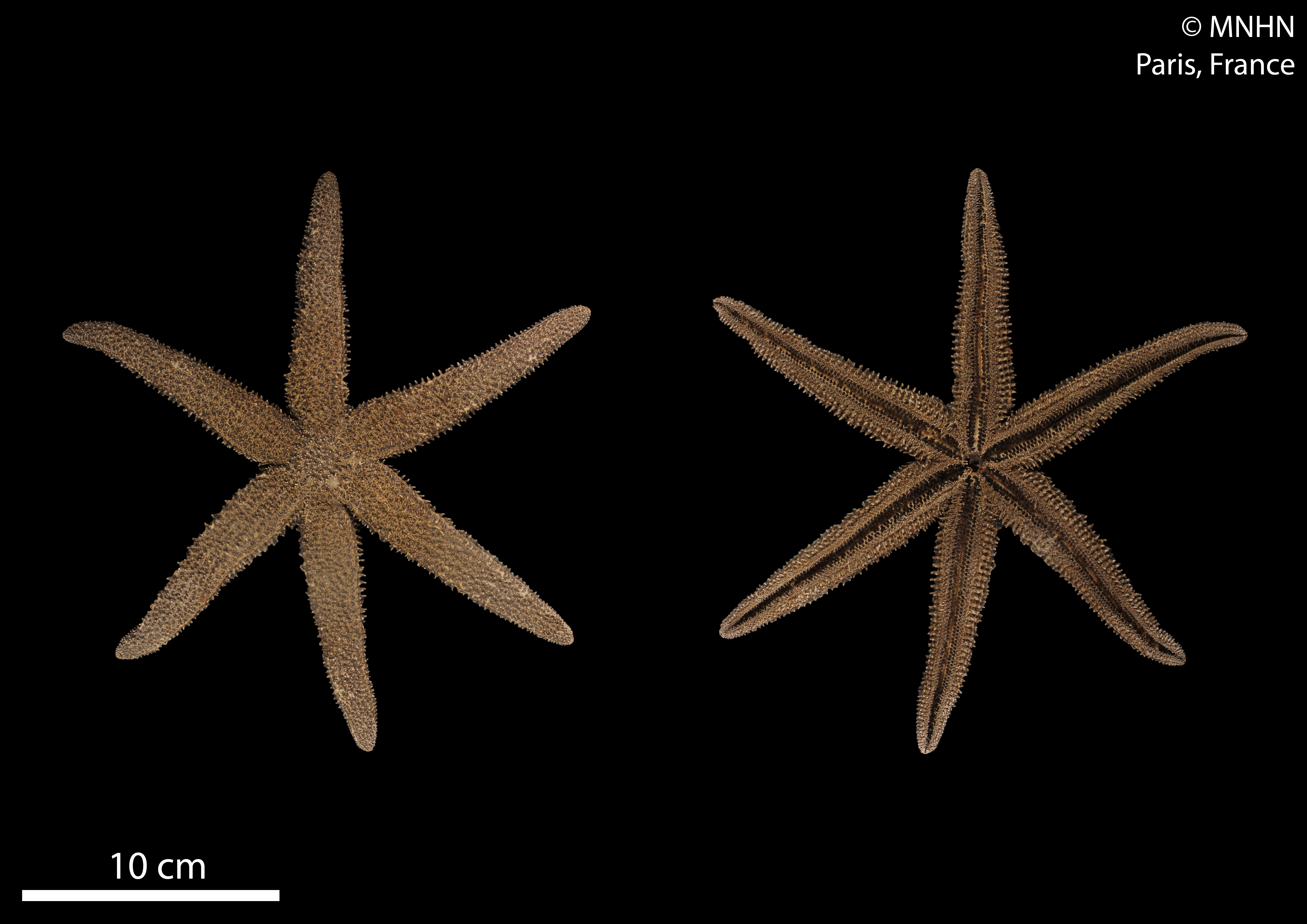

Scientific classification
- Kingdom: Animalia
- Phylum: Echinodermata
- Class: Asteroidea
- Order: Forcipulatida
- Family: Asteriidae
- Genus: Leptasterias
- Species: L. polaris

Binomial name
- Leptasterias polaris (Müller & Troschel, 1842)

Synonyms
- Asteracanthion katherinae Müller & Troschel, 1842; Asteracanthion polaris Müller & Troschel, 1842; Asterias acervata Stimpson, 1862; Asterias borealis Perrier, 1875; Leptasterias bartletti A.H. Clark, 1940; Leptasterias polaris (Müller & Troschel, 1842); Pisaster grayi Verrill, 1914

= Leptasterias polaris =

Species of starfish

Leptasterias polaris, the polar six-rayed star, is a species of starfish in the family Asteriidae. It is found in cold waters in the northwest Atlantic Ocean and in polar regions.

== Description ==
Leptasterias polaris is a small, slow growing, compact starfish with six arms. The aboral (upper) surface has a covering of blunt spiny plates and is usually some shade of brown or grey.

== Distribution and habitat ==
Leptasterias polaris occurs in the north west Atlantic Ocean from the Gulf of Maine northwards, and in Arctic waters. It has also been found in the Azores and European waters.

== Biology ==
Leptasterias polaris is a major predator in the cold waters in which it lives. Young individuals are mostly found on rocks less than 10 metres (33 ft) deep and feed on such bivalve molluscs as the blue mussel (Mytilus edulis) and Hiatella arctica. Older individuals move to deeper waters where the seabed is sand or mud and feed on clams such as the Greenland cockle (Serripes groenlandicus), Spisula polynyma, the blunt gaper (Mya truncata) and the Atlantic jackknife clam (Ensis directus) which they dig up with their tube feet. They also eat gastropod molluscs such as the common whelk (Buccinum undatum) and the American pelicanfoot (Arrhoges occidentalis). In a laboratory study it was found that the starfish detected their prey by odours in the water. Hungry starfish which had not fed for two months, worked their way across the current until their olfactory tube feet, located near the tips of their arms, smelt an edible prey item after which they begin to travel up-current towards the source of the odour. Moving upstream in this way had the advantage that the prey was less likely to detect the approach of the starfish. Well fed starfish wandered in a more random fashion.

Breeding takes place when the water temperature falls to about 2 °C (36 °F) and the day length is at its minimum. Over a period of seven to eight weeks the normally solitary starfish begin to aggregate, eventually some climbing on top of others. The males release sperm which accumulates in a layer on the seabed and the females later release their eggs on top. The females brood the developing eggs for four months but that is probably more to keep them clean and healthy and prevent predation than to speed their development as unbrooded eggs were found in the laboratory to develop at the same rate as brooded ones.
