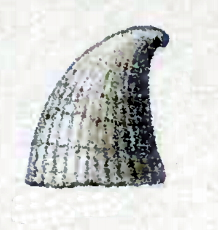
- Drawing of a shell of Thyca astericola

Scientific classification
- Kingdom: Animalia
- Phylum: Mollusca
- Class: Gastropoda
- Subclass: Caenogastropoda
- Order: Littorinimorpha
- Family: Eulimidae
- Genus: Thyca
- Species: T. astericola

Binomial name
- Thyca astericola (A. Adams & Reeve, 1850)

Synonyms
- Pileopsis astericola A. Adams & Reeve, 1850 (original combination); Thyca (Thyca) astericola (A. Adams & Reeve, 1850) · accepted, alternate representation

= Thyca astericola =

Species of gastropod

Thyca astericola is a species of sea snail, a marine gastropod mollusk in the family Eulimidae. The species is one of a number within the genus Thyca.

== Description ==
The white shell attains a height of 6 mm. It is high-conical and sculptured with fine close-set radiating riblets. The margin is crenulated.

== Distribution ==
The type species was found in the Sulu Sea, north of Borneo, on the tubercle of a starfish.
