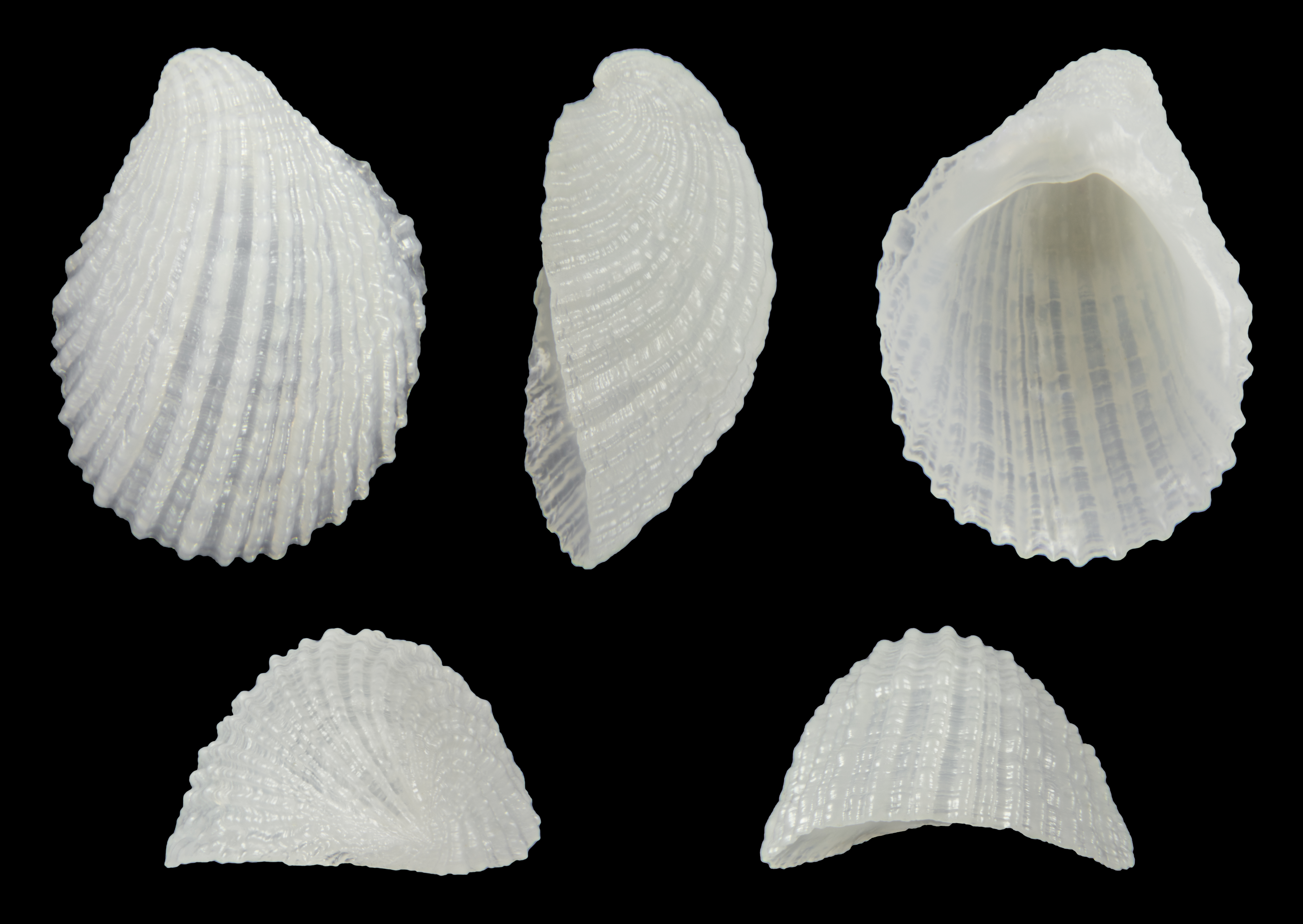
- Shell of T. crystallina

Scientific classification
- Kingdom: Animalia
- Phylum: Mollusca
- Class: Gastropoda
- Subclass: Caenogastropoda
- Order: Littorinimorpha
- Family: Eulimidae
- Genus: Thyca
- Species: T. crystallina

Binomial name
- Thyca crystallina (Gould, 1846)

Synonyms
- Pileopsis crystallina Gould, 1846; Thyca (Bessomia) crystallina (Gould, 1846); Thyca pellucida Kükenthal, 1897

= Thyca crystallina =

Species of gastropod

Thyca crystallina is a species of sea snail, a marine gastropod mollusc in the family Eulimidae. It is one of nine species within the genus Thyca, all of which are parasitic on starfish in the Indo-Pacific Ocean. This species was first described in 1846 by the American conchologist Augustus Addison Gould as Pileopsis crystallina but was later transferred to Thyca.

== Description ==
The shell of T. crystallina is conical, transparent and slightly curved, and is sculptured with longitudinal grooves. The colour is variable and may be tan or bluish; the colouring does not necessarily resemble that of the host starfish.

== Distribution ==
The species is located in the Indian Ocean and western Pacific Ocean, ranging from Madagascar to Hawaii.

== Ecology ==
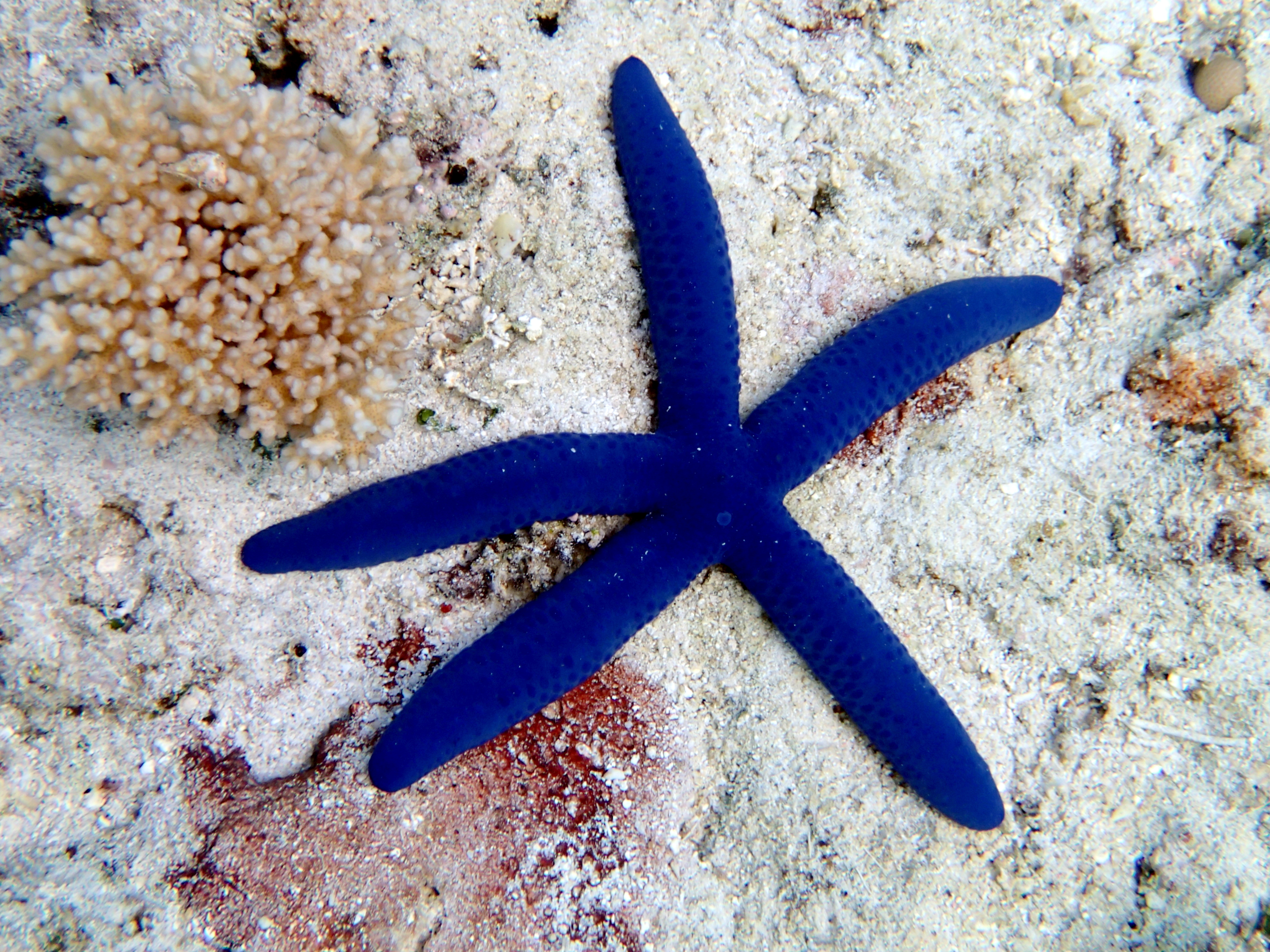
Linckia laevigata in the Tonga archipelago

Thyca crystallina is an ectoparasite of a starfish, often the blue starfish Linckia laevigata or the multicolour Linckia multifora. The mollusc larvae tend to settle on the upper side of one of the arms of the starfish, usually near its attachment to the disc. As they grow, they migrate to the underside of the arm, settling on the right side of the starfish's ambulacral groove, and orientating themselves towards its mouth, and here they become firmly attached. All the larger molluscs are female, and the larger of these have dwarf males attached to the starfish living under the front end of their mantles.

This mollusc is at an early stage of becoming parasitic and has relatively few modifications to adopt this lifestyle. The ventral surface has a central mouth and adheres to the starfish by suction created by the muscular pharynx. Nourishment is derived from grazing the host's tissues and the suction eventually forms a lesion. On larger individuals, a proboscis is inserted deeper into the host's tissues.
