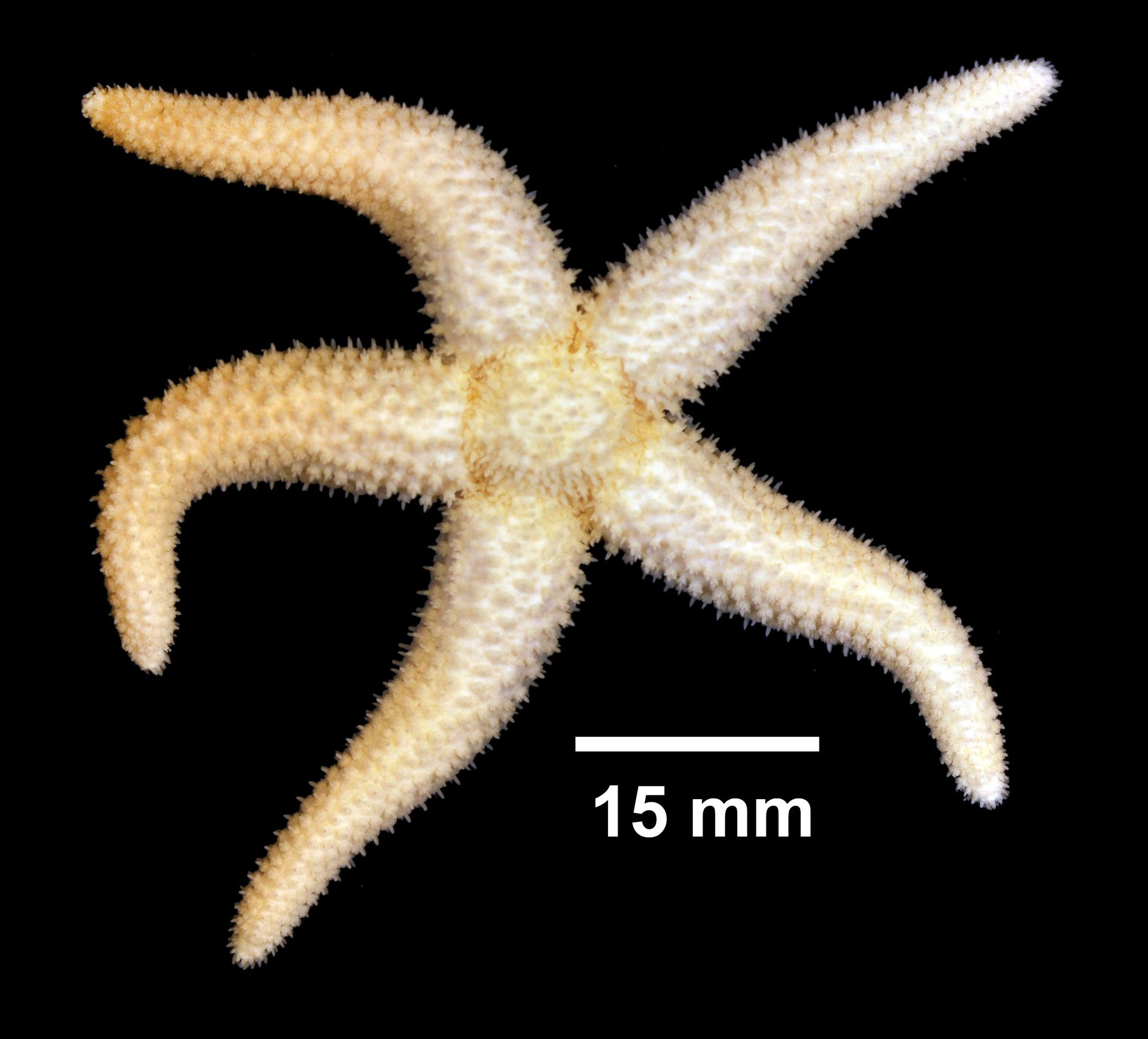

Scientific classification
- Kingdom: Animalia
- Phylum: Echinodermata
- Class: Asteroidea
- Order: Forcipulatida
- Family: Asteriidae
- Genus: Leptasterias
- Species: L. tenera

Binomial name
- Leptasterias tenera (Stimpson, 1862)

Synonyms
- Asteracanthion flaccida A. Agassiz, 1866; Asterias tenera Stimpson, 1862

= Leptasterias tenera =

Species of starfish

Leptasterias tenera is a species of starfish in the family Asteriidae. It is found on the eastern coast of North America.

== Description ==
Leptasterias tenera is a small starfish with five arms and a slow growth rate. It can grow to a diameter of 16 centimetres (6.3 in) but most adults only reach about half that size.

== Distribution and habitat ==
Leptasterias tenera occurs on the eastern seaboard of Canada and the United States, ranging from Nova Scotia and Prince Edward Island southwards to Cape Hatteras. It is also known from the Sargasso Sea. It is found at depths down to about 50 metres (160 ft) on sandy or muddy seabeds.

== Biology ==
Leptasterias tenera is an ambush predator. It remains stationary on the seabed for long periods, snaring any small crustaceans which come into contact with it, gripping them with its tube feet and pedicellariae and flexing its arms to transfer the prey to its mouth. Large items are pushed as far as they will go into the pyloric stomach but only the portion inside is digested at first.

A study was undertaken of the breeding behaviour of Leptasterias tenera at Block Island near Rhode Island at a site about 30 metres (98 ft) deep, where the sea floor was fine muddy sand. The area was dominated by the presence of tube-building amphipods and there were some bivalve molluscs. Leptasterias tenera was the most numerous predatory species but also present were other starfish Asterias forbesi and Asterias rubens and the Jonah crab Cancer borealis. Up to twelve Leptasterias tenera were found per square metre (ten per square yard). Examination of the stomach contents showed that the main items of diet were the numerous amphipods. Breeding took place in the winter. The eggs were large, yolky and few in number. The fertilised eggs were at first retained within the pyloric stomach of the female where the embryos underwent the first stages of their development. Later they emerged and the brachiolaria larvae were brooded underneath the arched disc of the starfish. The breeding season lasted about four months, but it was unclear for how long any individual female brooded her young. While brooding, feeding either stopped or was restricted but a few brooding females were found to have prey items in their pyloric stomachs.
