= Thyca hawaiiensis =

Scientific classification
- Kingdom: Animalia
- Phylum: Mollusca
- Class: Gastropoda
- Subclass: Caenogastropoda
- Order: Littorinimorpha
- Family: Eulimidae
- Genus: Thyca
- Species: T. hawaiiensis

Binomial name
- Thyca hawaiiensis Warén, 1980

Synonyms
- Thyca (Bessomia) hawaiiensis Warén, 1980

Species of gastropod

Thyca hawaiiensis is a species of sea snail, a marine gastropod mollusk in the family Eulimidae. The species is one of a number within the genus Thyca.
