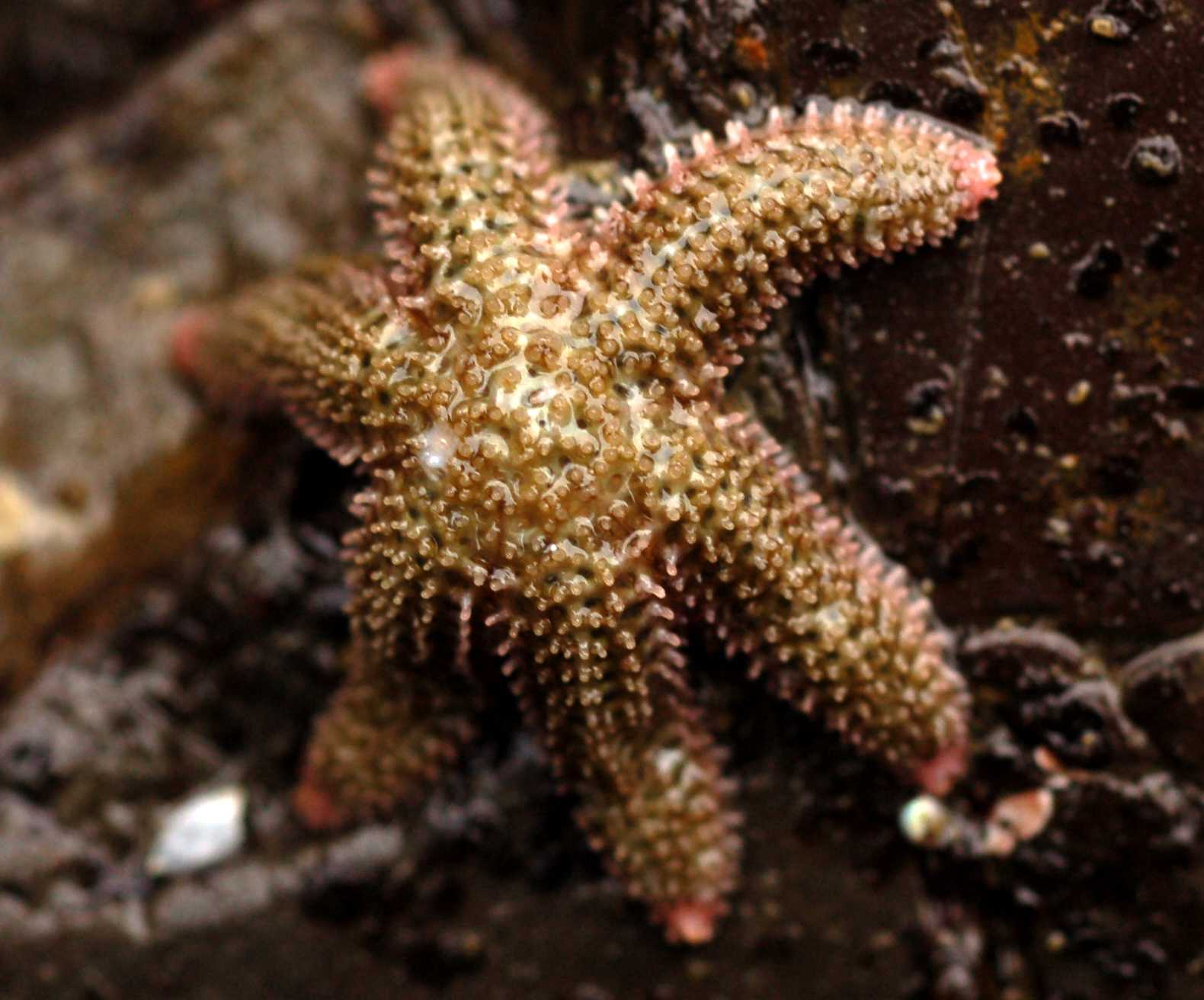

Scientific classification
- Kingdom: Animalia
- Phylum: Echinodermata
- Class: Asteroidea
- Order: Forcipulatida
- Family: Asteriidae
- Genus: Leptasterias
- Species: L. hexactis

Binomial name
- Leptasterias hexactis (Stimpson, 1862)

Synonyms
- Asterias aequalis Stimpson, 1862; Asterias epichlora Verrill, 1909; Asterias hexactis Stimpson, 1862; Asterias vancouveri Perrier, 1875; Leptasterias (Hexasterias) hexactis (Stimpson, 1862); Leptasterias aequalis (Stimpson, 1862); Leptasterias aequalis var. compacta Verrill, 1914; Leptasterias aequalis var. concinna Verrill, 1914; Leptasterias epichlora Verrill, 1914

= Leptasterias hexactis =

Species of starfish

Leptasterias hexactis is a species of starfish in the family Asteriidae, commonly known as the six-rayed star. It is found in the intertidal zone of the western seaboard of the United States. It is a predator and is unusual among starfish in that it broods its eggs and young.

== Taxonomy ==
Leptasterias hexactis forms part of a species complex. Over the years, various authorities have discussed the phylogenetic relationships of L. epichlora, L. aequalis and L. hexactis, all species of Leptasterias found in the north east Pacific Ocean. The authorities were Bush (1918), Fisher (1930), Chia (1966), Kwast (1990) and Stickle (1992). More recent morphological and behavioural studies have resulted, according to the World Register of Marine Species (WoRMS) in the retention of a single species, L. hexactis, with the other two being considered synonyms. WoRMS now recognizes three subspecies, L. hexactis hexactis (Stimpson, 1862) L. hexactis occidentalis Djakonov, 1938 and L. hexactis vancouveri (Perrier, 1875).

== Description ==
Leptasterias hexactis is a rather squat starfish growing to a diameter of about 5 centimetres (2.0 in) with 6 short, broad arms. These are about as long as the disc is wide. The colour of the aboral (upper) surface varies, usually being a plain or mottled dark grey, brown or olive green colour or occasionally brick red. It is densely clad with short, mushroom-shaped spines, interspersed among which are pedicellariae (small, two-jawed pincers). The central row of spines on each arm is distinctive. The oral (under) surface is a pale colour with parallel rows of tube feet with suckers extending along the arms.

In California Leptasterias hexactis might be confused with Leptasterias pusilla but that species is smaller, is usually a pale grey-brown or reddish colour and has elongated, thinner arms and sharp spines.

== Distribution and habitat ==
Leptasterias hexactis occurs in the intertidal zone of the north east Pacific Ocean with a range extending from the San Juan Islands in Washington to the Channel Islands of California. It favours exposed locations battered by surf and may be found at low tide under boulders and hiding among seaweed on the lower shore. Its tube feet are very adhesive and it clings securely to rocks.

== Biology and ecology ==
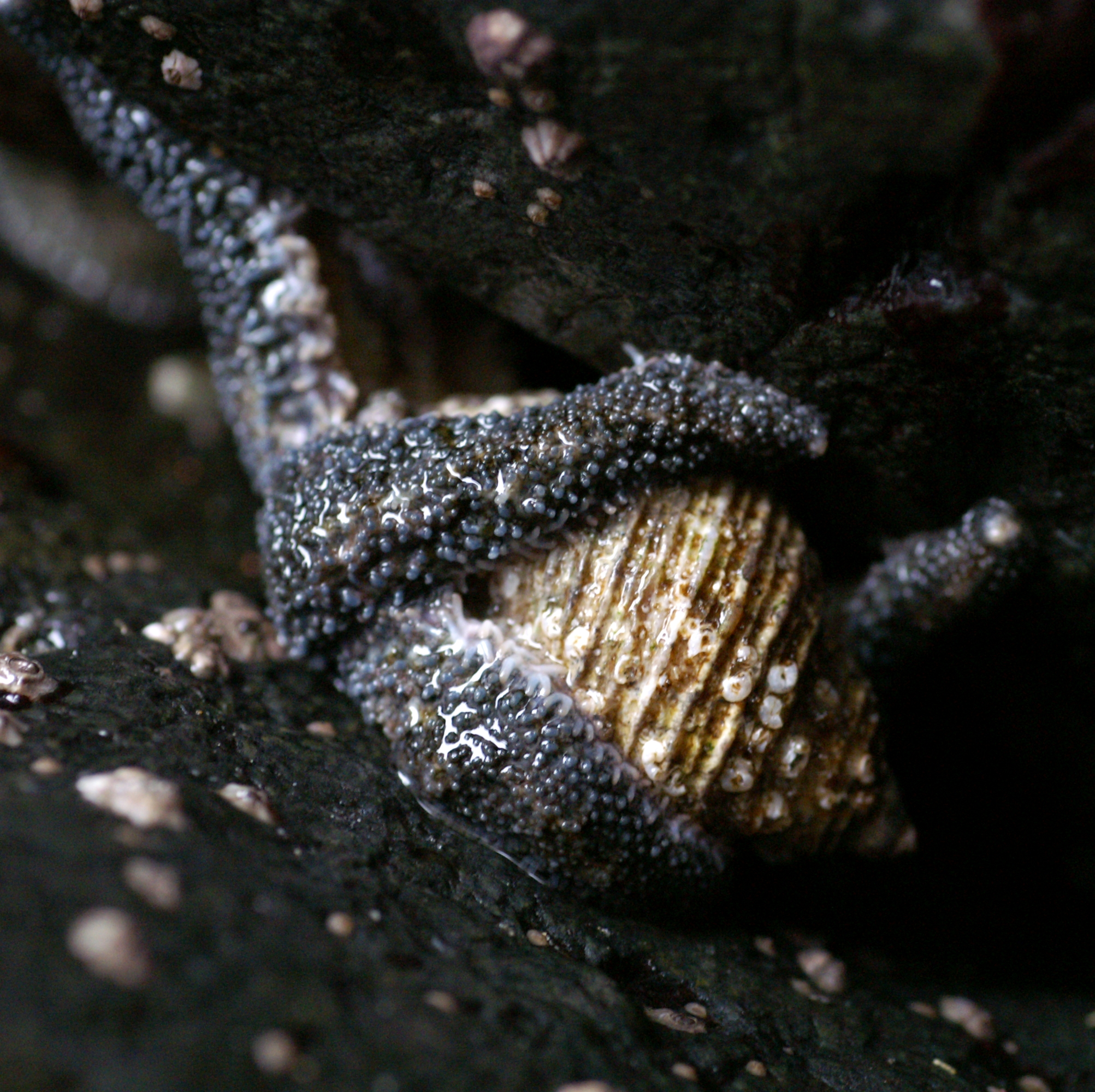
Leptasterias hexactis is attacking snail Nucella lima.

Leptasterias hexactis is a carnivore and is able to attack and capture surprisingly large prey items with high nutritional content. The diet includes sea cucumbers, snails, limpets, mussels, chitons and barnacles as well as carrion. Over much of its range it competes with the larger Pisaster ochraceus (ochre starfish) for food.

Leptasterias hexactis is dioecious with individuals being either male or female. In Puget Sound, reproduction takes place between November and April. The eggs have yolks and between 50 and 1500 are laid, depending on the size of the female. They are fertilized by sperm that has been discharged into the water column by males. The female then holds the eggs with her tube feet in a mass near her mouth, arching her body up as she broods them. She is unable to eat at this time and clings to the rock as best she can with the remaining tube feet though it may only be the tips of the arms that are available to hold her in place. While the eggs are being brooded, she tends to them and keeps them clean. They are lecithotrophic and consume the yolks of their eggs as they develop. After about 40 days the eggs begin to hatch into juveniles, miniature starfish with truncated limbs. These continue to be brooded by the mother for a few weeks before setting off independently on their own. If breeding has taken place in an aquarium, they can be seen crawling over the glass, and sometimes floating on the surface of the water as neuston. They will become mature in about 2 years.
