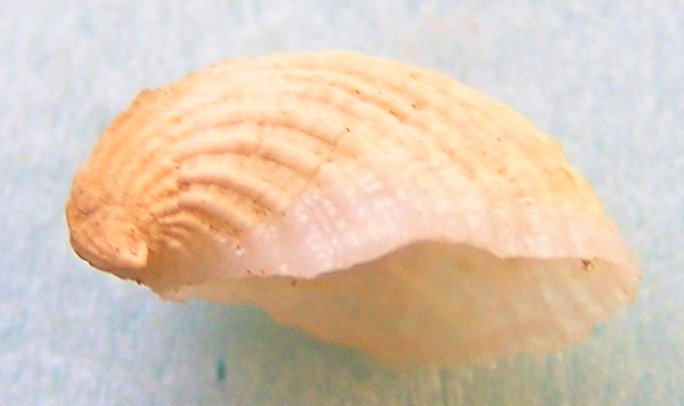
- Shell of Thyca crystallina

Scientific classification
- Kingdom: Animalia
- Phylum: Mollusca
- Class: Gastropoda
- Subclass: Caenogastropoda
- Order: Littorinimorpha
- Family: Eulimidae
- Genus: Thyca; H. Adams & A. Adams, 1854

Type species
- Pileopsis astericola A. Adams & Reeve, 1850

Synonyms
- Bessomia Berry, 1959; Capulus (Thyca); Granulithyca Habe, 1976; Kiramodulus Kuroda, 1949; Thyca (Bessomia) Berry, 1959 · accepted, alternate representation; Thyca (Kiramodulus) Kuroda, 1949 · accepted, alternate representation; Thyca (Thyca) H. Adams & A. Adams, 1854 · accepted, alternate representation

= Thyca =

Genus of gastropods

Thyca is a genus of small sea snails, marine gastropod mollusks in the family Eulimidae. These snails are ectoparasites of starfish; they are relatively unmodified, the underside having become a suction disc with a central mouth that draws nourishment from the host's tissues.

== Description ==
The conical shell is longitudinally grooved, transparent and slightly curved.

== Species ==
Species within the genus Thyca include:

- Thyca astericola (A. Adams & Reeve, 1850)
- Thyca callista Berry, 1959
- Thyca crystallina (Gould, 1846)
- Thyca ectoconcha P. Sarasin & F. Sarasin, 1887
- Thyca hawaiiensis Warén, 1980
- Thyca lactea (Kuroda, 1949)
- Thyca nardoafrianti (Habe, 1976)
- Thyca sagamiensis (Kuroda & Habe, 1971)
- Thyca stellasteris Koehler & Vaney, 1912

Species brought into synonymy

- Thyca pellucida Kükenthal, 1897: synonym of Thyca crystallina (Gould, 1846)
