= Thyca nardoafrianti =

Scientific classification
- Kingdom: Animalia
- Phylum: Mollusca
- Class: Gastropoda
- Subclass: Caenogastropoda
- Order: Littorinimorpha
- Family: Eulimidae
- Genus: Thyca
- Species: T. nardoafrianti

Binomial name
- Thyca nardoafrianti (Habe, 1976)

Synonyms
- Granulithyca nardoafrianti Habe, 1976 (original combination); Thyca (Kiramodulus) nardoafrianti (Habe, 1976)

Species of gastropod

Thyca nardoafrianti is a species of sea snail, a marine gastropod mollusk in the family Eulimidae. The species is one of a number within the genus Thyca.
