= Thyca callista =

Scientific classification
- Kingdom: Animalia
- Phylum: Mollusca
- Class: Gastropoda
- Subclass: Caenogastropoda
- Order: Littorinimorpha
- Family: Eulimidae
- Genus: Thyca
- Species: T. callista

Binomial name
- Thyca callista Berry, 1959

Synonyms
- Thyca (Bessomia) callista Berry, 1959

Species of gastropod

Thyca callista is a species of sea snail, a marine gastropod mollusk in the family Eulimidae. The species is one of a number within the genus Thyca.
