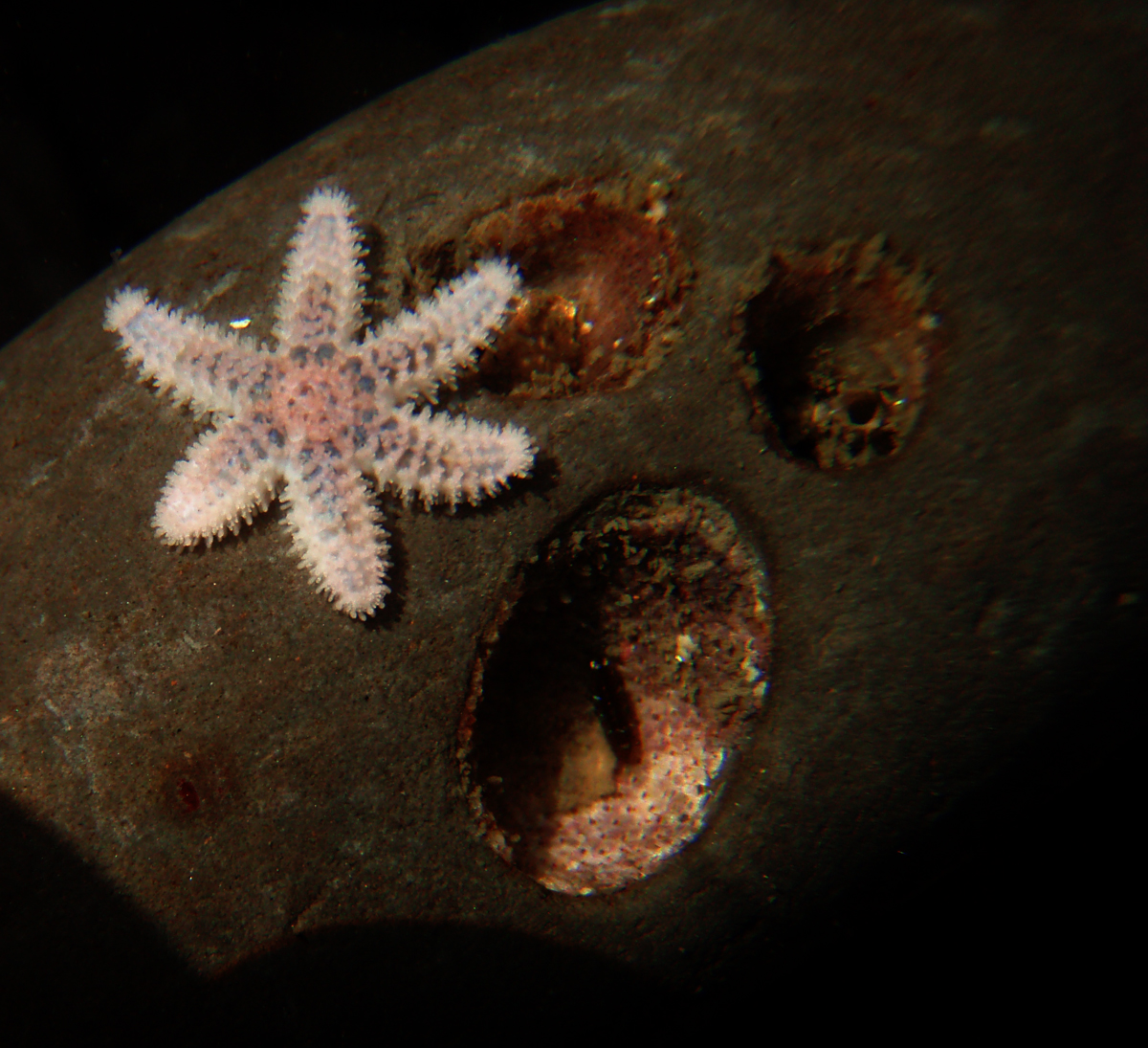

Scientific classification
- Kingdom: Animalia
- Phylum: Echinodermata
- Class: Asteroidea
- Order: Forcipulatida
- Family: Asteriidae
- Genus: Leptasterias
- Species: L. aequalis

Binomial name
- Leptasterias aequalis (Stimpson, 1862)

= Leptasterias aequalis =

Species of starfish

Leptasterias aequalis, common names little six-rayed seastar or six-armed star, is a species of brooding starfish.

This is a small species, with a total width of only about 5 centimetres (2.0 in). The coloration is extremely variable.

This seastar is found in the northeastern Pacific Ocean, from Washington to Southern California. It lives on rocky shores, in the mid-intertidal zone.

Many sea-stars broadcast-spawn their embryos, where fertilization occurs in the water column; however, Leptasterias species brood their embryos locally. The stars form mating aggregations and the female sits on her brood for a period of 6–8 weeks while the embryos develop underneath. Eventually, the embryos fully metamorphose into juvenile sea-stars and walk away, and thus can only locally disperse. Larger females produce larger embryos of great quality; however, as larger broods are produced, a considerable proportion of them are lost.
