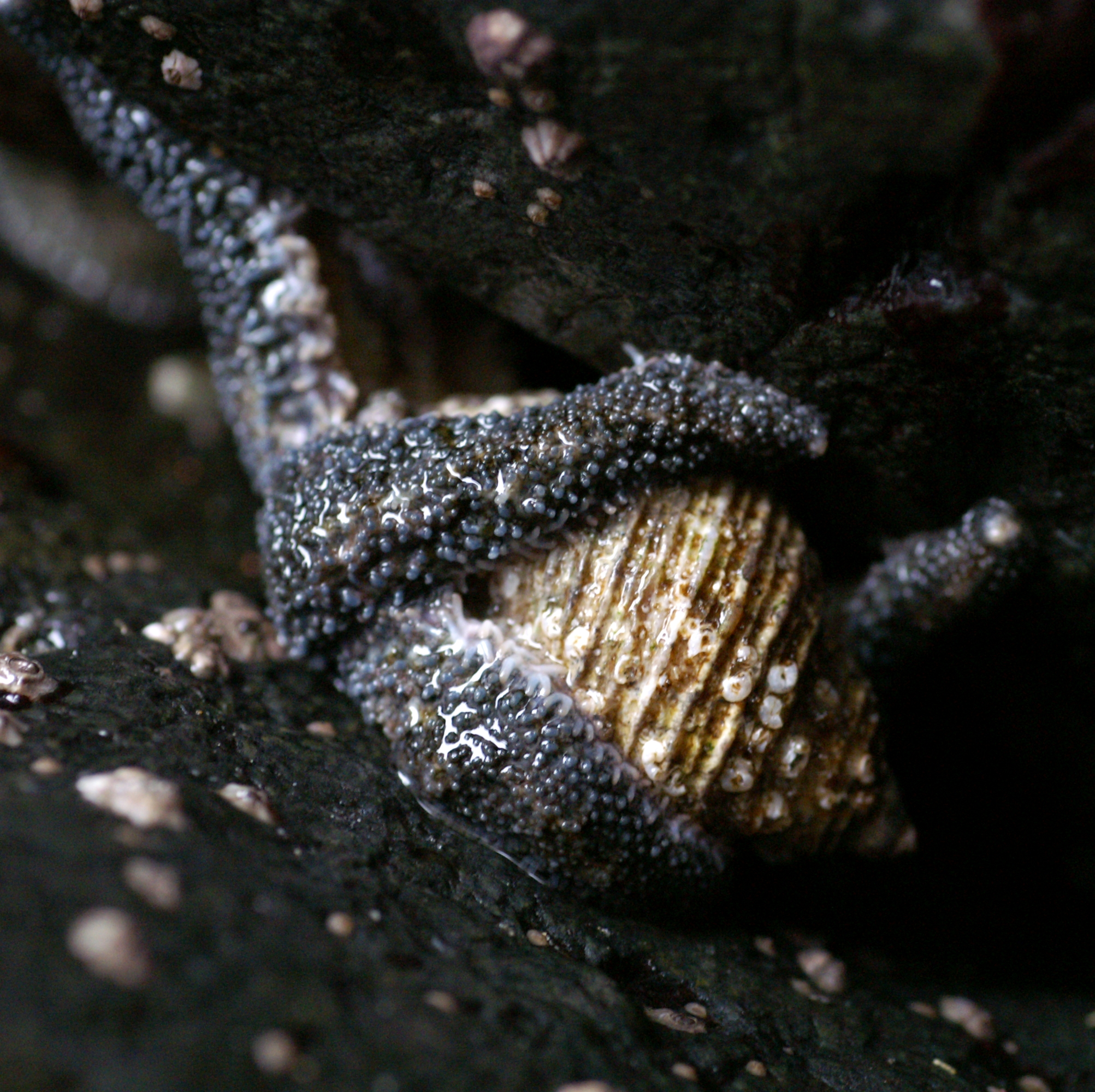
- Nucella lima under attack by the starfish Leptasterias hexactis

Scientific classification
- Kingdom: Animalia
- Phylum: Mollusca
- Class: Gastropoda
- Subclass: Caenogastropoda
- Order: Neogastropoda
- Family: Muricidae
- Genus: Nucella
- Species: N. lima

Binomial name
- Nucella lima (Gmelin, 1791)

Synonyms
- Murex lima Gmelin, 1791; Purpura attenuata Reeve, 1846

= Nucella lima =

Species of gastropod

Nucella lima, commonly known as the File Dog Winkle, is a species of sea snail, a marine gastropod mollusk in the family Muricidae, the murex snails or rock snails.

== Distribution ==
This species is distributed in the Pacific Ocean from the Arctic to Baja California, Mexico; and along Northern Japan.

== Description ==
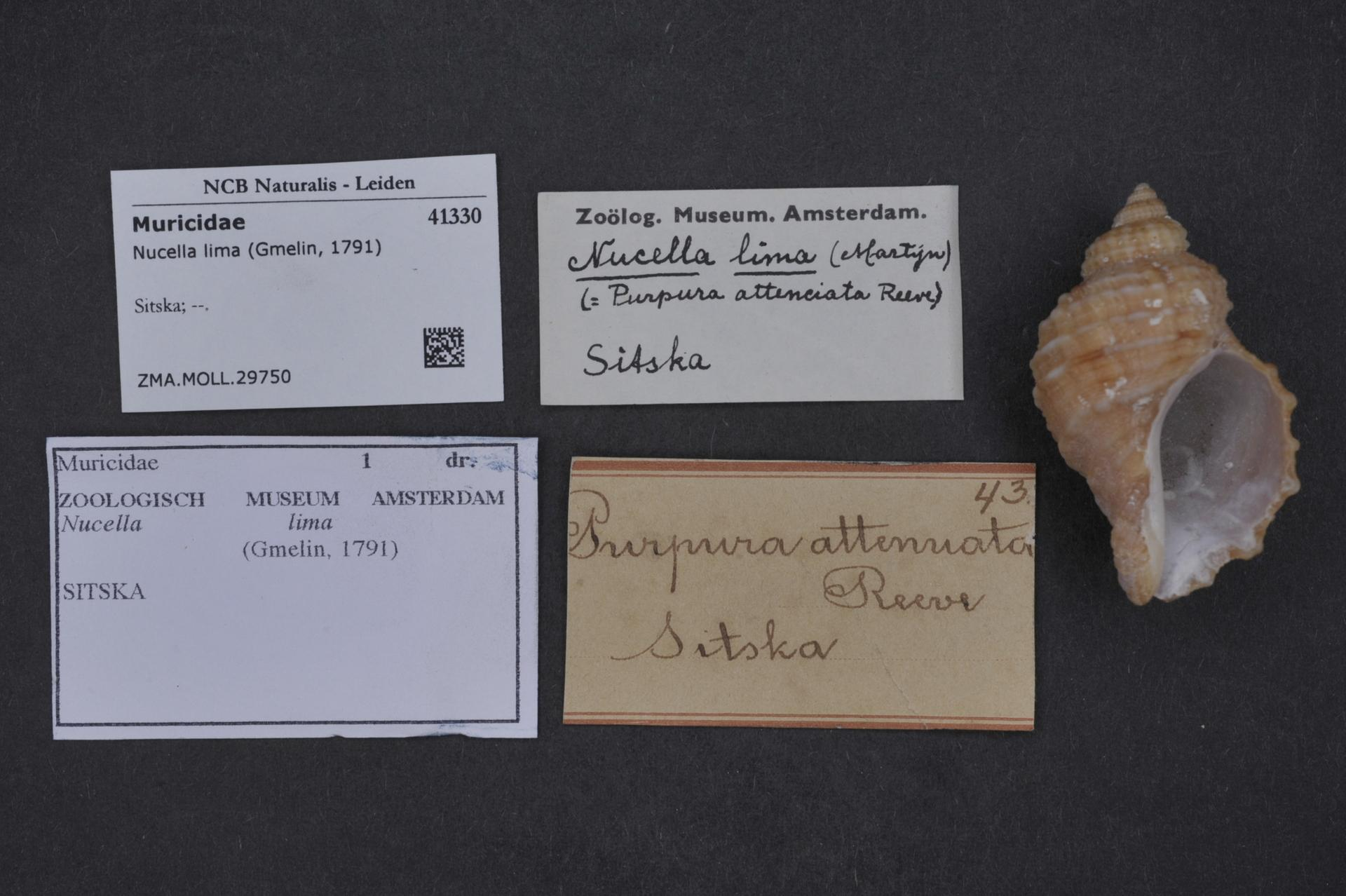
Nucella lima shell

The shell size varies between 19 mm and 51 mm.
