= Malcolm Margolin =

American author (1940–2025)

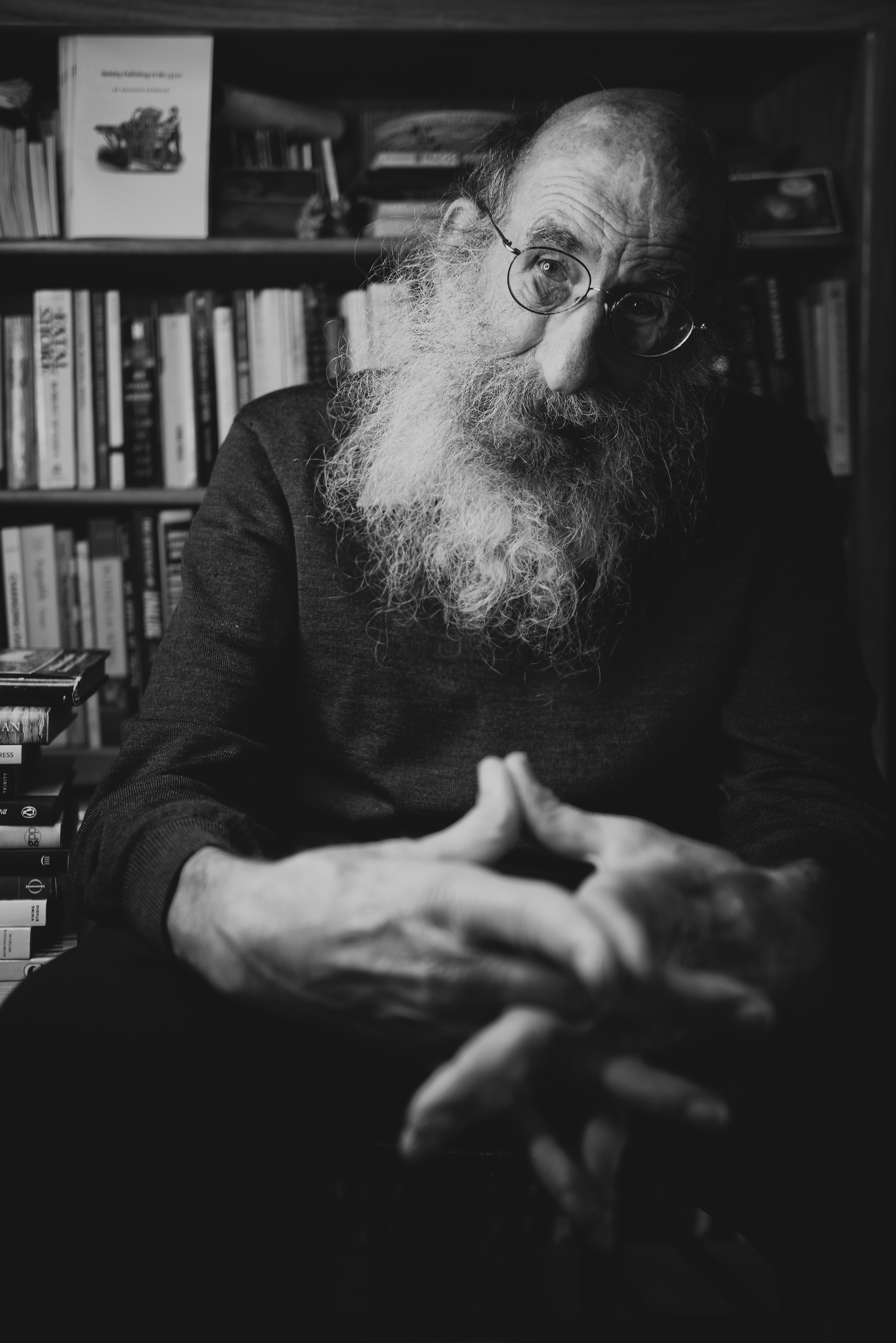
- Margolin at his home in 2021
- Born: October 27, 1940; Boston, Massachusetts, U.S.
- Died: August 20, 2025 (aged 84); Berkeley, California, U.S.
- Occupations: Writer, editor, publisher
- Writing career
- Period: 1974–2025
- Notable awards: American Book Award; Chairman's Commendation, National Endowment for the Humanities; The Hubert Howe Bancroft Award; Cultural Freedom Award, Lannan Foundation; Helen Crocker Russell Award for Community Leadership, San Francisco Foundation,
- Website: californiaican.org

Malcolm Margolin (October 27, 1940 – August 20, 2025) was an American author, publisher and the onetime executive director of Heyday Books, an independent nonprofit publisher and cultural institution in Berkeley, California. From his founding of Heyday in 1974 until his retirement at the end of 2015, he oversaw the publication of several hundred books and the creation of two quarterly magazines: News from Native California, devoted to the history and ongoing cultural concerns of California Indians, and Bay Nature, devoted to the natural history of the San Francisco Bay Area. In the fall of 2017, he established a new enterprise, the California Institute for Community, Art, and Nature (California ICAN) to continue and expand upon the work that he began more than forty years ago.

Margolin was the author and editor of several books including The Ohlone Way: Indian Life in the San Francisco-Monterey Bay Area, named by the San Francisco Chronicle as one of the hundred most important books of the twentieth century by a western writer. His essays and articles have appeared in a number of periodicals including The Nation, the San Francisco Chronicle, and the Los Angeles Times.

== Early life and education ==
Margolin was born in Boston, Massachusetts, on October 27, 1940 to a Lithuanian mother and an American father in a Jewish family. He attended Boston Latin School and Harvard University, where he earned a degree in English Literature in 1964. He met his wife Rina while attending Harvard; she was a psychology major at Radcliffe College.

After college he lived in Puerto Rico (1964–1966) and New York City's Lower East Side (1966–1968). He visited Yosemite National Park in the summer of 1967. In 1969, he moved with Rina to California.

== Career ==
Margolin has lectured widely and has served as advisor and mentor to many other publishers. In addition to founding Heyday (1974), News from Native California (1987), and Bay Nature (2001), he co-founded the Alliance for California Traditional Arts (1997), an organization devoted to California folk arts, and has served on its board since its beginning. In 2001, he co-founded Inlandia Institute, a literary center in Riverside, California.

He had served on the Publication Committee of the Book Club of California and devoted time and effort to a number of environmental, cultural, and social justice organizations and causes.

== Personal life and death ==
From the late 1960s onward, he lived in Berkeley, California, where he and his wife, Rina, raised three children: Reuben (born 1970), Sadie (born 1974), and Jacob (born 1980).

Margolin died from complications of Parkinson's disease in Berkeley, on August 20, 2025, at the age of 84.

== Bibliography ==
Books authored by Margolin include:

- The East Bay Out: A Personal Guide to the East Bay Regional Parks (rev. ed.). Berkeley: Heyday. 1974. ISBN 0-930588-15-0.
- The Earth Manual: How to Work on Wild Land without Taming It. Berkeley: Heyday. 1975. ISBN 0-930588-18-5.
- Margolin, Malcolm, ed. (1981). The Way We Lived: California Indian Stories, Songs & Reminiscences. Berkeley: Heyday. ISBN 0-930588-55-X.
- Margolin, Malcolm; Yolanda Montijo, eds. (1995). Native Ways: California Indian Stories and Memories. Berkeley: Heyday. ISBN 0-930588-73-8.
- The Ohlone Way: Indian Life in the San Francisco–Monterey Bay Area. Berkeley: Heyday. 1978. ISBN 0-930588-01-0.
- Margolin, Malcolm; Linsteadt, Sylvia. Wonderments of the East Bay. Berkeley: Heyday. 2014. ISBN 978-1-59714-296-0.
- Bancroft, Kim. The Heyday of Malcolm Margolin: The Damn Good Times of a Fiercely Independent Publisher. Berkeley: Heyday. 2014. ISBN 978-1-59714-287-8.
- La Perouse, Jean-Francois de Galaup; Edited, introduced, with extensive commentary by Malcolm Margolin. Life in a California Mission: Monterey in 1786. Berkeley: Heyday. 1989. ISBN 978-0-930588-39-7.
- Margolin, Malcolm. Deep Hanging Out: Wanderings and Wonderment in Native California. Berkeley: Heyday. 2021. ISBN 978-1-59714-535-0.

== Awards ==
Margolin received many honors including a Lifetime Achievement Award from the San Francisco Bay Area Book Reviewers Association, a Community Leadership Award from the San Francisco Foundation, a Gold Medal from the Commonwealth Club of California, an American Book Award from the Before Columbus Foundation, and a Cultural Freedom Award from the Lannan Foundation.

In 2012 he received the chairman's Commendation from the National Endowment for the Humanities, the second person in the United States to be so honored.

- 2001 – American Book Award for Publishing/Editing, Before Columbus Foundation
- Award for Organizational Excellence, American Association of State and Local History
- California Council for the Promotion of History Award
- California Indian Health Services Award
- "California State Assembly Resolution" honoring Heyday
- Carey McWilliams Award for Lifetime Achievement, California Studies Association
- Chairman's Commendation, National Endowment for the Humanities
- Cultural Freedom Award, Lannan Foundation
- Distinguished Service Award from the Society of Professional Journalists
- Fred Cody Award, Bay Area Book Reviewers Association
- Gerbode Fellowship
- Helen Crocker Russell Award for Community Leadership, San Francisco Foundation
- The Hubert Howe Bancroft Award, The Bancroft Library
- Martin Baumhoff Award for Achievement by the Society for California Archaeology
- The Oscar Lewis Award for Contributions to Western History, Book Club of California
- Presidential Commendation, The Society for California Archaeology
- Publishing Award, California Horticultural Society
- Special recognition for leadership in the arts, California Arts Council
