= Heyday Books =

California publisher

- Founded: 1974; 51 years ago
- Founder: Malcolm Margolin
- Country of origin: United States
- Headquarters location: Berkeley, California
- Publication types: books, magazines
- Nonfiction topics: California, natural history, Native Americans
- Official website: www.heydaybooks.com

Heyday is an independent nonprofit publisher based in Berkeley, California.

Heyday was founded by Malcolm Margolin in 1974 when he wrote, typeset, designed, and distributed The East Bay Out, a guide to the natural history of the hills and bay shore in and round Berkeley and Oakland, in the East Bay of the San Francisco Bay Area. Heyday publishes around twenty books a year, as well as the quarterly magazine News from Native California.

In 2004, they merged with their nonprofit wing, the Clapperstick Institute, and became a full-fledged 501(c)(3) nonprofit enterprise. In 2016, Margolin retired from Heyday, and Steve Wasserman, previously editor-in-chief of the Los Angeles Times Book Review and an editor-at-large at Yale University Press, became Margolin's successor as publisher and executive director. Since 2020, the company has been co-led by Wasserman, publisher, and longtime staff member Gayle Wattawa, now general manager.

== The Berkeley Roundhouse ==
The Berkeley Roundhouse, also known as the California Indian Publishing Program (CIPP), focuses on California Native Peoples. The Roundhouse hosts Native events and provides literature to under-served Native community members. Since 1987, Heyday has published the quarterly magazine News from Native California, which is written from a Native People's perspective.

== Partnerships ==
Heyday is a frequent partner with other California cultural organizations. Heyday co-founded the California Historical Society Press with the California Historical Society, which together have published several books. Heyday has produced books in conjunction with the California Council for the Humanities; the California State Library; the Bancroft Library at the University of California, Berkeley; the Oakland Museum of California; the Commonwealth Club of California; Santa Clara University; the California Academy of Sciences; the Japanese American National Museum; and the Yosemite Association (now Yosemite Conservancy).

Working with the California Legacy Project at Santa Clara University, Heyday produced the California Legacy series, which focused on California's literary and cultural heritage. In partnership with the Inlandia Institute at the Riverside Public Library, Heyday published books on the Inland Empire in Southern California. Heyday has also published books on Yosemite National Park, and the Sierra Nevada, for the park.

=== Sierra College Press ===
Heyday Books partially funds the Sierra College Press, a university press associated with Sierra College, located in Rocklin, California. The press—which was founded in 2002 and is one of the few in the United States operated by a community college—publishes journals and books, most of which have a focus on the Sierra Nevada region.

== Awards ==
=== Book awards ===
- ALA Notable Book, American Library Association
- American Association for State and Local History Leadership in History Award
- American Book Award, Before Columbus Foundation
- PEN/Beyond Margins Award
- California Book Awards, Commonwealth Club, Gold Medal
- California Collection Book, California Readers Association
- Choice Magazine Outstanding Academic Title
- Commonwealth Club Award, Silver Medal
- Foreword Book of the Year Award, Bronze Medal
- Journalism Award-Media Award, American Planning Association
- Kiriyama Prize Notable Book
- National Wildlife Federation's Communicator of the Year Award
- Northern California Independent Booksellers Association Award
- PEN Oakland Josephine Miles Literary Award
- PubWest Book Design Award
- Rolling Stone Magazine Ralph J. Gleason Award
- William Carlos Williams Award, Academy of American Poets

=== Awards won by Margolin, as publisher ===
- American Book Award for Publishing/Editing, Before Columbus Foundation
- Award for Organizational Excellence, American Association for State and Local History
- California Council for the Promotion of History Award
- California Indian Heath Services Award
- Carey McWilliams Award for Lifetime Achievement, California Studies Association
- Cultural Freedom Award, Lannan Foundation (2008)
- Distinguished Service Award from the Society of Professional Journalists
- Fred Cody Award, Bay Area Book Reviewers Association
- Gerbode Fellowship
- Helen Crocker Russell Award for Community Leadership, San Francisco Foundation
- The Hubert Howe Bancroft Award, The Bancroft Library
- Martin Baumhoff Award for Achievement by the Society for California Archaeology
- The Oscar Lewis Award for Contributions to Western Society, Book Club of California
- Presidential Commendation, The Society for California Archaeology
- Publishing Award, California Horticultural Society
- Special recognition for leadership in the arts, California Arts Council
