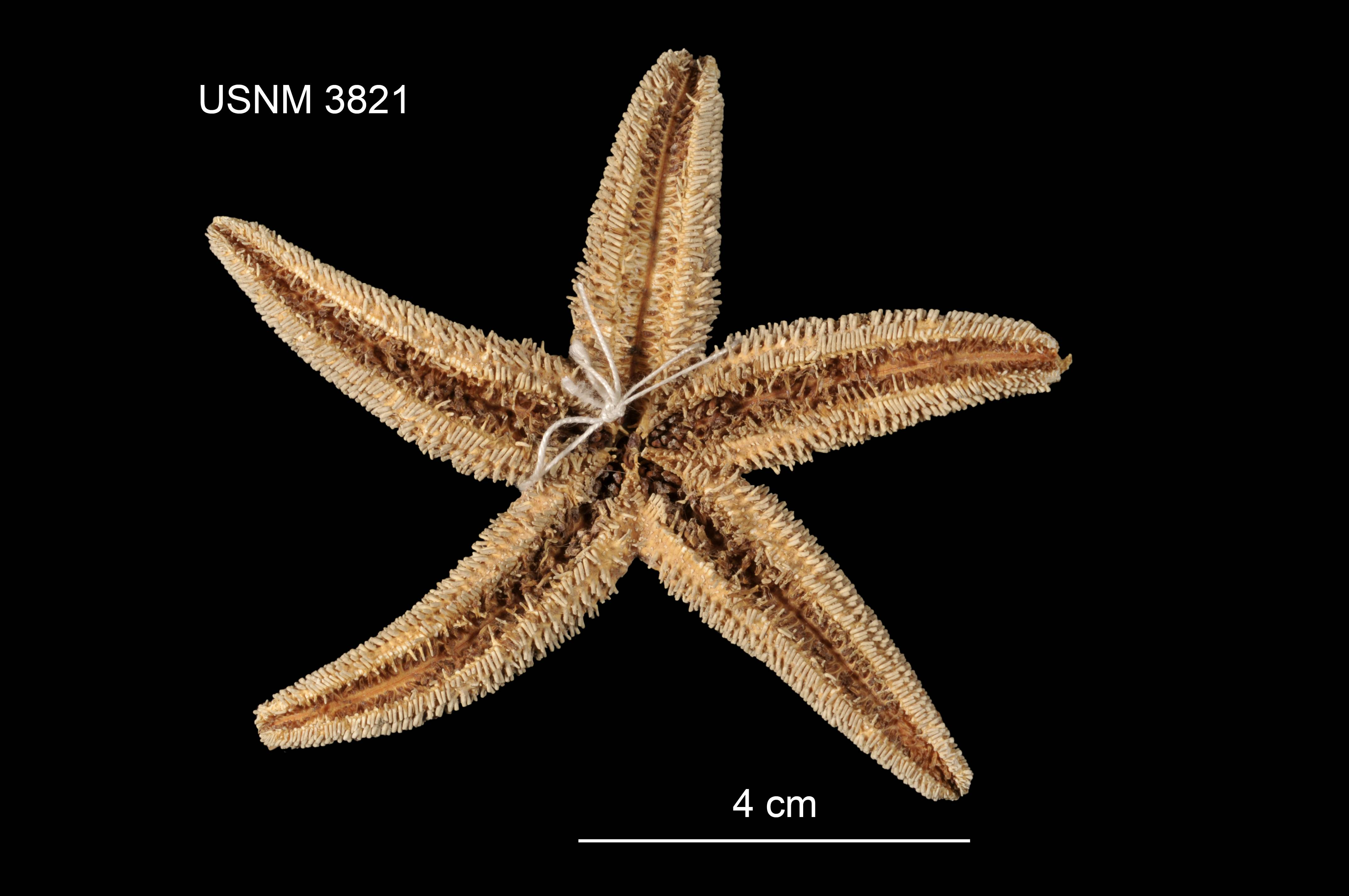

Scientific classification
- Kingdom: Animalia
- Phylum: Echinodermata
- Class: Asteroidea
- Order: Forcipulatida
- Family: Asteriidae
- Genus: Asterias
- Species: A. rathbuni

Binomial name
- Asterias rathbuni (Verrill, 1909) Djakonov, 1950

Synonyms
- Allasterias rathbuni Verrill, 1909; Allasterias anomala (Verrill, 1909) Verrill, 1914; Allasterias rathbuni var. anomala Verrill, 1909; Allasterias rathbuni var. nortonensis Verrill, 1909; Asterias alveolata (Djakonov, 1950); Asterias anomala (Verrill, 1909); Asterias rathbuni f. alveolata Djakonov, 1950; Asterias rathbuni f. anomala (Verrill, 1909) Djakonov, 1950; Asterias rathbuni f. nortonensis (Verrill, 1909) Djakonov, 1950

= Asterias rathbuni =

Species of starfish

Asterias rathbuni is a starfish native to the Pacific coasts of Alaska in the United States and Far East Russia. There are two subspecies.

== Taxonomy ==
According to Addison Emery Verrill it may have first been collected in 1881-1883 by the International Polar Expedition to Point Barrow, Alaska, where some starfish of the genus Asterias were collected at a depth of 7 fathoms on a pebbly seabed just off of Port Clarence. The species was first described by Verrill as Allasterias rathbuni in 1909 as the type species for his new genus Allasterias. He commemorated Richard Rathbun, curator of marine invertebrates at the United States National Museum, in the specific epithet. He described three varieties: the nominate, var. anomala and var. nortonensis (named after the Norton Sound in Alaska). The variety anomala was described by Verrill in this 1909 work from St. Michael Island in the southeast of Norton Sound. In 1914 Verrill raised var. anomala to an independent species, Allasterias anomala. In 1923 Walter Kenrick Fisher synonymised Allasterias with Asterias, and in 1930 synonymised anomala, rathbuni and rathbuni var. nortonensis with Asterias amurensis. In 1950 Alexander Michailovitsch Djakonov reinstated the taxon as A. rathbuni, and subsumed A. anomala under A. rathbuni as forma anomala, accepting all other of Verrill's forms. Fisher synonymised the variety nortonensis with A. amurensis in 1930; the World Register of Marine Species maintains this classification despite following Djakonov's recognition of the variety as a form of A. rathbuni, and Jangoux and Lawrence also largely following Djakonov.

=== Intraspecific variation ===
Verrill originally recognised three varieties in 1909: the nominate, var. anomala and var. nortonensis. Fisher considered all three to be synonyms of Asterias amurensis sensu stricto. Regarding var. nortonensis, he stated that it is only known from five specimens recovered from Norton Bay in Alaska, these varied in spination, with the type being the most divergent among them (the only specimen Verrill was able examine), but all within the diversity to Russian specimens of A. amurensis, and thus maintaining recognition for this taxon was unwarranted. In 1950 Djakonov described one new subspecies, crassispinis, and recognised four formae of the nominate subspecies: the nominate, alveolata, anomala and nortonensis. Jangoux and Lawrence followed Djakonov in 2001, but recognised f. anomala as a synonym of the nominate, and classed alveolata and nortonensis as varieties of A. rathbuni ssp. rathbuni.

Two subspecies are accepted in the World Register of Marine Species by Christopher Mah as of 2008:

- A. rathbuni ssp. rathbuni (Verrill, 1909)
- A. rathbuni ssp. crassispinis Djakonov, 1950 - Found in the Sea of Okhotsk and around Sakhalin. The arm length is up to 14.6cm.

== Description ==
This starfish has five arms, broad at the base but tapering to acute tips, four times as long as broad. The central disc of specimens preserved by drying is rather broad. The dorsal skeleton is reticulated and rather weak, thus specimens preserved in alcohol are soft and flaccid. There are numerous small pedicellariae on both the dorsal and lateral surfaces. There are also many small papulae and small and numerous spines on the dorsal surface. The dorsal surface is entirely covered by an areolate or reticulate pattern; the areolations are 1.5-2mm across. The arm length is up to 17cm; on average, the ratio between the length of the arm and the radius of its disc is 4.3:1. It has planktonic larvae.

=== Similar species ===
Verrill found it a quite distinct Asterias species within its range due to the finely and regularly areolated dorsal surface, the reticulated and flaccid skeleton, and small spines. He found it most resembling Asterias rollestoni, which differs from it by virtue of less dense spines near the mouth, but longer and larger spines dorsally and marginally, and larger and more numerous pedicellariae. Compared with A. versicolor it has much more numerous, though smaller dorsal and lateral spines, these being differently arranged. Compared with A. amurensis, it has more and shorter dorsal spines. Djakonov found it to be the most similar to A. amurensis, and Fisher went further by considering it identical to A. amurensis.

== Distribution and habitat ==
In Russia it is known from the Sea of Okhotsk and Bering Sea, and in the United States around the Aleutian Islands and in Alaska in the Bering Sea. It has been found at depths of 9-170m. Djakonov complies the distribution of Asterias rathbuni f. anomala, now considered a synonym of the nominate type, as off the Kamchatka peninsula and around the Commander Islands, east to the Shumagin Islands off Alaska, north to the Chukchi Sea, usually at depths of 20m, but in America specimens have been recovered down to 170m. The anomala form was originally recovered off St. Michael Island in the southeast of Norton Sound, Alaska.

Asterias rathbuni f. alveolata was first recovered in 1910 at a depth of 53m from a gravelly sea bottom in the Karaginsky Gulf in the Bering Sea off the northeastern Kamchatka peninsula. A. rathbuni f. nortonensis was found in the Norton Sound off Alaska, and has not been found elsewhere.

Asterias rathbuni subsp. crassispinus is known from the Sea of Okhotsk and around Sakhalin.
