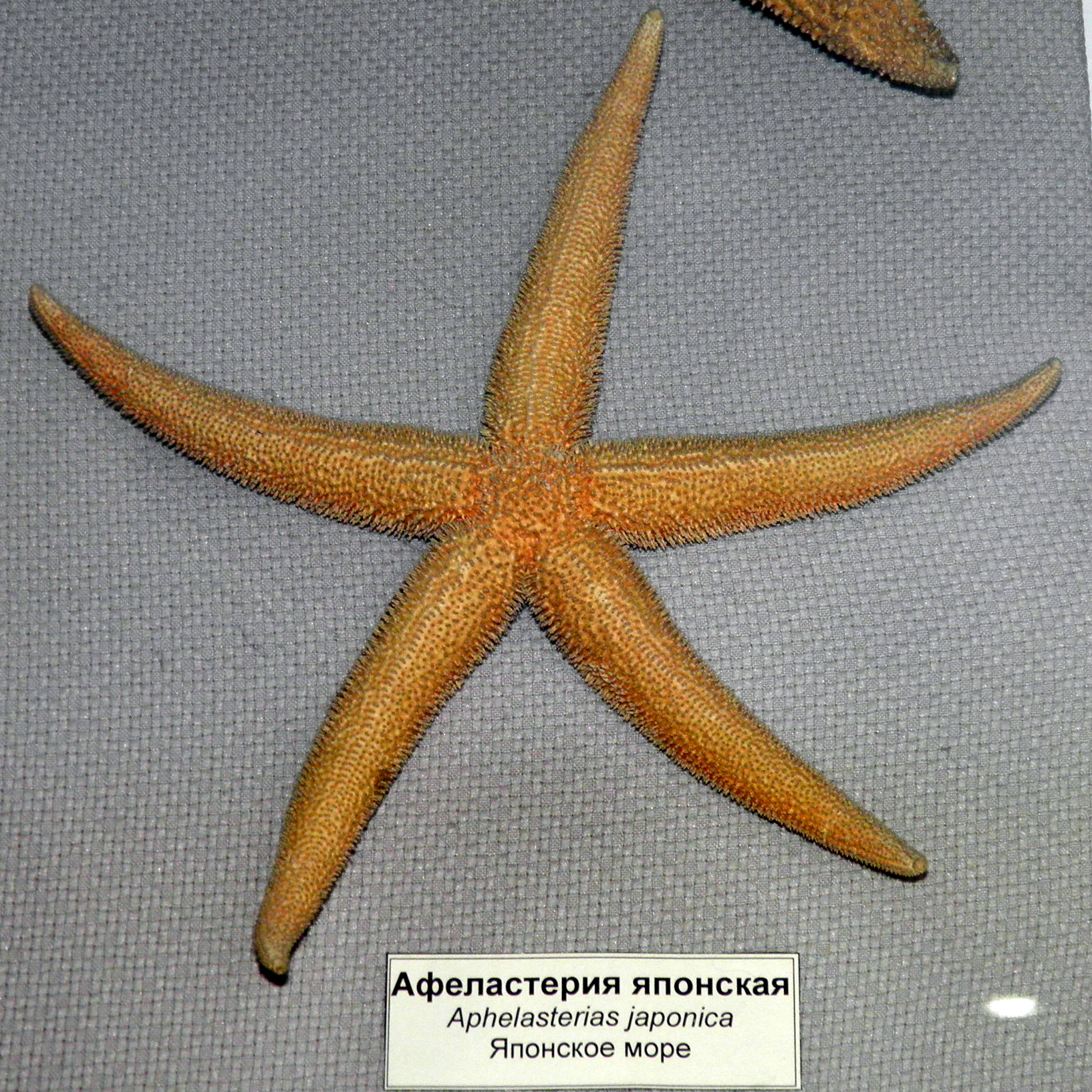
- An Aphelasterias japonica

Scientific classification
- Kingdom: Animalia
- Phylum: Echinodermata
- Class: Asteroidea
- Order: Forcipulatida
- Family: Asteriidae
- Genus: Aphelasterias
- Species: A. japonica

Binomial name
- Aphelasterias japonica (Bell, 1881)

= Aphelasterias japonica =

Species of starfish

Aphelasterias japonica is a species of sea star in the family Asteriidae that is native to the northwestern Pacific Ocean. It is found in coastal marine environments in Japan and surrounding regions, where it acts as a benthic predator and is associated with a variety of substrates and habitats.

The species has been studied for its reproductive biology, immune system, and production of bioactive compounds.

== Taxonomy ==
Aphelasterias japonica was first described by Francis Jeffrey Bell in 1881. It belongs to the phylum Echinodermata and class Asteroidea, which includes sea stars. The species is classified within the order Forcipulatida and the family Asteriidae, which are a group of predatory sea stars found in marine environments worldwide.

Taxonomic databases recognize A. japonica as a valid species, with synonyms including ''Asterias japonica'' and ''Asterias torquata''.

== Description ==
Aphelasterias japonica is a medium sized sea star that has five elongated arms extending from a small central disc. Individuals can reach approximately 20-30 cm in diameter. The aboral (upper) surface is reddish to pink, while the oral surface is lighter in color.

The body surface contains small spines and pedicellariae, which are structures found in sea stars and are used for protection and cleaning the body surface. It uses tube feet (podia), located along ambulacral grooves, for movement and feeding.

== Distribution and habitat ==
Aphelasterias japonica is native to the northwestern Pacific Ocean and has been recorded along the coastal waters of Japan and the Russian Far East. It occurs across a broad range, from intertidal and subtidal zones to depths of up to 300m, but is most found around 5-20 meters within water temperatures of 10-25 °C.

The species inhabits a wide range of habitats, including rocky, sandy and muddy substrates, as well as gravel beds. It is also found in more complex habitats like kelp forests, coralline algae beds, and shellfish reefs.

== Ecology and behavior ==
Aphelasterias japonica is a mobile benthic predator that feeds mainly on mollusks and other echinoderms such as clams, sea cucumbers, and sea urchins. Like other sea stars, it captures prey using its tube feet and digests food externally by everting its cardiac stomach. This allows it to break down and consume organisms with hard shells that would otherwise be difficult to eat.

The ability of A. japonica to move through different substrates allows it to take advantage of patchy food resources and find a variety of prey species. It contributes to trophic interactions between predator and prey populations within its coastal marine ecosystems.

In addition to direct predation, A. japonica produces bioactive chemical compounds known as asterosaponins, which function as part of its chemical defense system. These compounds have been shown to cause toxic effects on marine organisms under experimental conditions, including embryotoxic and cardiotoxic effects in fish models.

These results suggest that the ecological impact of A. japonica is not only based on its feeding behavior. Its chemical defenses may also influence how it interacts with other organisms and its surrounding environment. Outbreaks of sea stars with strong chemical and physical defenses have been associated with disruptions in marine ecosystems and economic losses in aquaculture systems.

In areas with high densities of shellfish, A. japonica has been associated with damage to aquaculture operations through both direct predation and the chemicals they produce. The combined effects of predation and defenses explains how A. japonica negatively affects the shellfish culture in Japan.

== Reproduction and development ==
Reproduction in A. japonica occurs through broadcast spawning, where gametes are released into the water column and fertilization occurs externally. Spawning is seasonal and has been recorded from late summer through autumn in different parts of its range.

At the molecular level, reproduction is regulated by hormonal signaling pathways. A relaxin-like gonad-stimulating peptide (RGP) acts as a gonadotropin and stimulates ovarian tissue to produce 1-methyladenine, which induces oocyte maturation and ovulation. The role of 1-methyladenine as a maturation-inducing hormone has been well established in starfish.

After fertilization, embryos develop into gastrulae and then into planktonic bipinnaria larvae, which represent the primary feeding stage. These larvae use ciliary bands for movement and feeding on suspended particles in the water column. In many sea stars, this stage is followed by a brachiolaria larva before settlement and metamorphosis into the juvenile form.

Experimental studies have investigated early developmental processes in laboratory conditions, which provide insight into cellular control mechanisms during development.

== Physiology and cell biology ==
The coelomic fluid of A. japonica contains coelomocytes, which play an important role in immune defense and wound response. These cells show a wide range of morphologies, including amoeboid and irregular forms that are associated with phagocytic activity, meaning they help break down cellular debris or foreign material, and help with wound healing. These processes are necessary for maintaining homeostasis.

Quantitative analyses using morphometric and fractal approaches have identified multiple coelomocyte types based on characteristics such as size, symmetry, and spatial complexity. These differences are interpreted as reflecting functional variation, including roles in pathogen recognition and removal of cellular debris. Meaning that coelomocytes play an important role in maintaining homeostasis and responding to environmental stress.

== Biochemistry ==
Aphelasterias japonica produces a wide range of steroidal secondary metabolites, including asterosaponin and ophidianoside-type glycosides, which are commonly found in starfish reproductive tissues. These compounds have been studied for biological activity, including cytotoxic, antimicrobial, and anti-inflammatory effects.

The presence of these bioactive properties suggests that they may function as part of a chemical defense system, helping to protect the organism from predation, microbial infection, or environmental stress.

Experimental studies have shown that asterosaponins can produce toxic effects in marine organisms, including embryotoxic and cardiotoxic responses in fish models. These findings support the idea that these compounds are not only chemically diverse, but also biologically active in ways that may influence its interactions with other organisms and their environments.

Lipid studies have also identified gangliosides, which are components of cell membranes involved in signaling processes, with unusual structural features including unique linkages between sialic acid residues. The difference being a linkage which involves the hydroxy group (-OH) of the glycolic acid between 8-0-methyl-N-glycolylneuraminic acid residue to the subterminal N-glycolylneuraminic acid residue. While the exact role of this difference in the linkage from other starfish species is less understood, these structural features are relatively uncommon and suggest specialized biochemical adaptations in this species.

Overall, the diversity of secondary metabolites in A. japonica supports their role in chemical defense and explains how biochemical processes are linked to its ecological impact in marine environments.

== Research significance ==
Aphelasterias japonica has been used in studies of marine invertebrate physiology and research on hormone-regulated reproduction and oocyte maturation. The identification of RGP and its role in inducing 1-methyladenine production has helped improve understanding of endocrine regulation in echinoderms.

The species is also used in studies of immune cell structure and function, especially in analyses of coelomocyte diversity and structure. Because of the studies on its reproductive signaling pathways, immune cell diversity, and production of bioactive compounds, A. japonica serves as a model for linking molecular, physiological, and ecological processes in marine invertebrates.

In addition, the bioactive compounds produced by A. japonica have been studied in the marine natural product research, contributing to the understanding of biologically active molecules and their potential applications in pharmacology.
