= Asterias argonauta =

Scientific classification
- Domain: Eukaryota
- Kingdom: Animalia
- Phylum: Echinodermata
- Class: Asteroidea
- Order: Forcipulatida
- Family: Asteriidae
- Genus: Asterias
- Species: A. argonauta

Binomial name
- Asterias argonauta Djakonov, 1950

Species of starfish

Asterias argonauta is a starfish native to the Pacific coasts of Far East Russia.

The species was first described by Alexander Michailovitsch Djakonov in 1950, with the holotype collected in 1925 in the Peter the Great Gulf of the Sea of Japan near the Basargin Lighthouse, at a depth of 20m in the waters off Primorsky Krai.

It has also been recovered in Chemulpo Bay, in northwestern South Korea.

It has been found on silty sand or pebble substrates. It has been found at depths of 1-32m.

== Description ==
This starfish has five arms. The arms grow to 14.6cm, the ratio between the length of the arm and the radius of its disc is 4:1. It has planktonic larvae. Djakonov found it to be the most similar to Asterias rollestoni.
