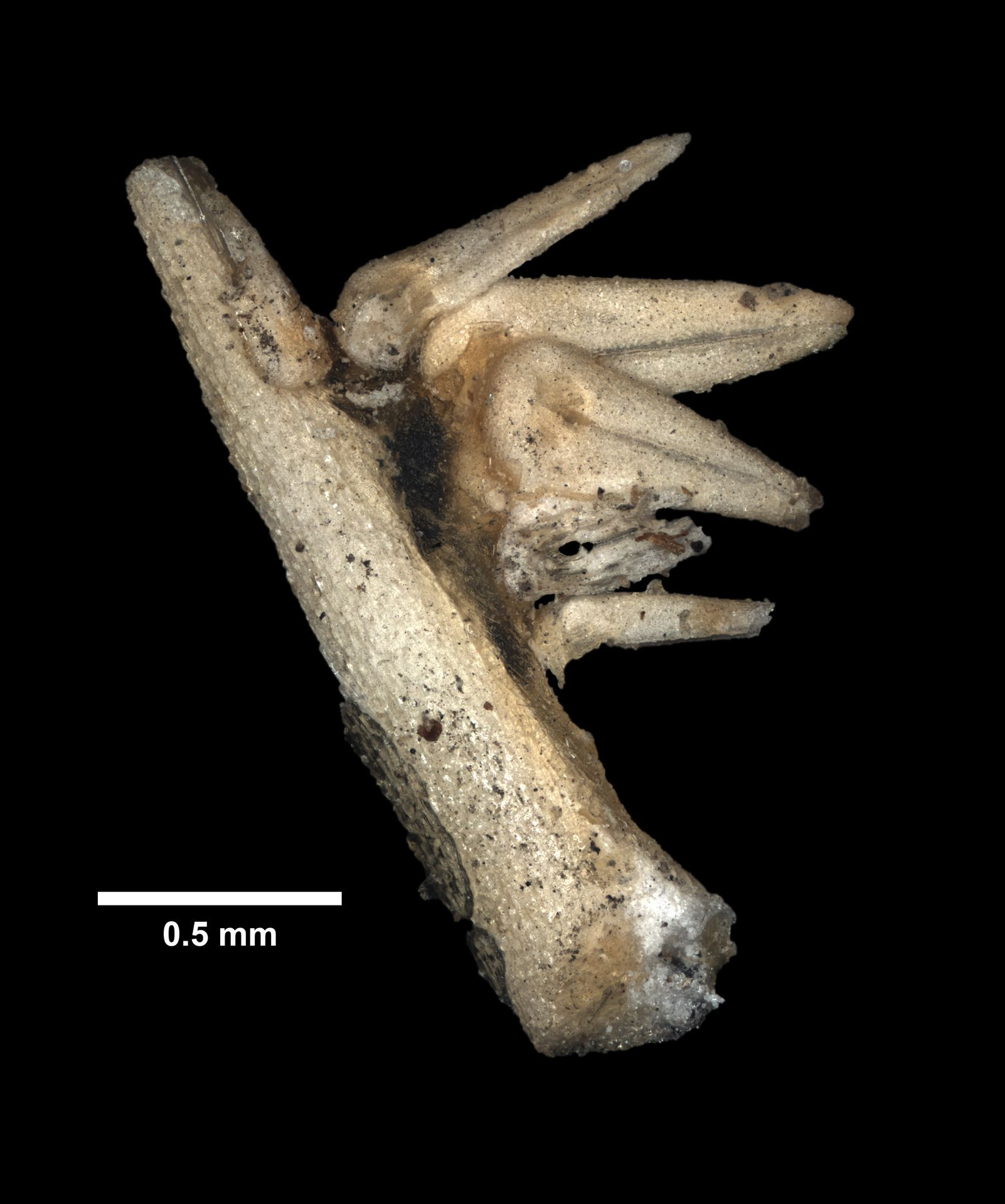

Scientific classification
- Kingdom: Animalia
- Phylum: Echinodermata
- Class: Asteroidea
- Order: Forcipulatida
- Family: Asteriidae
- Genus: Asterias
- Species: A. rollestoni

Binomial name
- Asterias rollestoni Bell, 1881

Synonyms
- Allasterias forficulosa Verrill, 1914; Asterias amurensis f. rollestoni (Bell, 1881) Fisher, 1930

= Asterias rollestoni =

Species of starfish

Asterias rollestoni is a common starfish native to the seas of China and Japan, and not known from the far north or the American coasts of the eastern Pacific.

== Taxonomy ==
It was first described by Francis Jeffrey Bell in 1881 from a collection made before 1873 in Japanese waters. A synonym, Allasterias forficulosa, was described by Addison Emery Verrill in 1914 from a collection made in Japan in 1913 (see image). In 1930 Walter Kenrick Fisher subsumed it as a forma of Asterias amurensis, and further stated that A. rollestoni might well intergrade with A. versicolor to the south of its range. He synonymised Verrill's Allasterias forficulosa with his A. amurensis f. rollestoni and stated Sladen's specimens of A. amurensis also belonged to this form. In 1936, and subsequently in 1940, Ryori Hayashi followed Fisher's interpretation, in 1940 even subsuming Asterias versicolor as a form of A. amurensis. In 1950, however, Alexander Michailovitsch Djakonov recognized it as a full species again. Subsequent authors such as Djakonov (1958), Baranova & Wu (1962), Chang & Liao (1964), Baranova (1971) and Jangoux & Lawrence (2001) upheld this interpretation.

== Description ==
It has five arms and a moderately-sized central disc. The arm length is up to 12 cm; the ratio between the length of the arm and the radius of its disc is usually 4:1 to 4.5:1. It has planktonic larvae.

In 1914 Verrill found it most resembling A. rathbuni, from which it differs by virtue of less dense spines near the mouth, but longer and larger spines dorsally and marginally, and larger and more numerous pedicellaria. He states it is to a lesser degree similar to A. versicolor, differing from this species by having more spines and longer and sharper pedicellaria, but at the same time also considered Allasterias forficulosa, a taxon he created in 1914 but now considered a synonym of Asterias rollestoni, closer resembling to A. versicolor. In 1930 Fisher stated that Asterias rollestoni might well intergrade with A. versicolor to the south of its range, and in 1940 Hayashi also found it to be most closely related to A. versicolor.

== Distribution and habitat ==
According to Djakonov it has been collected at depths of 5-96m. It is found in the littoral zone from the east in the seas around Japan, west to the Sea of Japan and further to the Yellow Sea, and north through the Peter the Great Gulf (Primorsky Krai) to off the coast of De-Kastri in Khabarovsk Krai. It is among the most common starfish of Chinese seawaters.

== Behaviour ==
Asterias rollestoni can grow back its limbs should it lose them. This begins four days after amputation, when cells near the end of the stump de-differentiate and migrate to the wound where they form a thickened skin which gradually re-differentiates into mature tissue.

== Uses ==
It is considered useful in traditional medicine in China and is in the 2015 Pharmacopoeia of the People's Republic of China.
