= Aphelasterias changfengyingi =

Scientific classification
- Kingdom: Animalia
- Phylum: Echinodermata
- Class: Asteroidea
- Order: Forcipulatida
- Family: Asteriidae
- Genus: Aphelasterias
- Species: A. changfengyingi

Binomial name
- Aphelasterias changfengyingi Baranova & Wu, 1962

Species of starfish

Aphelasterias changfengyingi is a species of starfish in the genus Aphelasterias discovered by Zoja Ivanovna Baranova and one other.

== Distribution ==
Aphelasterias changfengyingi can be found around the Yellow Sea.
