= Aphelasterias =

Scientific classification
- Kingdom: Animalia
- Phylum: Echinodermata
- Class: Asteroidea
- Order: Forcipulatida
- Family: Asteriidae
- Genus: Aphelasterias; Fisher, 1923

Genus of starfishes

Aphelasterias is a genus of starfish in the family Asteriidae.

== Species ==
- Aphelasterias changfengyingi'
- Aphelasterias japonica
