= Northern Pacific seastar in Australia =

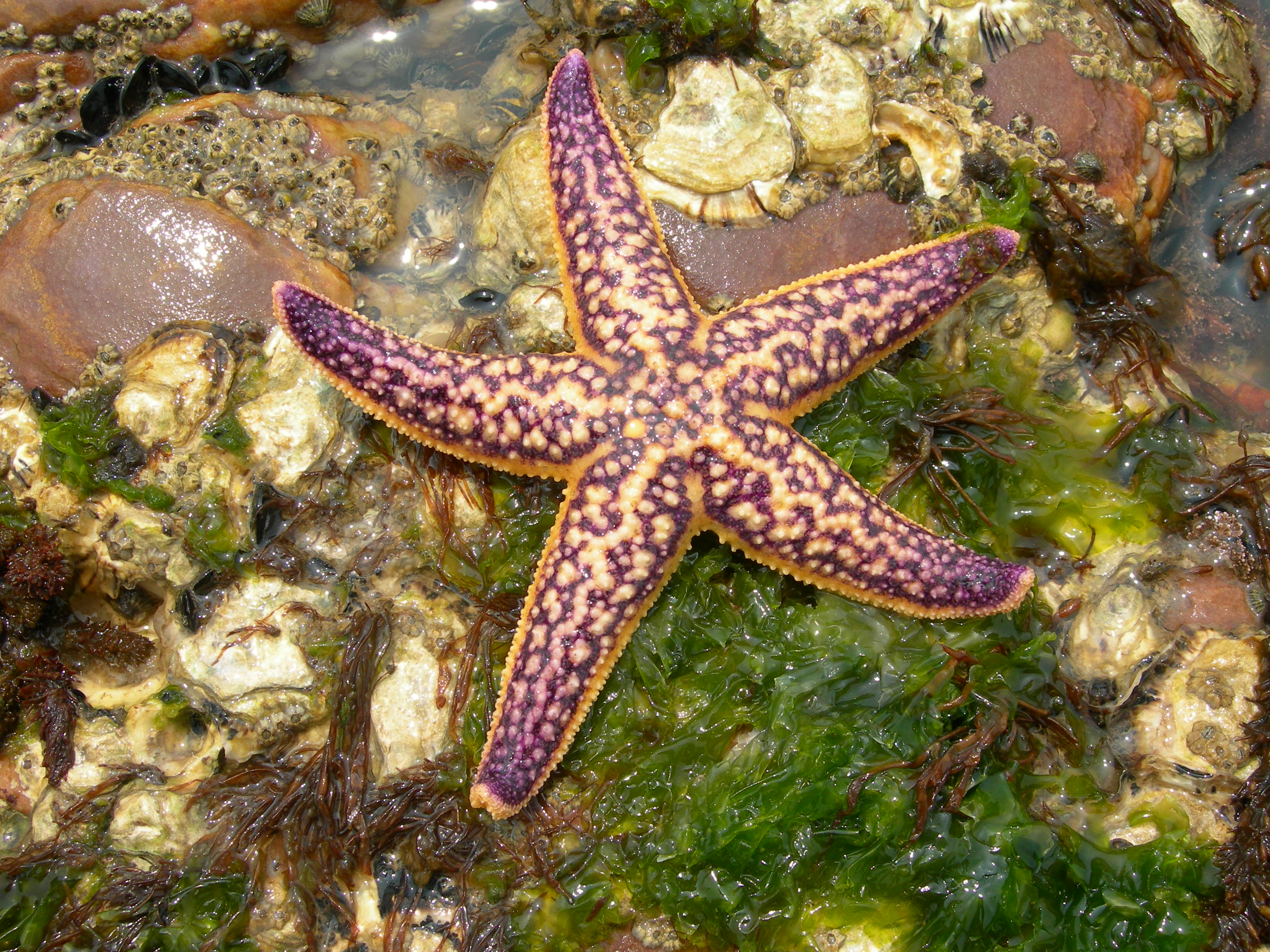
The Northern Pacific starfish (Asterias amurensis).

The Northern Pacific seastar (Asterias amurensis) is an invasive species in Australia.

== Background ==
This seastar is native to the coasts of northern China, North Korea, South Korea, Russia and Japan, and distribution of this species into other countries has increased. It is on the Invasive Species Specialist Group list of the world's 100 worst invasive species. They can be transmitted to waters around the world via seawater in live fish trade, via recreational boats, in ballast water, and on the hulls of ships.

The species prefers water temperatures of 7°C to 10°C, but it has adapted to Australian waters of around 22°C, and usually found in shallow waters of protected coasts. It is able to tolerate a wide range of temperature and salinity, so is frequently found in estuaries and on muddy, sandy or rocky sheltered areas of intertidal zones.

== Detection, habitat and behaviour in Australia ==
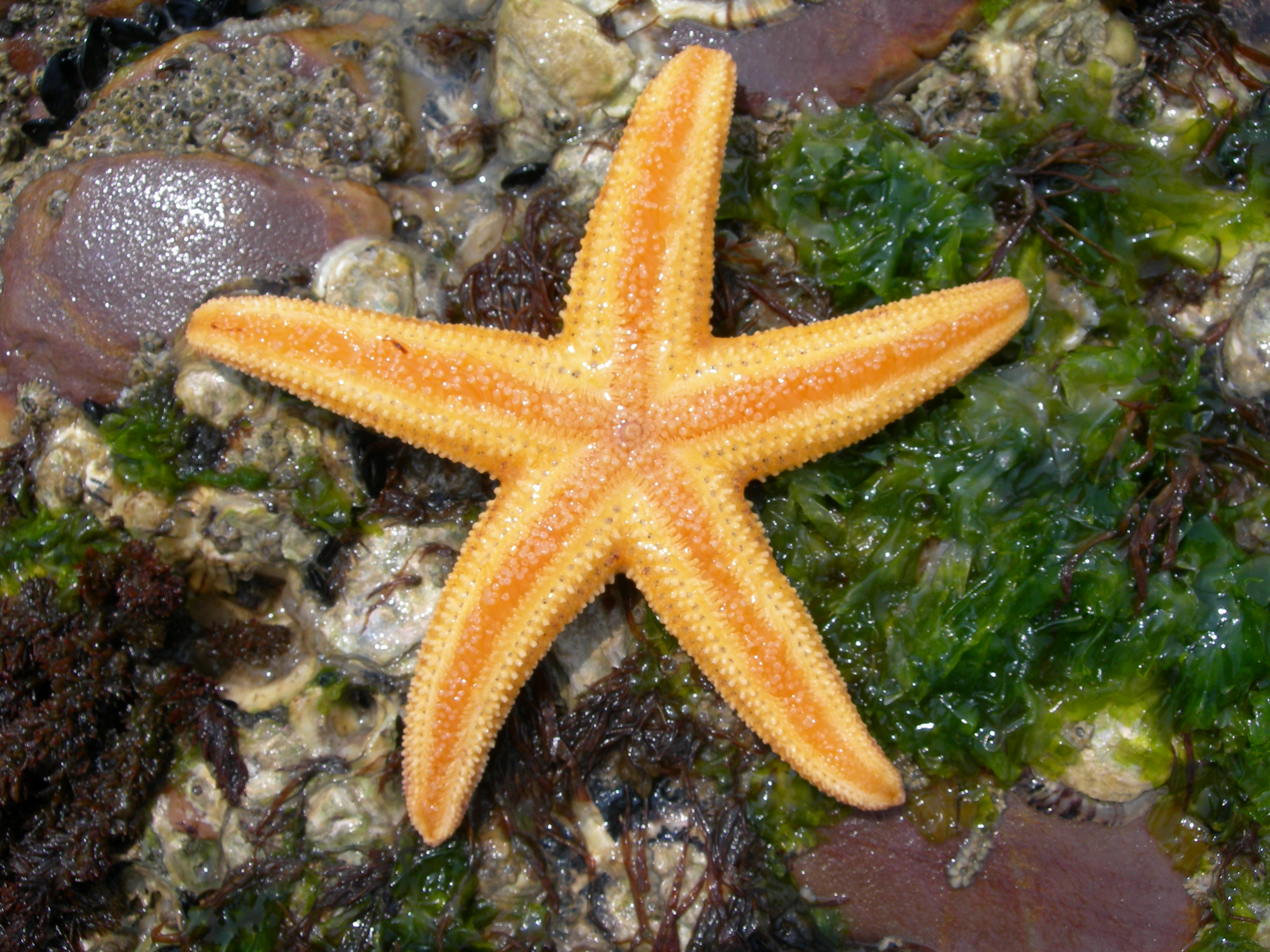
Asterias amurensis, ventral view

Asterias amurensis was first seen in Tasmanian coastal waters in 1986. Their presence has been recorded in the state from as far north as Banks Strait (between Cape Portland and Clarke Island) and south to Recherche Bay, with the highest population densities in sheltered waters in south-east Tasmania, particularly the Derwent Estuary.

It then spread northwards, and was detected in Port Philip Bay, Victoria, where it was observed to reach up to 12 million individuals over a two-year span, and is now considered established there. It has also been seen in San Remo, Anderson Inlet, Waratah Bay, Tidal River and the Gippsland Lakes area, but measures are being taken to ensure that they do not get established in these areas.

In Australian waters, spawning occurs between July and October, and the female seastar can carry 10 to 25 million eggs. It is a voracious predator, consuming bivalves, gastropod molluscs, barnacles, crustaceans, sea worms, echinoderms, ascidians, sea urchins, sea squirts and other seastars, including those of its own species if other supplies are exhausted. Its preferred foods are clams, mussels and scallops, but will also eat dead fish and fish waste.

Although the species prefers shallow, sheltered areas, it has also been observed in other habitats, including on rocky reefs and bedrock, and, in its native range around Japan, at depths of up to 200 metres (660 ft).

== Impact ==
The Northern Pacific seastar is considered a serious pest of native marine organisms in Australia, and is a major factor in the decline of the critically endangered spotted handfish. It preys on the handfish eggs, and/or on the sea squirts (ascidians) that help to form the substrate that the fish spawn on. It is also considered a mariculture pest, as it settles on the lines used to grow scallops, mussels and oysters, as well as salmon cages.

In 2005, a two-year study identified Asterias amurensis as "one of the ten most damaging potential domestic target species, based on overall impact potential (economic and environmental)", and as having a "reasonably high impact/or invasion potential".

== Management ==
The species is listed on the National Introduced Marine Pest Coordinating System (NIMPIS), a website which provides information on "the biology, ecology and the distribution of marine pests either established or that pose a risk of future introduction to Australia".

A. amurensis is included in Australia’s Priority Marine Pest List, and in 2019 was listed as an Australian pest species of national priority, owing to its impacts on aquaculture, commercial shellfish industries and its impact on the critically endangered spotted handfish (Brachionichthys hirsutus).

The only native species observed to predate on this seastar in the wild in Australia is the native spider crab Leptomithrax gaimardii in the Derwent Estuary. However, laboratory studies showed predation smaller ones by Coscinasterias muricata. This has been viewed as a possible future method of biocontrol of newly-established populations in Victoria. Immersion in freshwater has been shown to kill the larvae, and this is a potential method of control, and commercial harvesting of the animal where populations are established has been mooted, but there are problems associated with this idea, including the lack of a market for the fertiliser produced from them. Other methods considered and/or tried have been dredging, the use of quicklime (calcium oxide) to poison them, netting, trapping and manual removal; however, none of these has proven successful and effective, for a range of reasons. Members of the public are encouraged to report sightings of the animal to the authorities.

Marine biologists hope that diseases or sterile seastars may be introduced in the future.

=== Volunteer efforts ===
Volunteer divers have been trying to reduce the Tasmanian population of the seastar in the Derwent River since it became established there. Efforts of this kind in 1993 resulted in the collection of more than 30,000 seastars. However, many of the seastars that were captured were cut up and thrown back into the sea, and it was later found that each part that was thrown back was able to regenerate and grow a new organism, so long as it had part of the central disc remaining.

As of 2021 a new push is being led by local diver Benni Vincent, who intends to organise two to three dives a month over a period of three to five years, concentrating on the areas where the populations are highest, as well as in areas where the handfish live.
