= Asterias microdiscus =

Scientific classification
- Domain: Eukaryota
- Kingdom: Animalia
- Phylum: Echinodermata
- Class: Asteroidea
- Order: Forcipulatida
- Family: Asteriidae
- Genus: Asterias
- Species: A. microdiscus

Binomial name
- Asterias microdiscus Djakonov, 1950

Species of starfish

Asterias microdiscus is a starfish native to the Pacific coasts of Far East Russia.

The species was first described by Alexander Michailovitsch Djakonov in 1950 with the holotype collected in Avacha Bay in the Pacific Ocean, off the southeastern coast of the Kamchatka Peninsula, at a depth of 18m in 6.5°C water, in 1912. Djakonov also named a forma brandtii.

It has also been recovered around Karaginsky Island.

The holotype was found on a silt substrate. It has been found at depths of 3-10m, perhaps 18m.

== Description ==
This starfish has five arms. It has an arm length to 8cm; the ratio between the length of the arm and the radius of its disc is 4.5:1. It has planktonic larvae.
