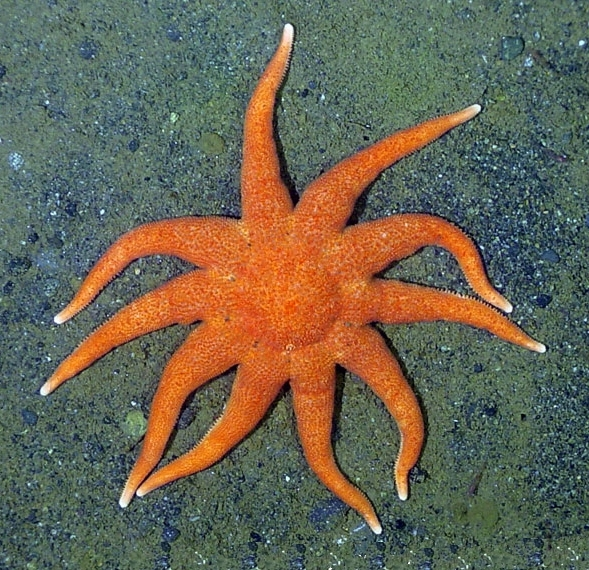

Scientific classification
- Kingdom: Animalia
- Phylum: Echinodermata
- Class: Asteroidea
- Order: Valvatida
- Family: Solasteridae
- Genus: Solaster
- Species: S. paxillatus

Binomial name
- Solaster paxillatus Sladen, 1889

= Solaster paxillatus =

Species of starfish

Solaster paxillatus, the orange sun star, is a species of starfish found at varying depths in the northern Pacific Ocean. It is a natural predator of the starfish Asterias amurensis.

== Description ==
The orange sun star has a somewhat inflated appearance (especially after it has recently fed) and eight to ten long arms with tapering tips. It grows to a diameter of about 37 centimetres (15 in). The aboral (upper) surface is covered with plates, each bearing fifteen to thirty small, blunt spinelets known as paxillae. These are arranged in oblique rows along the arms and outer part of the disc. Along the sides of the arms, the plates have four lobes. The colour of the aboral surface varies from yellow and pale orange to brick red, and deep water individuals may be violet. The oral (under) surface is a paler colour and has two rows of white tube feet on either side of the ambulacral groove which runs along the centre of each arm. The mouth is surrounded by distinctive, shovel-shaped plates.

== Distribution ==
The orange sun star is found in the northern Pacific Ocean, its range extending from Japan and the Bering Sea and along the North American coast as far south as California. With a depth range of between 11 and 3,740 metres (36 and 12,270 ft), it occurs at greater depths than any other starfish in the north west Pacific.

== Ecology ==
The feeding habits of the orange sun star are not well known, but examination of the stomach contents has found the remains of sea cucumbers and of the blood star, (Henricia leviuscula). In Japan, it feeds on the sea urchin Strongylocentrotus nudus and the northern Pacific seastar (Asterias amurensis).
