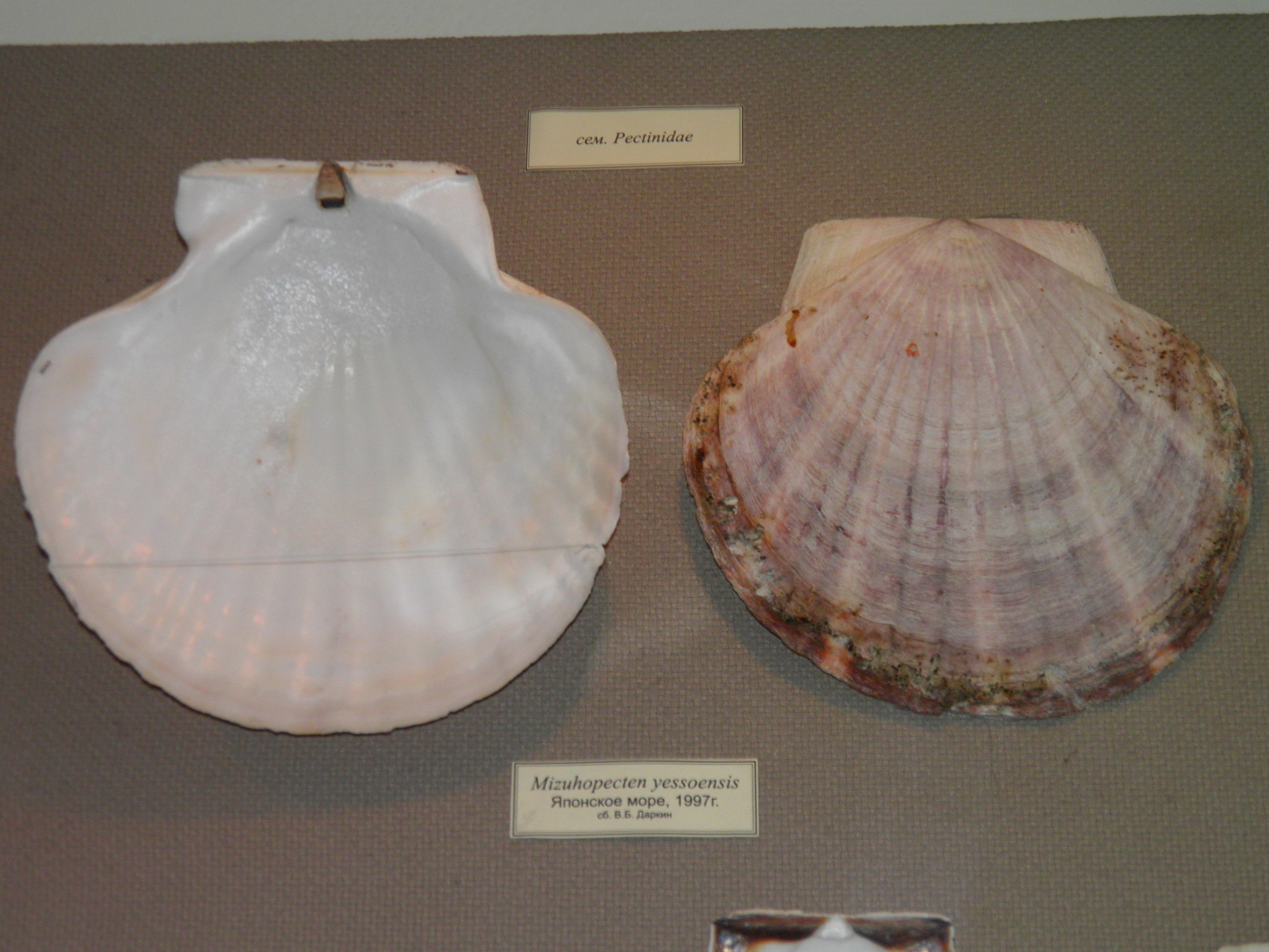
- Mizuhopecten yessoensis

Scientific classification
- Kingdom: Animalia
- Phylum: Mollusca
- Class: Bivalvia
- Order: Pectinida
- Family: Pectinidae
- Genus: Mizuhopecten; Masuda, 1963

= Mizuhopecten =

Genus of bivalves

Mizuhopecten is a genus of bivalves belonging to the family Pectinidae.

The species of this genus are found in Far East Asia.

Species:

- Mizuhopecten kitamiensis Satoru et al., 1966
- †Mizuhopecten tokyoensis (Tokunaga, 1906)
- Mizuhopecten yessoensis (Jay, 1857)
