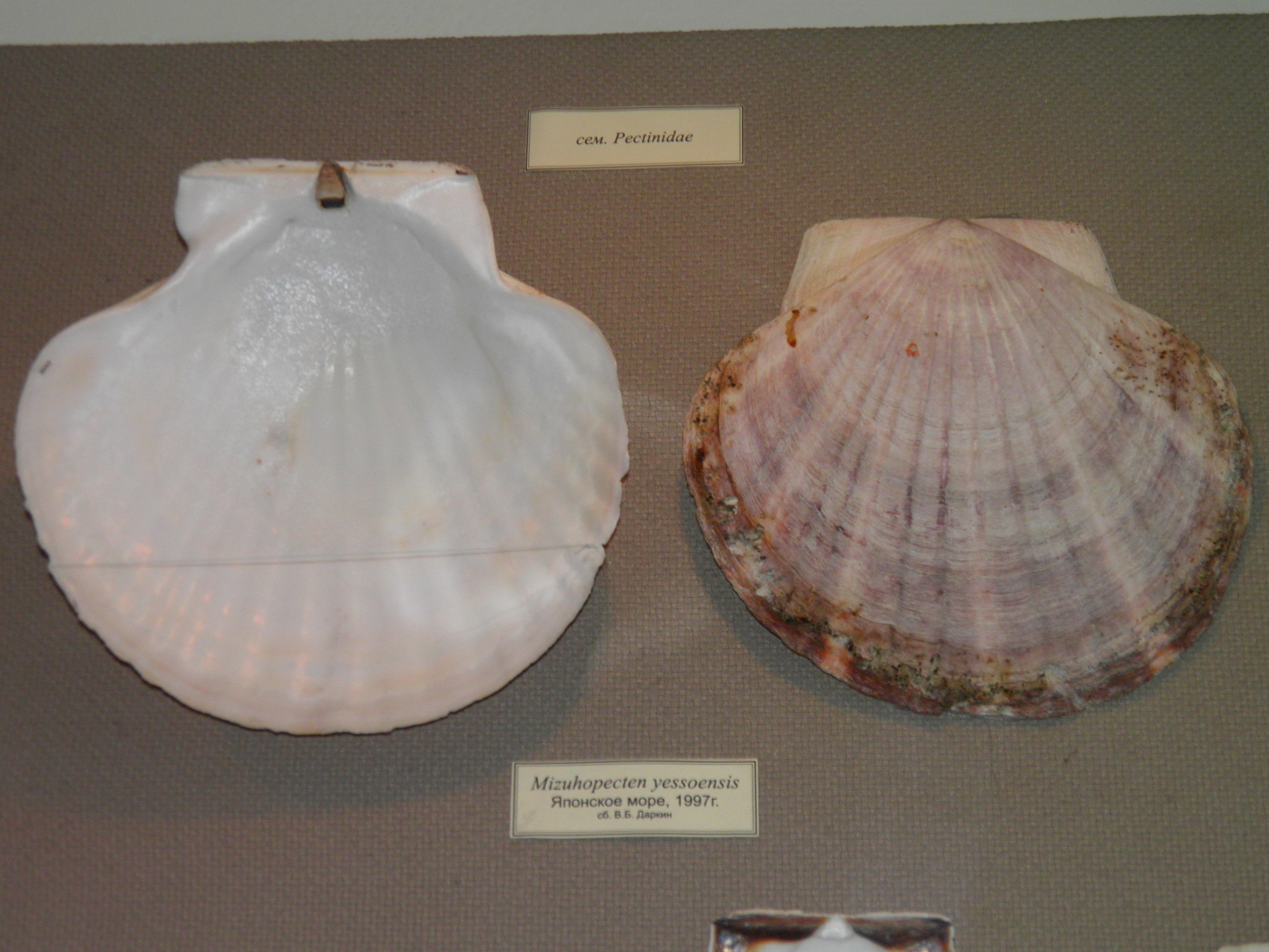

Scientific classification
- Kingdom: Animalia
- Phylum: Mollusca
- Class: Bivalvia
- Order: Pectinida
- Family: Pectinidae
- Genus: Mizuhopecten
- Species: M. yessoensis

Binomial name
- Mizuhopecten yessoensis (Jay, 1857)

Synonyms
- Pecten yessoensis Jay, 1857; Patinopecten yessoensis (Jay, 1857)

= Mizuhopecten yessoensis =

Yesso scallop

Species of mollusc

Mizuhopecten yessoensis (Yesso scallop, giant Ezo scallop) is a species of marine bivalve mollusks in the family Pectinidae, the scallops. Its name Yesso/Ezo refers to its being found north of Japan.

Its tissues bioaccumulate algal yessotoxins and are studied extensively.

== Description ==
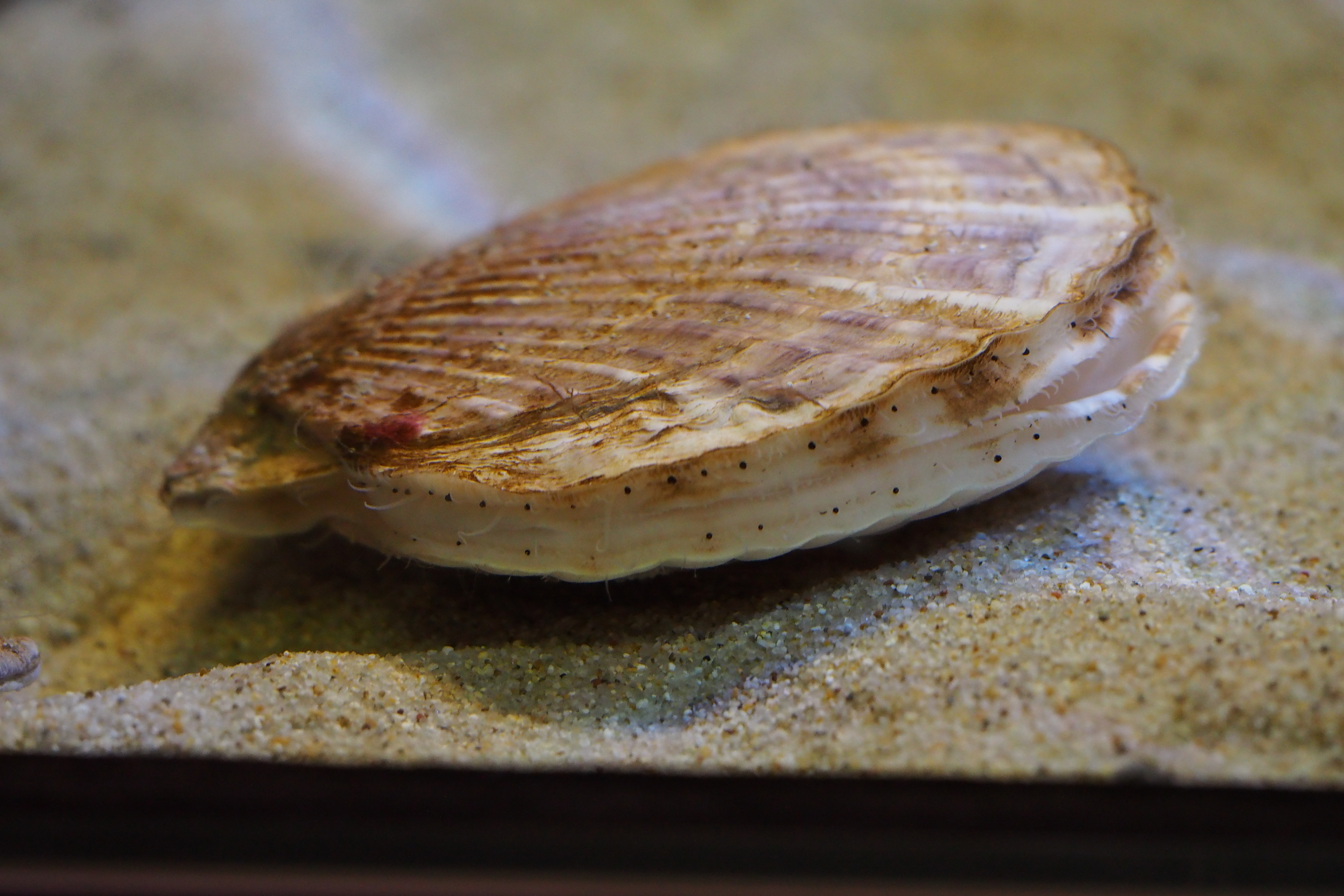
Yesso scallop

The Yesso scallop (Mizuhopecten yessoensis) is a cold water marine bivalve species. The valves have a convex center with a smooth exterior shell. On one side it is white and on the other dark brown.

== Habitat ==
The Yesso scallop is widely distributed along the cold coast of Northern Japan. Scallop cultivation is located in the northern islands of Honshu and Hokkaido, with the Sea of Okhotsk, Saroma Lake and Funka Bay in Hokkaido accounting for more than 80% of the scallop production during the period of 1991 to 2002.

== Ecology and behavior ==
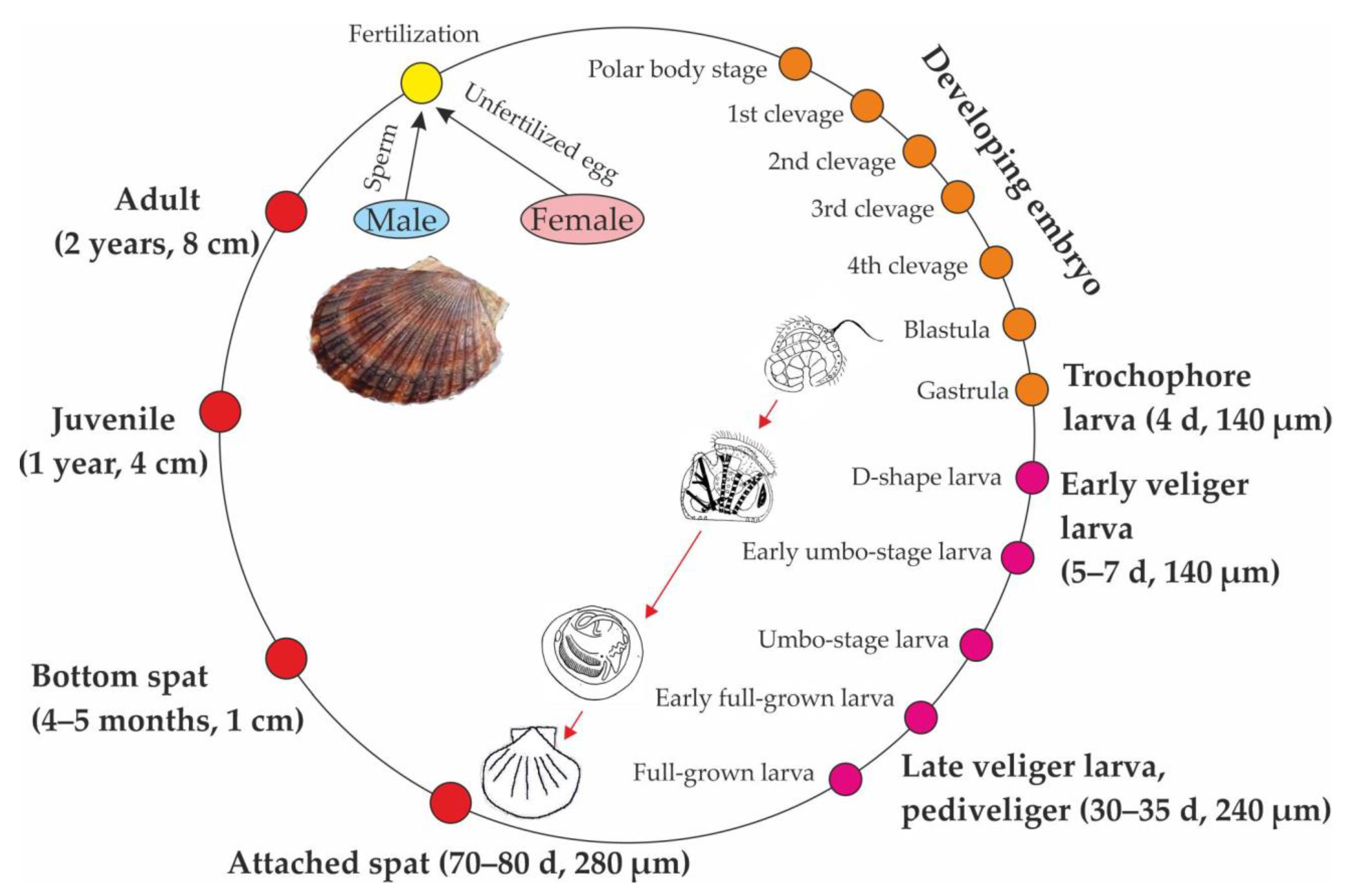
Life cycle of the giant Yesso scallop

Temperature plays a key role in the timing of spawning and larvae settlement of the Yesso scallop. Generally, the scallops spawn between May 1 to June 9 over the span of 10 days. It was found that the timing for the commencement of spawning is shifted to a later date when the surface temperature of the water remains below 0°C for a prolonged period. In addition, lower temperatures throughout April could potentially influence the onset timing of scallop spawning. Furthermore, the shortening of pre-spawning period (dates between the surface water temperature rise above zero to May 1) may be another contributing factor to the later dates of spawning. On the other hand, the timing of scallop spat settlement is closely related to water temperature too; the colder the pre-spawning period, the later the larvae settlement. The commencement of the Yesso Scallop larvae settlement is typically between June 4 to July 5 over the period of 15 days. The upper limit for scallop development was found to be 18°C.

== Development ==
The growth of scallops also varies with the water temperature. When the water is warm and below 18°C, the scallops tend to grow most rapidly between the age of 2 and 4. On the other hand, they often reach the peak of their growing ability between 3 and 5 years of age in colder environments. Consequently, it was established that the Japanese scallop Mizuhopecten yessoensis experiences the lowest mortality rate between the age of 2 and 5. Starting from the age of 6 to 7, the mortality rate rises dramatically.

Capture (blue) and aquaculture (green) production of Yesso scallop (Mizuhopecten yessoensis) in thousand tonnes from 1950 to 2022, as reported by the FAO

== Predation ==
The main predators of the Yesso scallops are the sea stars Asterias amurensis and Distolasterias nipon. The scallops are preyed on one after the other, and it was found that smaller scallops are preferred over larger ones. Scallops found in warmer waters are also more likely to be preyed upon. Due to the morphological differences between D. nipon and A. amurensis, D. nipon had a much greater influence on the predation of the Yesso scallops.

== Diet ==
The scallops depend on sinking organic matter for food, with detritus being their main source of food. These organic matter are from rivers being drained nearby. Another source of food for the scallops are dissolved organic carbon from phytoplankton production.

== As food ==
In Japan, it is known as hotate-gai, and the adductor muscle is eaten raw as sashimi and sushi. In China, it is sometimes dried to make conpoy, usually described as "Japanese conpoy".

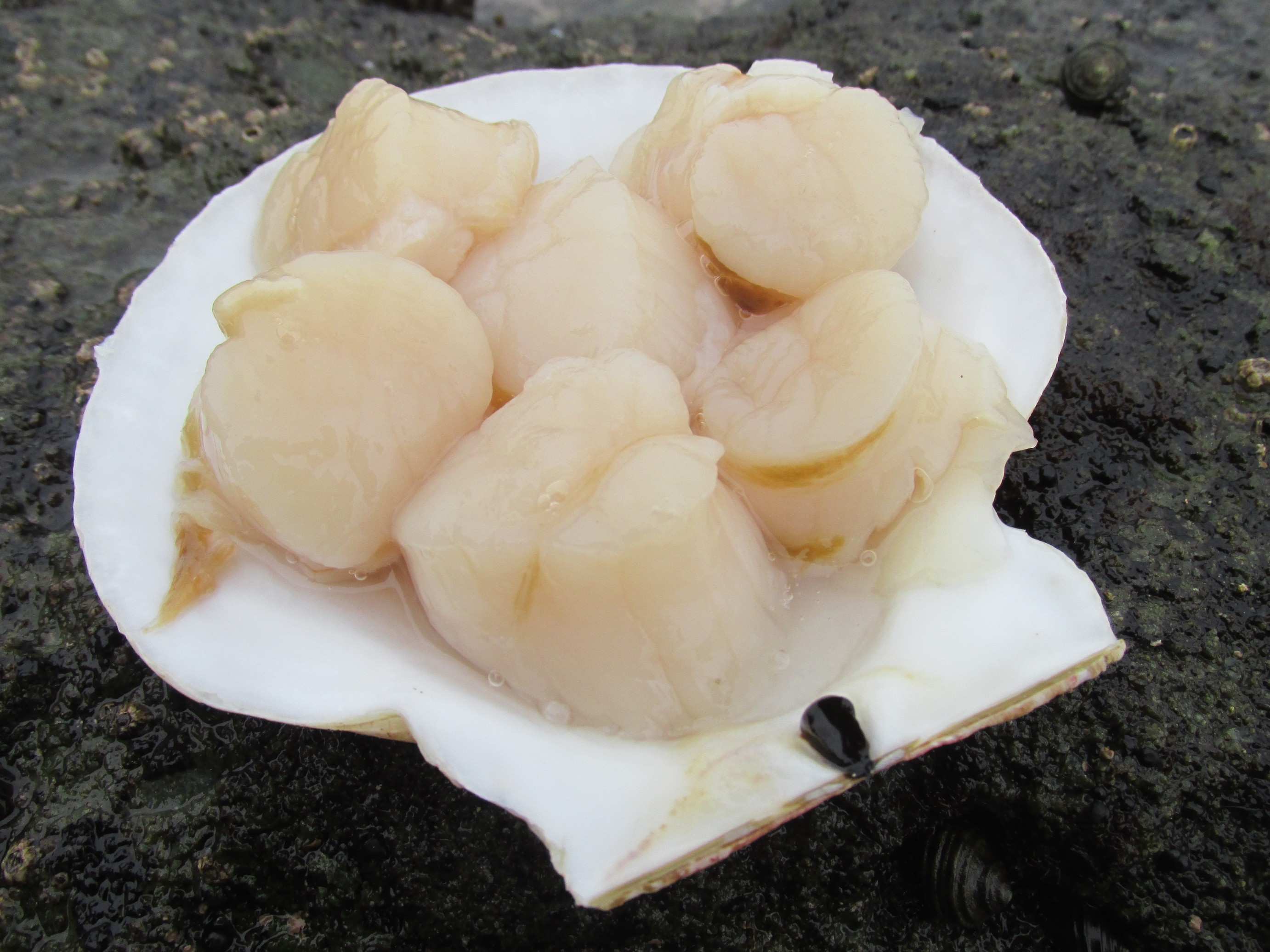
Raw adductor muscles from scallops in Mutsu Bay

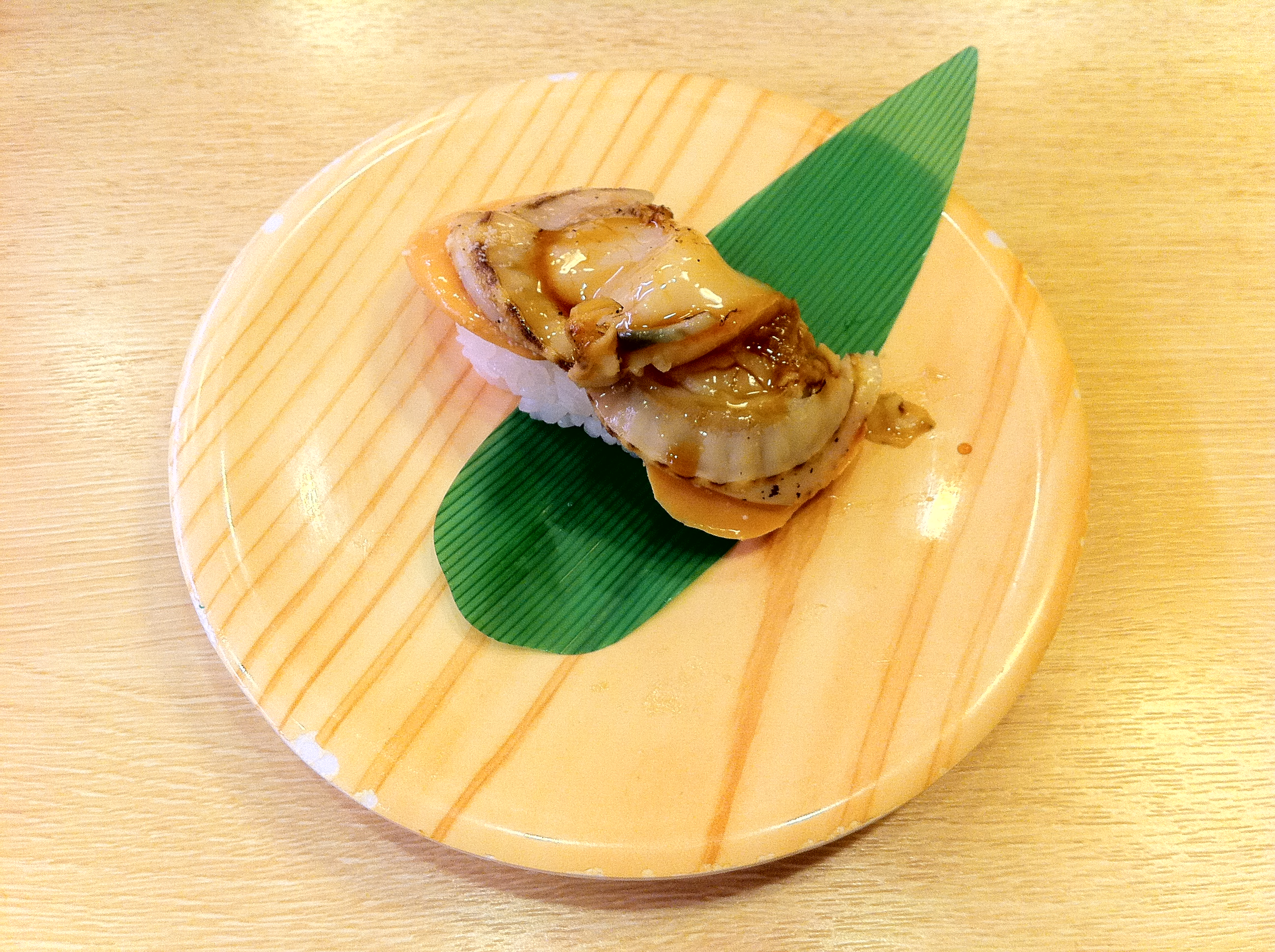
As sushi

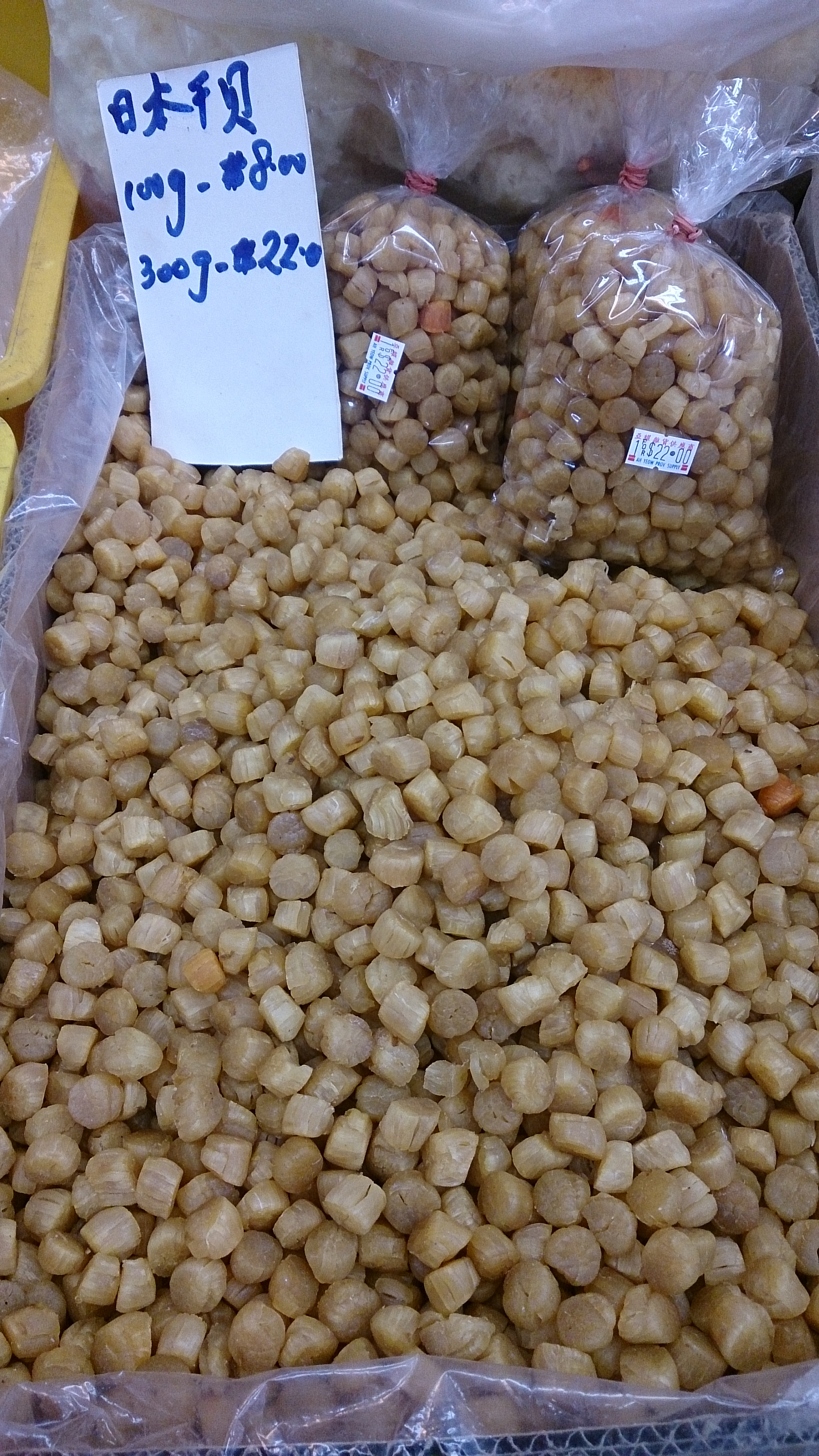
Dried conpoy in Singapore
