= 1-methyladenosine nucleosidase =

Class of enzymes

Identifiers
- EC no.: 3.2.2.13
- CAS no.: 37367-71-8

Databases
- BRENDA: enzyme data
- ExPASy: NiceZyme view
- KEGG: enzyme entry
- MetaCyc: metabolic pathway
- Rhea: reactions
- PDB structures: RCSB PDB PDBe PDBsum
- Gene Ontology: AmiGO / QuickGO
Search
- PMC: articles
- PubMed: articles
- NCBI: proteins

1-methyladenosine nucleosidase (EC 3.2.2.13) is an enzyme characterised from Pisaster ochraceous that catalyzes the hydrolysis of 1-methyladenosine to D-ribose and 1-methyladenine:

1-methyladenosine
H_{2}O
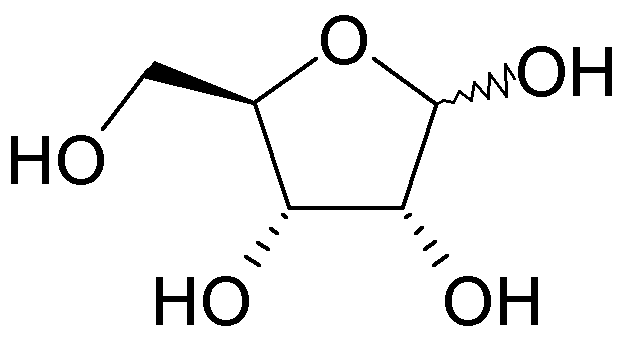
D-ribose
+
1-methyladenine

This enzyme is a hydrolase, specifically a glycosylase that hydrolyses N-glycosyl compounds. The systematic name of this enzyme class is 1-methyladenosine ribohydrolase. This enzyme is also called 1-methyladenosine hydrolase.
