= Asterias versicolor =

Scientific classification
- Kingdom: Animalia
- Phylum: Echinodermata
- Class: Asteroidea
- Order: Forcipulatida
- Family: Asteriidae
- Genus: Asterias
- Species: A. versicolor

Binomial name
- Asterias versicolor Sladen, 1889

Synonyms
- Asterias amurensis f. versicolor (Sladen, 1889) Hayashi, 1940; Asterias amurensis ssp. versicolor (Sladen, 1889) Hayashi, 1940, implied

Species of starfish

Asterias versicolor is a species of starfish native to the southern coasts of Japan southwards to the South China Sea.

== Taxonomy ==
The species was first described by Percy Sladen in 1889. Sladen does not specify the etymology of the specific epithet, but states the mottled yellow and dark brown colouration is striking, and likely derived the name from this observation.

In 1930 Walter Kenrick Fisher stated that Asterias versicolor was closely related to A. amurensis, but that A. rollestoni might well intergrade with this species to the north of its range. In the same publication Fisher reduced A. rollestoni to a forma of A. amurensis.

In 1936 Ryori Hayashi published an account of the species and stated his doubts regarding its distinctiveness compared with A. amurensis, and in the 1940 article Contributions to the Classification of the Sea-stars of Japan Hayashi went through with his suggestion and reduced A. versicolor to a form of A. amurensis, as A. amurensis f. versicolor, considering it to be most similar to A. rollestoni -he ascribed to Fisher's classification of this taxon as A. amurensis f. rollestoni. This classification is still used in Japan (as a subspecies, A. amurensis ssp. versicolor). Alexander Michailovitsch Djakonov in 1950 cites Hayashi's 1936 work in his account of the species, instead of the main 1940 work cited elsewhere in his references, and he was unable to measure specimens personally, so it is somewhat unclear if Djakonov truly rejected Hayashi's classification.

== Description ==
This starfish has five arms. The disc is robust, convex and with a radius of up to 1.7-1.9cm across. The underside of the animal is flat, and the margin (edge) of especially the arms is sharply angular. It has an arm length to 6.2, 7.1 or 8.2cm, the width of the base of the arm being to 2.2cm; the ratio between the length of the arm and the radius of its disc is 4:1, to slightly more. Fisher states the general colour is yellowish mottled with brown, and implies the smaller immature specimens are mottled dark and light brown. Hayashi specifies the yellowish mottled with brown colouration is in dried museum specimens. Sladen specifies that when the specimens are preserved in alcohol the colouration is bleached yellowish-white on the underside and bleached yellowish-white mottled with dark chocolate brown on the topside.

There is a single spine arising from each patch of yellowish skin, with the dark brown patches being in the spineless areas in between. The dorsal (carinal) spines are small but robust, 1-1.2mm long, end in a truncated, sometimes channelled or otherwise crenellated point, and are arranged in a rough stripe down the top of each arm. These spines are affixed to the dorsal plates of the exoskeleton, and on the skin appear to occupy the centre of a low, broad, slightly convex bump. The dorsolateral spines are somewhat larger and widely spaced. The marginal spines are even wider spaced and somewhat larger, 1.7-2mm long, and the plates below the margin bear two shorter, robust spines each. The straight pedicellariae are relatively small, slender, 0.2–0.22mm long, and scattered over the dorsal surface. The crossed (forcipiform) pedicellariae are also slender, and clustered in wreaths or circles around the bases of the dorsal to the marginal spines.

It has planktonic larvae. Juveniles have the same spination as the adults on the top of the disc, but gradually grow more spines towards the margin as they increase in size. The size of the spines which are present appear relatively larger than those of adults. The margins of the arms are less sharply angular. When the arms reach 1.5cm in length the final adult spines appear, the double spines below the margin. When the starfish grows slightly larger the position of the spines shift into a fully adult formation.

=== Similar species ===
Sladen considered it a close ally of Asterias amurensis, being separated from this species by the spines on the plates below the margin and the character of the armature. Verrill and Hayashi find it is the most similar to A. rollestoni; according to Verrill differing from this species by having less spines and shorter and blunter pedicellaria; Hayashi pointing to the somewhat more robust skeleton, the single spine per dorsal plate, and the smaller and more slender pedicellaria. Fisher agrees with both views, noting it is "obviously related" to A. amurensis and possibly conspecific with A. rollestoni (a form of A. amurensis according to him), but "perfectly distinct from both".

== Distribution ==
The holotype was collected in the sea off Kobe in Japan by the 1873–1876 scientific expedition by the H.M.S. Challenger, these waters having depths of 8–50 fathoms according to Sladen in 1889, from which Djakonov derived his depth range of 14.5 to 91.5m for the species in 1950.

It is native to the southern coasts of Japan including Toyama Bay and the Seto Inland Sea, and has also been found southwards to north Taiwan, around Hong Kong and in the South China Sea. It was first recovered on seabeds with mud and sand substrates.
