= Papula =

Projections of the coelom of Asteroidea

Papulae (sing. papula; also occasionally papulla, papullae), also known as dermal branchiae or skin gills, are projections of the coelom of Asteroidea that serve in respiration and waste removal. Papulae are soft, covered externally with the epidermis, and lined internally with peritoneum. They extend through the mesodermal ossicles and are protected from microscopic larvae by pedicellariae. In a living specimen, the dermal gills can be extended or withdrawn.
