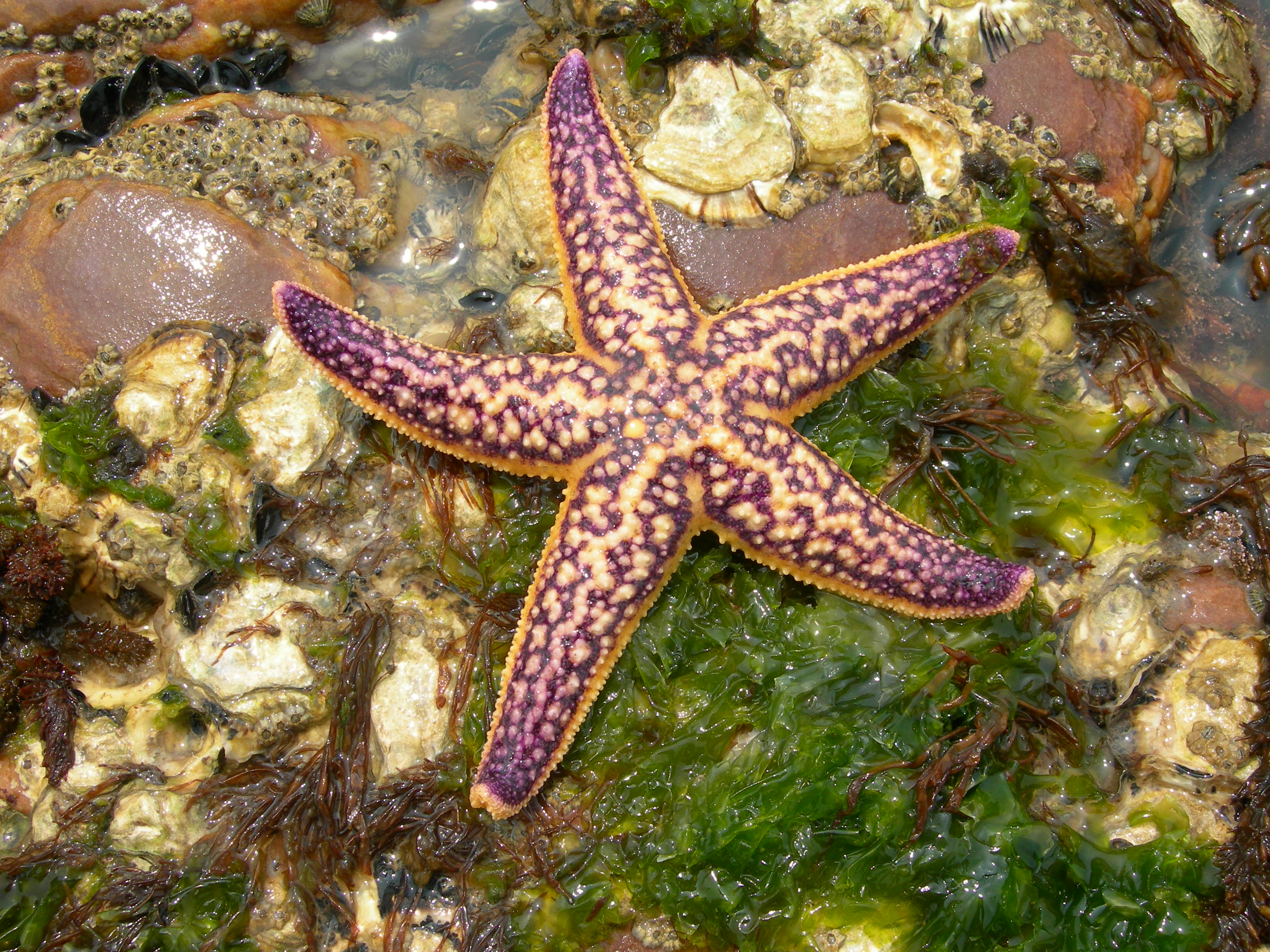

Scientific classification
- Kingdom: Animalia
- Phylum: Echinodermata
- Class: Asteroidea
- Order: Forcipulatida
- Family: Asteriidae
- Genus: Asterias
- Species: A. amurensis

Binomial name
- Asterias amurensis Lütken, 1871

Synonyms
- Allasterias migrata Sladen, 1879; Allasterias rathbuni var. nortonensis Verrill, 1909; Asteracanthion rubens var. migratum (Sladen, 1879) Döderlein; Asterias acervispinis (Djakonov, 1950); Asterias amurensis f. acervispinis Djakonov, 1950; Asterias amurensis f. flabellifera Djakonov, 1950; Asterias amurensis f. gracilispinis Djakonov, 1950; Asterias amurensis f. latissima Djakonov, 1950; Asterias flabellifera (Djakonov, 1950); Asterias gracilispinis (Djakonov, 1950); Asterias latissima (Djakonov, 1950); Asterias pectinata Brandt, 1835; Asterias rubens var. migratum (Sladen, 1879); Parasterias albertensis Verrill, 1914

= Asterias amurensis =

Species of starfish

Asterias amurensis, also known as the Northern Pacific seastar and Japanese common starfish, is a seastar found in shallow seas and estuaries, native to the coasts of northern China, Korea, far eastern Russia, Japan, Alaska, the Aleutian Islands and British Columbia in Canada. Two forms are recognised: the nominate and forma robusta from the Strait of Tartary. It mostly preys on large bivalve molluscs, and it is mostly preyed on by other species of starfish. Population booms in Japan can affect the harvest of mariculture operations and are costly to combat.

This species has been introduced to oceanic areas of southern Australia, and is an invasive species there causing damage to native species, especially in Tasmania.

== Common names ==
It is known in English vernacular as the northern Pacific seastar, flatbottom seastar, Japanese seastar, Japanese starfish, north Pacific seastar, purple-orange seastar and Japanese common starfish.

== Taxonomy ==
This species was first described in 1871 by Christian Frederik Lütken. Parasterias albertensis was described in 1914 from British Columbia by Addison Emery Verrill from a collection made late in the previous century and kept at the Smithsonian; this taxon was synonymised by Walter Kenrick Fisher in 1930.z

Walter Kenrick Fisher also subsumed Asterias rollestoni as a forma of A. amurensis in 1930, and further stated that A. versicolor might well intergrade with his A. amurensis f. rollestoni to the north of its range. In 1936, and subsequently in 1940, Ryori Hayashi followed Fisher's interpretation, in 1940 even subsuming Asterias versicolor as a form of A. amurensis, although Alexander Michailovitsch Djakonov in 1950 and subsequent authors have rejected this taxonomic interpretation.

Asterias pectinata was described from Kamchatka by Johann Friedrich Brandt in 1834 or 1835, and synonymised with Asterias amurensis by Fisher in 1930.

In the 1950 work Sea stars (Asteroids) of the USSR Seas (translation) Djakonov named five new forms of this species from the far eastern Soviet Union (recognizing six forms including the nominate), although these were later all synonymised, except for one: f. robusta.

=== Intraspecific variation ===
There are two forms (or subspecies) are accepted in the World Register of Marine Species by Christopher Mah as of 2008:

- Asterias amurensis f. amurensis Lütken, 1871 – likely described from the sea off Korea.
- Asterias amurensis f. robusta Djakonov, 1950 – described from far eastern Russia.

== Description ==
It can grow up to 50 cm in diameter, although this is exceptional and the arms usually grow to 16.1 cm, with the ratio between the length of the arm and the radius of its disc ranging from 3.6:1 to 5.9:1. It has five arms and a small central disk. It can be distinguished from similar species by the distinctive upturned tips of its arms. The underside is completely yellow. It shows a wide range of colors on its dorsal side: orange to yellow, sometimes red and purple. The arms are unevenly covered with small, jagged-edged spines, which line the groove in which the tube feet lie, and join up at the mouth in a fan-like shape.

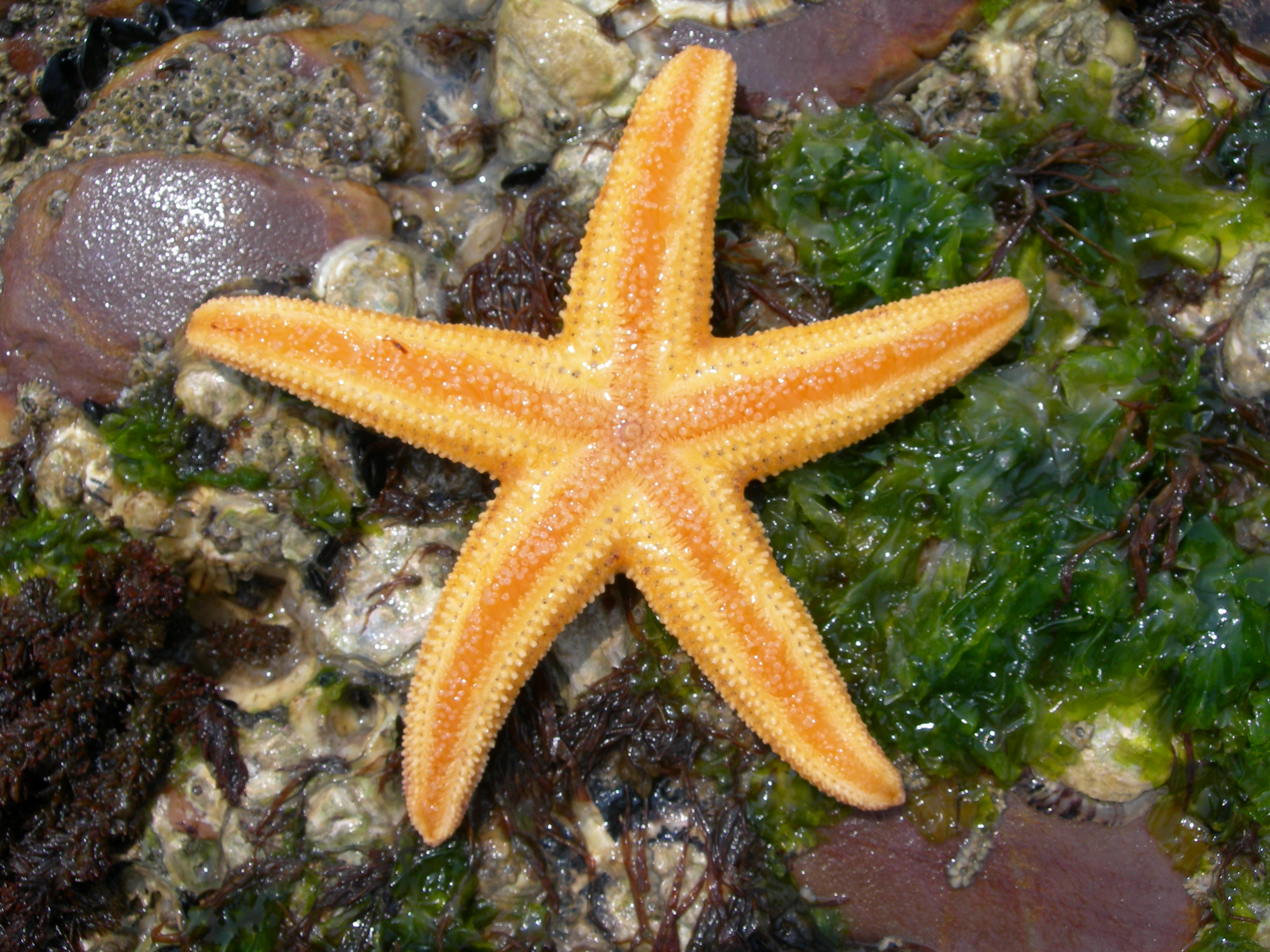
Asterias amurensis, ventral view

=== Similar species ===
According to Verrill, it most resembles the species Asterias forbesi and A. rubens from the north Atlantic. It is distinguished by its lack of interactional plates and the evenly reticulated arrangement of the dorsal plates.

== Distribution ==
=== Native ===
It is native to the coastal seawaters of northern China, North and South Korea, far eastern Russia, Japan, the Aleutian Islands, Alaska (from the Bering Sea to the Gulf of Alaska) and Canada (British Columbia). It is found throughout the Sea of Japan. It is common within its native range.

In Japan it is found on both coasts from Hokkaido to (northern) Kyushu and in the Seto Inland Sea: in Mitsu Bay off the coast of Yokohama, in Aomori Prefecture off the coast of Odanozawa and elsewhere, along the coast of Yamagata Prefecture, Tokyo Bay, between Tateishi and Ogashima in Sagami Bay off Nagai, off Hayama, in Karatsu Bay, Hakata Bay, Osaka Bay, Ise Bay, Sendai Bay and Ariake Bay.

In South Korea it is found on both the Pacific and the Sea of Japan coasts and has been found in Dokdo, Geoje Island, Jangmok and Tongyeong.

In Russia it is found in the Peter the Great Gulf in Primorsky Krai, in the Chukotka Autonomous Okrug in the eastern Chukchi Sea to the Arctic Ocean, Kamchatka, the Kuril Islands, both east and west shores of Strait of Tartary and on both coasts of Sakhalin.

In Canada it was collected in 1887 northeast of Vancouver Island, British Columbia, although records from Canada and Alaska may represent accidental human introductions.

=== Introduced ===
This species has been introduced to the west coast of Tasmania in southern Australia, parts of Europe and Maine. It was first collected in 1982 and first reported in 1985 in the Derwent River estuary in Tasmania, and first reported in Victoria, Australia in 1998. It has become an invasive species in Australia and is on the Invasive Species Specialist Group list of the world's 100 worst invasive species. It spread to Tasmania and Victoria as planktonic larvae in ballast water carried by commercial vessels sailing from where the species is native, such as Japan. In the European Union, due to the significant negative impacts of its introduction to the ecosystem, it is included in the list of invasive alien species of Union concern and hence cannot be imported, bred, transported, commercialized, or intentionally released into the environment in any of its member states.

== Ecology ==
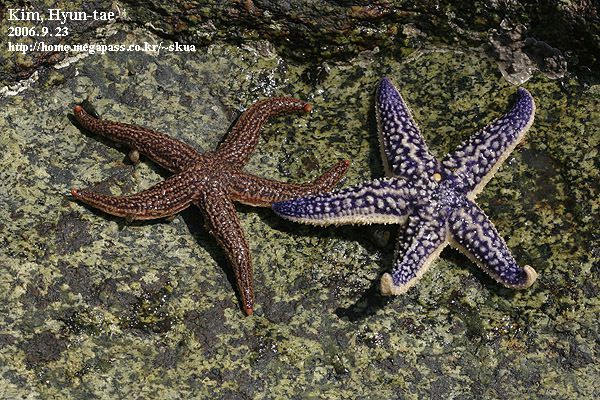
Asterias amurensis in Taean, South Chungcheong Province, South Korea

=== Habitat ===
They prefer a slightly cold environment of about 7–10 °C (45–50 °F). The optimum temperature is also said to be 9–13 °C (48–55 °F). It has a temperature tolerance of 0–25 °C (32–77 °F) according to one source, or 5–20 °C (41–68 °F) according to another. It is able to tolerate a large range of salinities, from 18.7–41.0 ppt., and can survive in estuaries. It has been found at a maximum depth of 220m.

It prefers shallow, sheltered areas. Adults are found on a wide range of substrates, including kelp forests, mud, sand, pebbles, rock, flotsam, nets and artificial substrates. It is not found in areas of high wave action or on reefs.

=== Behaviour ===
These sea stars move towards light. The adults are mobile with a top speed of 20 cm/minute. Tagged sea stars in Tokyo Bay, Japan, logged maximum travel distances 2.5 km in 32 days (78m/day) in the west of the bay, and 8.1 km in 129 days (62.8m/day) at the east. The population goes through boom-and-bust cycles in Japan, where it can swarm on occasions; during swarms the adults can float on the sea surface due to air retained within the body cavity. The population is mixed, with different age groups found intermingled. The animals can survive at least four years in the wild in Japan, but it is estimated that most live to two to three years. If the sea star is ripped apart, each arm can grow into a new animal (fissiparity) if a part of the main disk is attached. This is not entirely uncommon.

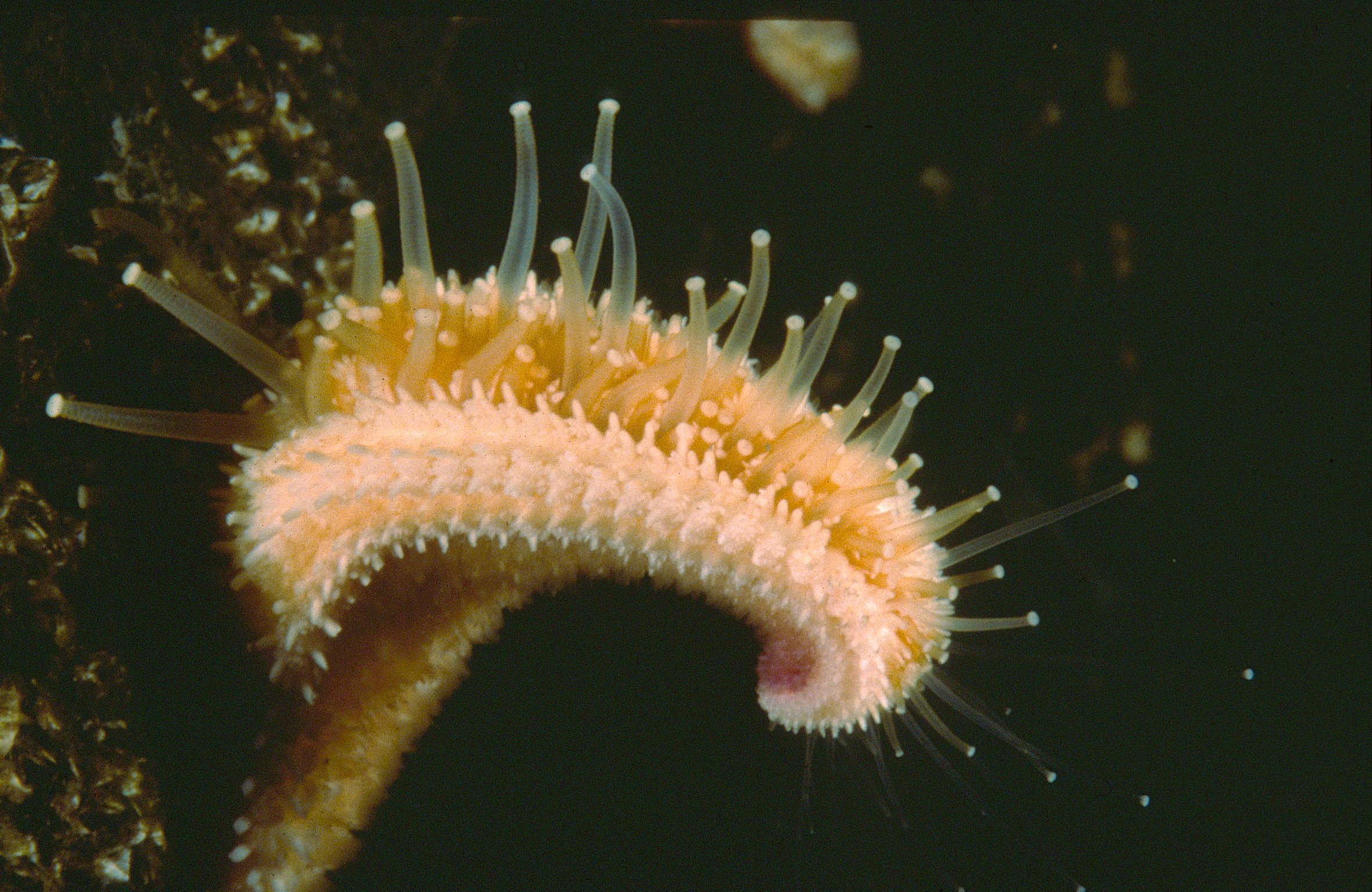
Asterias amurensis tube feet.

=== Development ===
Male and female sea stars release their gametes into the seawater (external fertilization), resulting in fertilized eggs. These go through gastrulation and become larvae. Once these begin to feed they are called bipinnaria, this stage then grows into the brachiolaria after growing five arms, three fused with the central disk. The development is temperature-dependant. These larvae float as pelagic plankton from 41 to 120 days before they find and settle on a surface and metamorphose into juvenile sea stars. This metamorphosis in larvae is stimulated by chemicals detected in the presence of adults and of tactile stimuli (feeling a surface). The first year these juveniles grow 6mm a month, thereafter they grow 1–2mm a month. Males and females can be sexually mature when they reach 3.6–5.5 cm in length, but by far most males and females reproduce when around 10 cm in diameter, when they are 1 year old. The species reproduces seasonally and spawns from January to April in Japan, from June to October in Russia, and between July and October in Australia. Females are capable of carrying up to 20 million eggs. Gametogenesis in females takes 9 months. Females spawn (release eggs) successively during the breeding season. In Japan it may spawn in two main events in the year, elsewhere it is once.

=== Species interactions ===
==== Prey ====
It is a generalist predator, but primarily preys on large bivalve mollusc species. It pulls their wings apart with all five arms and then everts its stomach into the shell. It can dig clams out of the seabed on occasion. It can be selective or opportunistic depending on availability of prey. It sometimes also preys on gastropods, crabs, barnacles, ascidians, sea squirts and algae. It has also been seen preying on itself during periods of low food abundance. It will also eat dead fish and fish waste.

In Tasmania it preys on the egg masses of the spotted handfish and the ascidians on which they spawn.

==== Predators ====
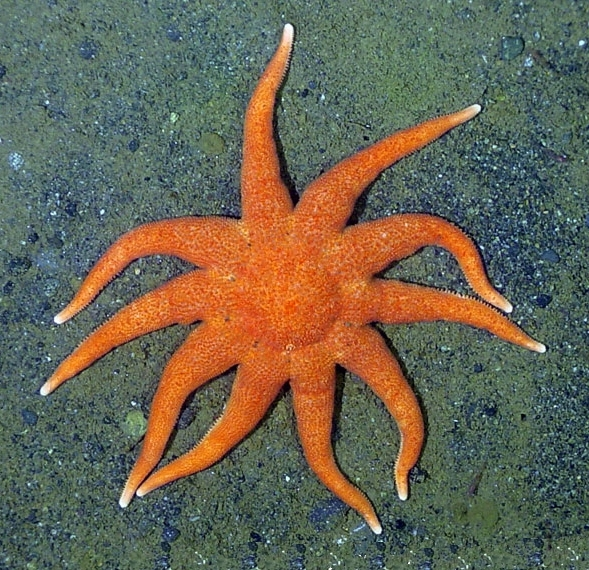
Solaster paxillatus is a predator of Asterias amurensis in Japan

In Japan, the sunstar Solaster paxillatus eats this species. It is preyed upon by the spiny sand seastar Luidia quinaria in Tokyo Bay. In aquaria in Alaska, king crabs (Paralithodes camtschaticus) were recorded feeding on this sea star. In laboratory experiments in Korea, Charonia sp. (trumpet snail) were found to prefer this species above other seastars, sea cucumbers and sea urchins.

==== Parasites ====
In Japan, the scuticociliates Orchitophrya stellarum and another Orchitophrya sp. are known to parasitize the gonads of this sea star, especially the males. O. stellarum infects testes and feeds on the gonads of various sea star species. It can cause castration and be lethal for Asterias amurensis in Japan. Other possible parasites found associated with these sea stars are the skeleton shrimps Caprella astericola, the copepod Scottomyzon gibberum, the polychaete scaleworm Arctonoe uittuta, species from the harpacticoid copepods genera Parathalestris, Thalestris, Paramphiacella and Eupelite, as well as several unidentified gammaridean amphipods and an unidentified apicomplexan living within it.

==== Other ====
In Japan it is abundant at 20m depth, but decreases to 50m, where it is replaced by another sea star species, Distolasterias nipon.

It competes with the starfish Uniophora granifera and Coscinasterias muricata, and Pacific walruses, Odobenus rosmarus ssp. divergens, for bivalve prey.

A possible commensal is the bacterium Colwellia asteriadis, a new species published in 2010, which has only been isolated from Asterias amurensis hosts in the sea off Korea. These showed no effects from hosting the bacteria.

== Impacts ==
=== Traditional medicine ===
It is considered useful in traditional medicine in China and is in the 2015 Pharmacopoeia of the People's Republic of China no.

=== Impacts on mariculture ===
It is a predator which can impact the abundance of juvenile bivalves. The asteroid stage can attach itself to salmon traps, oyster lines and scallop longlines. In Japan, where it is native, population outbreaks have cost the mariculture industry millions of dollars in control measures and losses from predation. It can have significant impact on Mizuhopecten yessoensis scallop plantations and populations of Fulvia tenuicostata and Patinopecten yessoensis in Japan, and some impact on mussels and oysters in Tasmania.

=== Invasive species ===
This sea star is an invasive species in Australia. It has colonized Australian waters in the Derwent Estuary, Port Phillip Bay and Henderson Lagoon in Tasmania. In the Derwent Estuary, the Northern Pacific sea star has been connected to the decline of the endemic endangered spotted handfish.

The most likely mechanism of introduction is the transport of free-swimming larvae in ballast water for ships. The ships suck in the ballast water containing sea star larvae, in a port such as one in Japan, and let it out in a port such as one in Tasmania, the larvae come out with the water, and metamorphose into juvenile sea stars.

==== Invasion prevention ====
To prevent sea star spreading between ports, scientists are paying close attention to the uptake of juveniles when collecting ballast water and farming shellfish. Young, microscopic sea stars will often settle on to mussel ropes and oyster trays instead of the ocean floor after their initial free-swimming stage. These ropes and trays are moved between bays and estuaries to aid shellfish farming. Farmers have taken methods into account such as freshwater dips and sterilizing ballast water before transportation. Filtration, chemical treatment, and heat treatment of ballast water can prevent the spread of invasive species.

==== Removal ====
Trials have been run to find effective removal processes including physical removal of A. amurensis, which was estimated by workshop participants to be the most effective, safe and politically attractive when compared with chemical or biological control processes. Several "sea star hunting days" have been organized in Tasmania in which several thousand sea stars have been removed. Mountfort et al. studied developing a probe to test ballast water and detect the presence of this specific maritime pest. Early detection remains the best solution to reducing harmful effects of invasive species.

== Conservation ==
The population has not been assessed by the IUCN.

== See also ==
- Northern Pacific seastar in Australia
- Asterias rubens
