= Francis Jeffrey Bell =

English zoologist (1855–1924)

- Born: Francis Jeffrey Bell; 26 January 1855; Calcutta, Company India
- Died: 1 April 1924 (aged 69); London, England
- Citizenship: United Kingdom
- Scientific career
- Fields: Zoology (echinoderms), Comparative anatomy

Francis Jeffrey Bell (26 January 1855 – 1 April 1924) was an English zoologist who specialised in echinoderms. He spent most of his life at the British Museum (Natural History), and was also a professor of comparative anatomy at King's College.

His author abbreviation is Bell.

== Life ==
Bell was born in Calcutta on 26 January 1855, the son of Francis Jeffrey Bell. He went to school at Christ's Hospital in London. In January 1874 he enrolled as a student at Magdalen College, Oxford, where he studied zoology and pursued comparative anatomy under George Rolleston. He graduated cum laude in 1878 with a BA in natural science. In that year he also received an appointment as assistant in the zoological department of the British Museum (Natural History), under Albert Günther. He retained that post until his retirement in 1919. In 1878, his translation of Gegenbaur's "Grundzüge der vergleichenden Anatomie" (1859) appeared as "Elements of Comparative Anatomy," which has long been used as a reference work. He obtained his MA in Oxford in 1881. In 1885 he himself published the "Manual of Comparative Anatomy and Physiology", which became a widely used work among medical students. From 1879 to 1897 he was a professor of comparative anatomy at King's College. In 1897 he became professor emeritus and fellow of that college.

In addition to being the author of a number of works on anatomy, Bell is best known for his many publications on echinoderms. In 1892 he published the standard work "Catalog of the British Echinoderms in the British Museum".

Francis Jeffrey Bell died on 1 April 1924 as a result of an accident.

== Publications ==
1879.	Observations on the Characters of the Echinoidea. I. On the Species of the Genus Brissus, and on the allied Forms Meoma and Metalia. Proceedings of the Zoological Society of London 1879: 249–255; BHL
-	Observations on the Characters of the Echinoidea. II. On the Species of the Genus Tripneustes, Agassiz. Proceedings of the Zoological Society of London 1879: 655–662, pl. 49; BHL
1880.	On Palaeolampas, a new Genus of the Echinoidea. Proceedings of the Zoological Society of London 1880: 43–49, pl. 4; BHL
-	Observations on the Characters of the Echinoidea. III. On some Genera and Species of the Temnopleuridae. Proceedings of the Zoological Society of London 1880: 422–440, pl. 41; BHL
1881.	Echinodermata. Account of the Zoological Collections made during the Survey of H.M.S. "Alert" in the Straits of Magellan and on the Coast of Patagonia. Proceedings of the Zoological Society of London 1881: 87–101, pl. 8–9; BHL
-	Observations on the Characters of the Echinoidea. IV. The Echinometridae; their Affinities and Systematic Position. Proceedings of the Zoological Society London 1881: 410–433; BHL
-	Description of a New Species of the Genus Mespilia. Proceedings of the Zoological Society of London 1881: 433–435; BHL
-	Contributions to the Systematic Arrangement of the Asteroidea. I. The Species of the Genus Asterias. Proceedings of the Zoological Journal of London 1881: 492–515; BHL
-	A note on the Characters of the Genus Crossaster, with the Description of a new Species. Annals and Magazine of Natural History ser. 5, 8: 140–142; BHL
1882.	Descriptions of new or rare Species of Asteroidea in the Collection of the British Museum. Proceedings of the Zoological Society of London 1882: 121–124; BHL
-	An attempt to apply a Method of Formulation to the Species of the Comatulidae; with the Description of a new Species. Proceedings of the Zoological Society of London 1882: 530–536, pl. 35; BHL
-	Studies in the Holothuroidea. I. On the Genus Psolus and the Forms allied thereto. Proceedings of the Zoological Society of London 1882: 641–650, pl. 48; BHL
-	Note on a Crinoid from the Straits of Magellan. Proceedings of the Zoological Society of London 1882: 650–652; BHL
1883.	Studies in the Holothuroidea. II. Descriptions of New Species. Proceedings of the Zoological Society of London 1883: 58–62; BHL
-	Descriptions of two new Species of Asteroidea in the Collection of the British Museum. Annals and Magazine of Natural History ser. 5, 12: 333–335; BHL
1884.	On the Generic Position and Relations of Echinanthus tumidus Woods. Proceedings of the Zoological Society of London 1884: 40–44, pl. 2–3; BHL
-	Contributions to the Systematic Arrangement of the Asteroidea. II. The Species of Oreaster. Proceedings of the Zoological Society of London 1884: 57–87; BHL
-	Echinodermata. Report on the zoological collections made in the Indo-Pacific Ocean during the voyage of H.M.S. "Alert", 1881–2: 117–177, pl. 8–17; BHL en 509–512, pl. 45; BHL
-	Studies in the Holothuroidea. III. On Amphicyclus, a new genus of Dendrochirotous Holothurians, and its bearing on the classification of the family. Proceedings of the Zoological Society of London 1884: 253–258; BHL
-	Studies in the Holothuroidea. IV. On the Structural Characters of the Cotton-spinner (Holothuria nigra), and especially on its Cuvierian Organs. Proceedings of the Zoological Society of London 1884: 372–376; BHL
-	Studies in the Holothuroidea. V. Further Notes on the Cotton-spinner. Proceedings of the Zoological Society of London 1884: 563–565; BHL
-	Notes on a collection of Echinodermata from Australia. Proceedings of the Linnean Society of New South Wales 9: 496–507; BHL
1886.	Note on Bipalium kewense and the generic characters of Land-Planarians. Proceedings of the Zoological Society of London 1886: 166–168; BHL
-	On the holothurians of the Mergui Archipelago collected for the Trustees of the Indian Museum by Dr. John Anderson, Superintendent of the Museum. Journal of the Linnean Society of London, Zoology 21: 25–28; BHL
1887.	On the Term Mulleria as applied to a Genus of Holothurians. Annals and Magazine of Natural History ser. 5, 19: 392; BHL
-	Description of a new species of Evechinus. Annals and Magazine of Natural History ser. 5, 20: 403–405, pl. 17; BHL
-	Report on a Collection of Echinodermata from the Andaman Islands. Proceedings of the Zoological Society of London 1887: 139–145; BHL
-	Studies in the Holothuroidea. VI. Descriptions of New Species. Proceedings of the Zoological Society of London 1887: 531–534; BHL
-	The echinoderm fauna of the island of Ceylon. The Scientific Transactions of the Royal Dublin Society ser. 2, 3: 643–658, pl. 39–40; BHL
1888.	Notice of a remarkable Ophiurid from Brazil. Annals and Magazine of Natural History ser. 6, 1: 368–370; BHL
-	Notes on Echinoderms collected at Port Philip by Mr. J. Bracebridge Wilson. Annals and Magazine of Natural History ser. 6, 2: 401–407; BHL
-	Descriptions of four new Species of Ophiurids. Proceedings of the Zoological Society of London 1888: 281–284, pl. 16; BHL
-	Report on a collection of echinoderms made at Tuticorin, Madras, by Mr. Edgar Thurston, C.M.Z.S., Superintendent, Government Central Museum, Madras. Proceedings of the Zoological Society of London 1888: 383–389; BHL
1889.	Note on the Relative Claims to Recognition of the Generic Names Arbacia, Gray, and Echinocidaris, Des Moulins. Annals and Magazine of Natural History ser. 6, 3: 290; BHL
-	Echinodermata. Report of a Deep-sea Trawling Cruise off the S.W. Coast of Ireland, under the direction of the Rev. W. Spotswood Green, MA., F.R.G.S. Annals and Magazine of Natural History ser. 6, 4: 432–445; BHL
1891.	Contributions to our Knowledge of the Antipatharian Corals. Transactions of the Zoological Society of London 13: 87–92; BHL
-	A test case for the law of priority. Annals And Magazine of Natural History ser. 6, 8: 108–109; BHL
-	On the Arrangement and Inter-relations of the Classes of the Echinodermata. Annals And Magazine of Natural History ser. 6, 8: 206–215; BHL
1892.	Description of a new Species of Antedon from Mauritius. Annals and Magazine of Natural History ser. 6, 9: 427–428, pl. 18; BHL
-	Catalogue of the British Echinoderms in the British Museum (Natural History): 1–202, pl. 1–16; BHL
-	A contribution to the classification of Ophiurids, with Descriptions of some new and little-known Forms. Proceedings of the Zoological Society of London 1892: 175–183, pl. 11–12; BHL
1893.	On Odontaster and its Allied or Synonymous Genera of Asteroid Echinoderms. Proceedings of the Zoological Society of London 1893: 259–262; BHL
-	Description of a remarkable new Sea-urchin of the Genus Cidaris from Mauritius. Transactions of the Zoological Society of London 13: 303–304, pl. 38; BHL
-	On a small Collection of Crinoids from the Sahul Bank, North Australia. Journal of the Linnean Society of London, Zoology 24: 339–341, pl. 23, 24; BHL
1894.	Note on Three Species of River-crabs of the Genus Telphusa, from Specimens collected in Eastern Africa by Dr. J.W. Gregory, Mr. H.H. Johnston, C.B., and Mr. F.J. Jackson. Proceedings of the Zoological Society of London 1894: 166; BHL
-	On the echinoderms collected during the voyage of H.M.S. "Penguin" and by H.M.S. "Egeria", when surveying Macclesfield Bank. Proceedings of the Zoological Society of London 1894: 392–413, pl. 23–27; BHL
1895.	Description of a new Species of Crab of the Genus Hyastenus. Proceedings of The Zoological Society of London 1895: 239–240; BHL
1899.	Report on the Echinoderms (other than Holothurians). in Willey, A. Zoological results based on material from New Britain, New Guinea, Loyalty Islands and elsewhere, collected during the years 1895, 1896, and 1897: 133–140; BHL
1902.	The Actinogonidiate Echinoderms of the Maldive and Laccadive Islands. in: Gardiner J.S. (ed.) The Fauna and Geography of the Maldive and Laccadive Archipelagoes 1(3): 223–233; BHL
-	Echinoderma. Report on the collections of Natural History made in the Antarctic regions during the voyage of the "Southern Cross": 214–220, pl. 26–28; BHL
1903.	Report on a Collection of Echinoderms from the Neighbourhood of Zanzibar. Annals and Magazine of Natural History ser. 7, 12: 244–248; BHL
1904.	Description of a new Genus of Spatangoids. Annals and Magazine of Natural History ser. 7, 13: 236–237; BHL
-	On the Echinodermata found off the coast of South Africa. I. Echinoidea. Marine Investigations in South Africa 3: 167–176; BHL
1905.	On the Echinodermata found off the coast of South Africa. II. Asteroidea. Marine Investigations in South Africa 3: 243–253; BHL
-	On the Echinodermata found off the coast of South Africa. III. Ophiuroidea. Marine Investigations in South Africa 3: 255–260; BHL
-	On the Echinodermata found off the coast of South Africa. IV. Crinoidea. Marine Investigations in South Africa 4: 139–142; BHL
1908.	Echinoderma I. National Antarctic Expedition 1901-04. Natural History 4: 1–16, pl. 1–5; BHL
1909.	Report on the Echinoderma (other than Holothurians) collected by Mr. J. Stanley Gardiner in the Western Parts of the Indian Ocean. Transactions of the Linnean Society of London, Zoology ser. 2, 13: 17–22; BHL
1917.	Echinoderma 1: Actinogonidiata. British Antarctic "Terra Nova" Expedition, 1910. Natural History Reports, Zoology 4(1): 1–10; BHL
