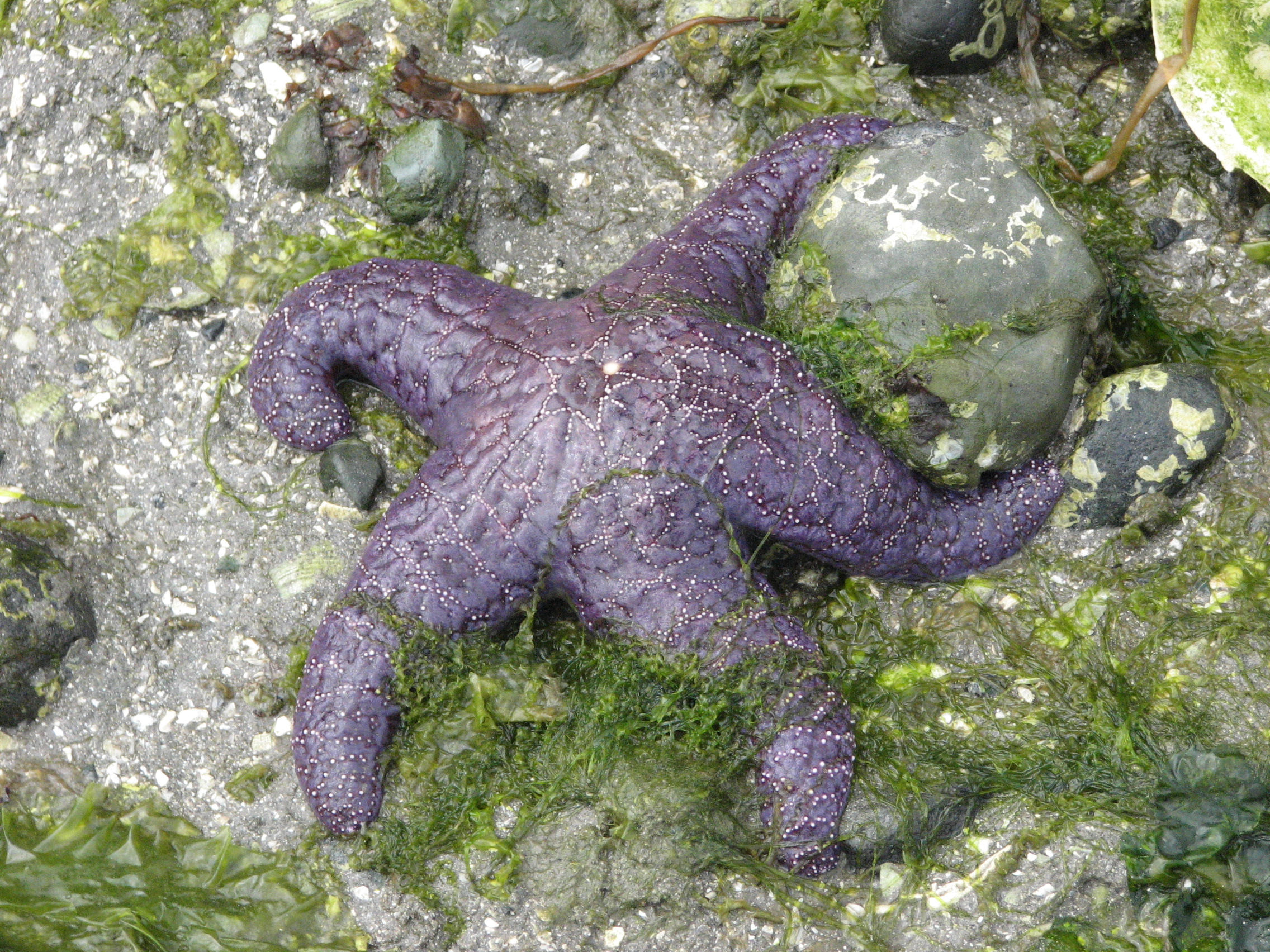
- Ganges Harbour, British Columbia
- Tofino, Vancouver Island, BC

Scientific classification
- Kingdom: Animalia
- Phylum: Echinodermata
- Class: Asteroidea
- Order: Forcipulatida
- Family: Asteriidae
- Genus: Pisaster
- Species: P. ochraceus

Binomial name
- Pisaster ochraceus (Brandt, 1835)

= Pisaster ochraceus =

Species of starfish

Pisaster ochraceus, generally known as the purple sea star, ochre sea star, or ochre starfish, is a common seastar found among the waters of the Pacific Ocean. Identified as a keystone species, P. ochraceus is considered an important indicator for the health of the intertidal zone.

== Description ==
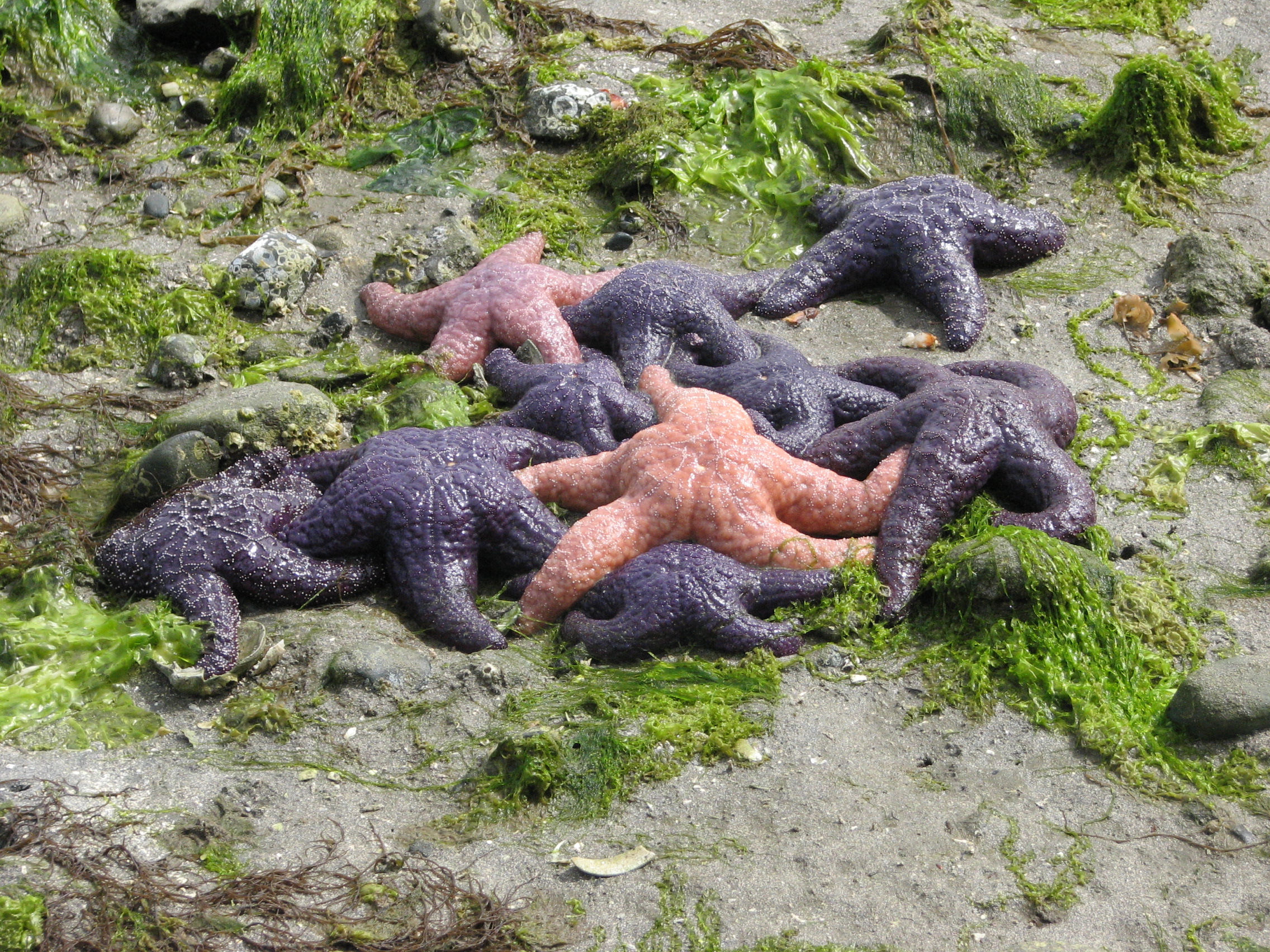
Cluster of stars, Salt Spring Island, British Columbia

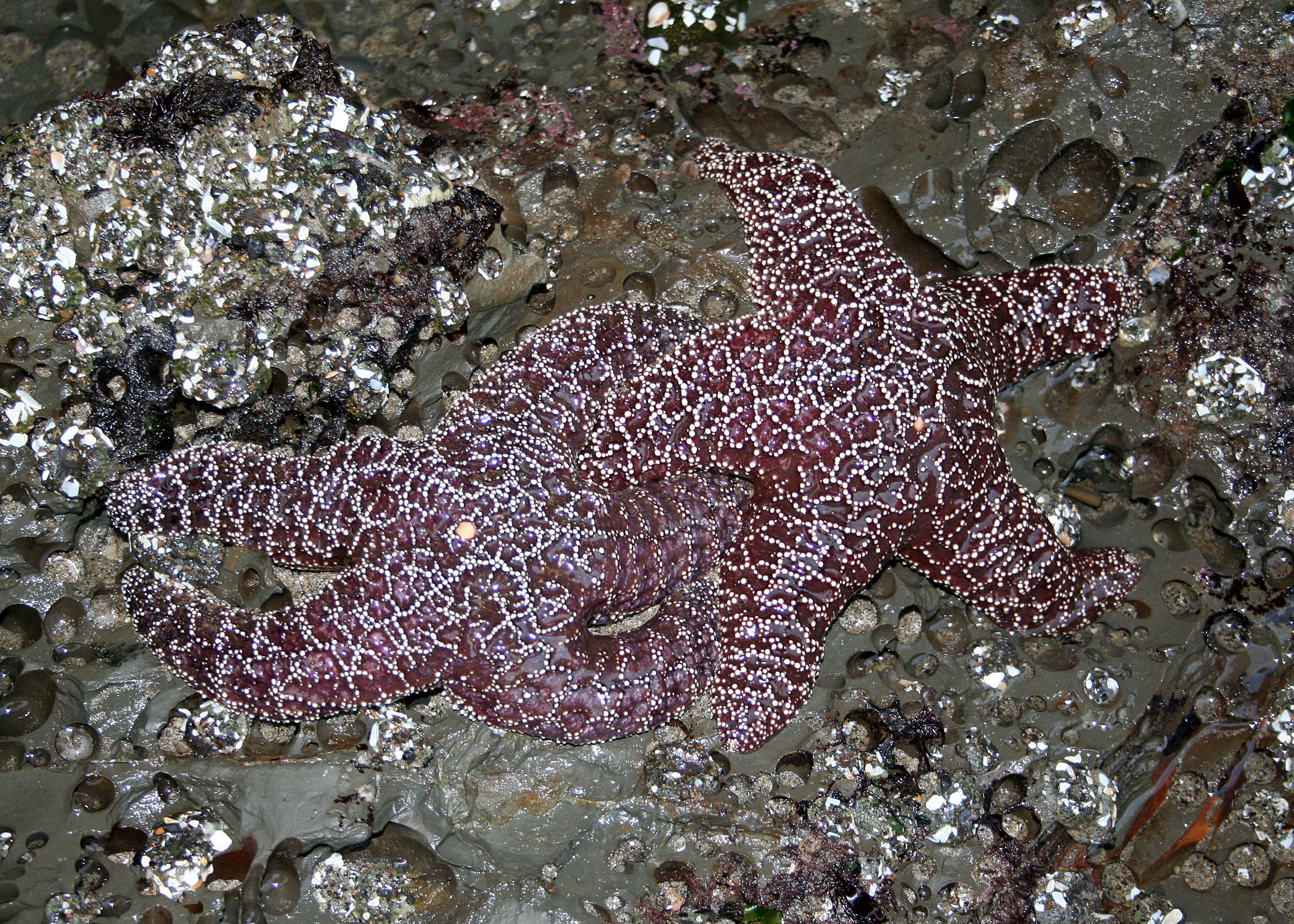
Two sea stars at Cape Kiwanda State Natural Area, Oregon.

This sea star has five stout rays that range in length from 10 to 25 centimeters (4 to 10 in). The rays are arranged around an ill-defined central disk that needs to be a bit attached to a severed arm to grow a new sea star off of it. While most individuals are purple, they can be orange, orange-ochre, yellow, reddish, or brown. The aboral surface contains many small spines (ossicles) that are arranged in a netlike or pentagonal pattern on the central disk. The ossicles are no higher than 2 mm. In Pisaster ochraceus the tube feet have suckers on their distal ends which allow them to attach to the rocky substrate and live in heavily wave-swept areas. P. ochraceus has a simple nervous system and does not have a brain. A nerve ring connects and relays impulses between the star's radial nerves.

Two species that can be mistaken for P. ochraceus are P. giganteus, which has blue rings around white or purple spines, and P. brevispinus, which is pink with small white spines. These two species have different aboral spines and coloration which allows one to distinguish between the species. Evasterias troschelii may be confused with P. ochraceus at times as well. It can be distinguished by its smaller disk size and longer, tapering rays which are often thickest a short distance out from their base rather than at the base as in P. ochraceus.

== Reproduction and life history ==
=== Reproduction ===
Members of Pisaster are dioecious but there is no sexual dimorphism and sexes can be separated only by the presence of eggs or sperm in the gonads. They reproduce by broadcast spawning, which in the Puget Sound population occurs around May to July. There is no parental investment beyond spawning. Fertilization occurs in the water column and Pisaster ochraceous develops through several larval stages.

The reproductive system consists of a pair of gonads branching into each ray off a circular genital strand which is along the oral inner surface of the central disc. The gonads look like a feathery collection of tubules. In females there are orange gonads and in males they are whitish. During maturation of the gametes, the gonads increase in size and can account for up to 40 percent of the sea star's weight. The gonopores are too small to be seen, and can only be found when the sea stars are spawning.

=== Lifespan ===
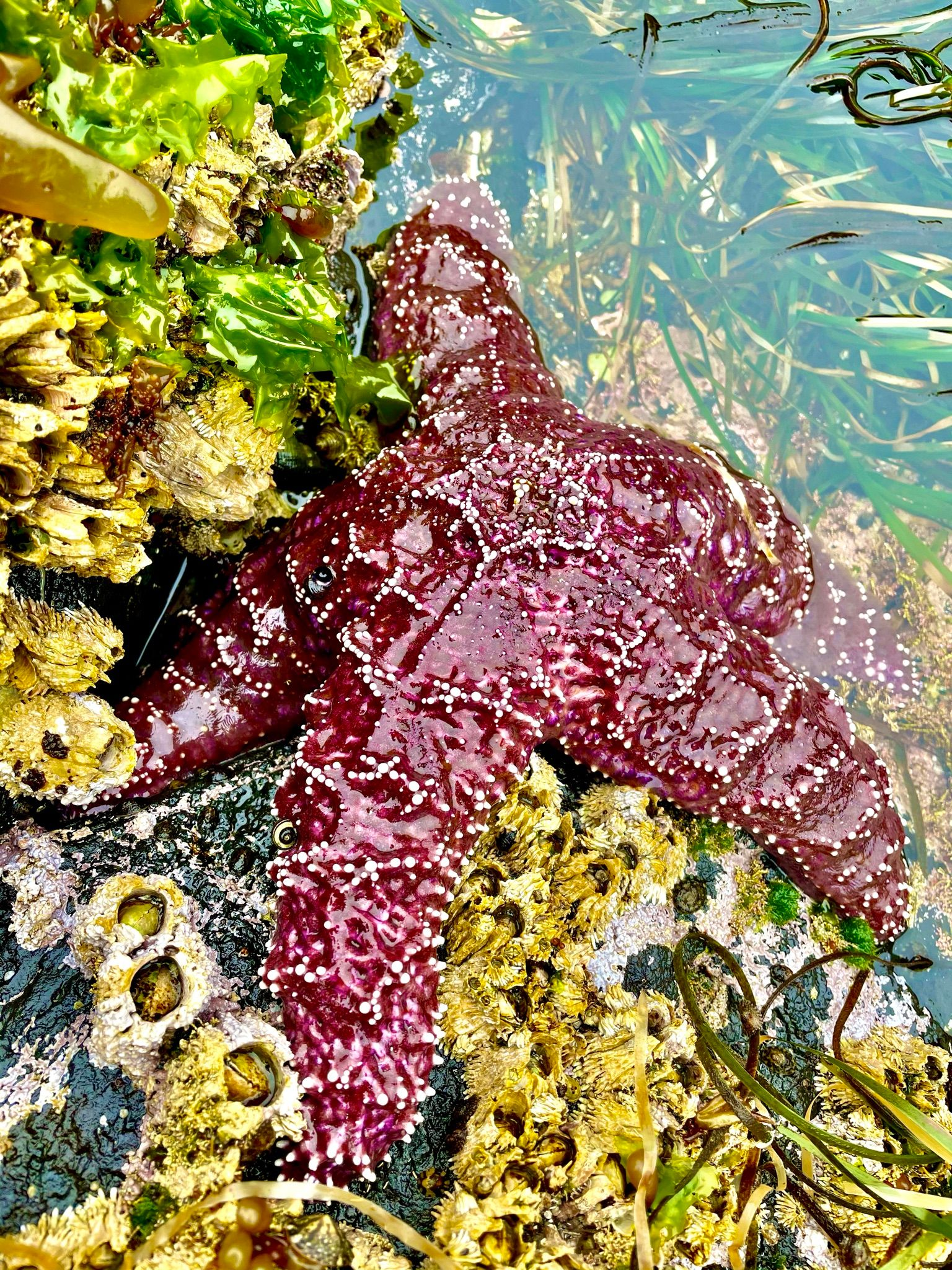
Saint Lazaria Island, Alaska

Many sea stars live to a minimal age of four years. P. ochraceus can live as long as twenty years.

This species of seastar is often considered a keystone species in many intertidal regions. P. ochraceus is a predator of the California mussel, Mytilus californianus and reduces its abundance. This allows for other macroinvertebrates to persist. In an experimental removal of P. ochraceus, it was shown that Mytilus californianus becomes almost completely dominant of the intertidal community. When P. ochraceus is present there is a diverse intertidal community.

== Feeding ==
At the larval stage, Pisaster ochraceus are filter feeders and their diet consists of plankton. As an adult, P. ochraceus feeds on mussels such as Mytilus californianus and Mytilus trossulus. They also feed on chitons, limpets, snails, barnacles, echinoids, and even decapod crustacea.

P. ochraceus uses its tube feet to handle its prey. If the prey is too large to be swallowed whole, then it can use its tube feet to open shells. It can evert its stomach through its mouth and engulf its prey, liquify it with digestive enzymes and ingest the processed food. Mussels hold their valves together very securely but P. ochraceus can insert part of its everted stomach, or some digestive juices, through the narrow gap that exists where the byssal threads emerge from the shell. The mussel needs to open its valves periodically to feed and breathe and the sea star can exert a powerful traction with its tube feet, pulling the two valves further open. Once the stomach is inside the mussel, digestion takes place. It is thought one sea star can consume eighty Californian mussels in a year.

== Ecology and distribution ==
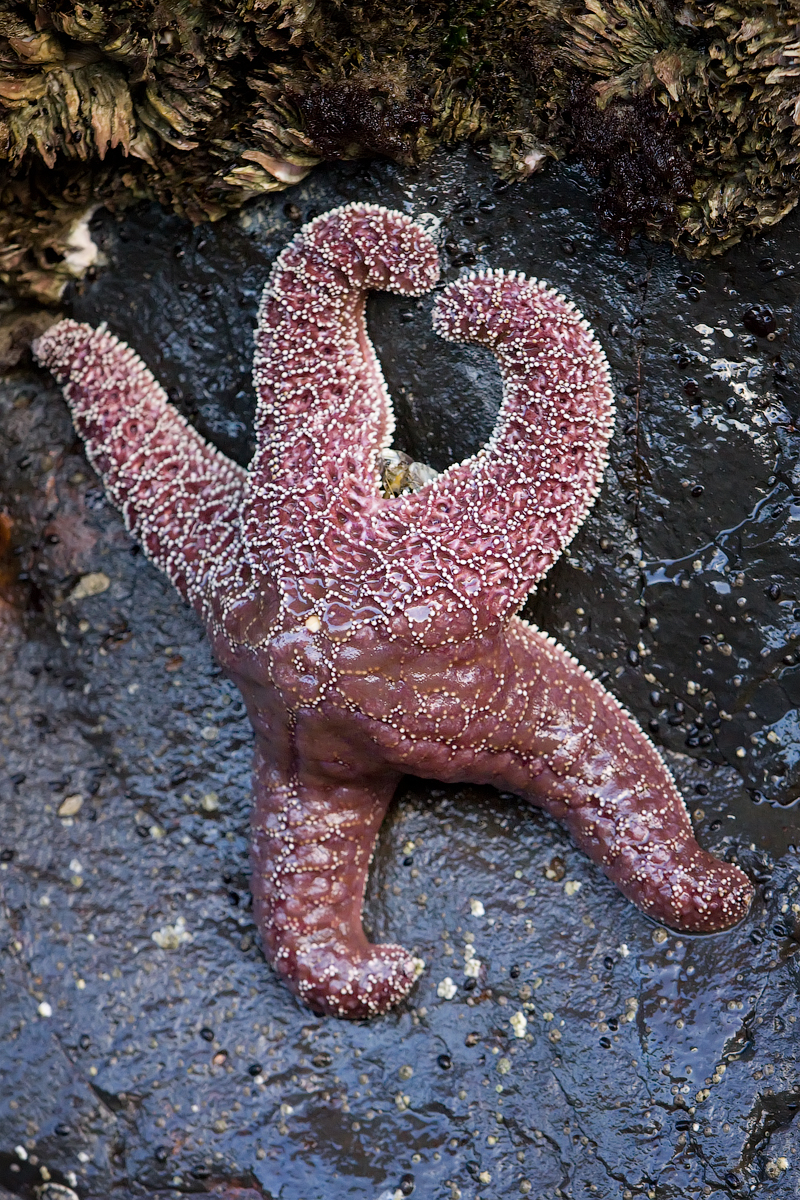
P. ochraceus Oregon coast, near Cannon Beach

=== Conservation ===
Pisaster ochraceus has been described as a keystone species. Experiments by zoologist Robert T. Paine in the 1960s demonstrated that a loss of only a few individual P. ochraceus seastars had a profound impact on mussel bed population, thereby reducing the health of the intertidal environment. With only a few natural predators (sea otters and seagulls) it is suggested that the principal threats to P. ochraceus are human collectors and casual tidepool visitors. Pisaster ochraceus has not been evaluated by the International Union for Conservation of Nature (IUCN).

An outbreak of sea star wasting disease starting in 2013 heavily reduced P. ochraceus populations. Their population is currently recovering. While epizootics are natural disturbances of population, climate change and human interference in starfish habitat exacerbate the impact.

=== Geographic range ===
Pisaster ochraceus can be found from Prince William Sound in Alaska to Point Sal in Santa Barbara County, California. The subspecies found within the warmer waters from Santa Barbara County to Baja California is P. o. segnis.

=== Habitat ===
This sea star can be found in great numbers on mussel beds and on wave-washed rocky shores. The juveniles are often found in crevices and under rocks. Its depth range is from above the low-tide zone to 90 metres (300 ft). P. ochraceous is very durable and can tolerate a loss of thirty percent of its body weight in body fluids.

=== Effects of ocean acidification ===
A study found that P. ochraceus will not be affected by ocean acidification in the same way as most calcareous marine animals. This normally causes decreased growth due to the increased acidity dissolving calcium carbonate. Researchers found that when P. ochraceus was exposed to 21 °C (70 °F) and 770 ppm CO_{2} (beyond rises expected in the next century) they survived. It is thought that this is because the animal's calcium is nodular and so it is able to compensate for the lack of carbonate by growing more fleshy tissue instead.
