= Avoidance response =

Response that prevents an aversive stimulus

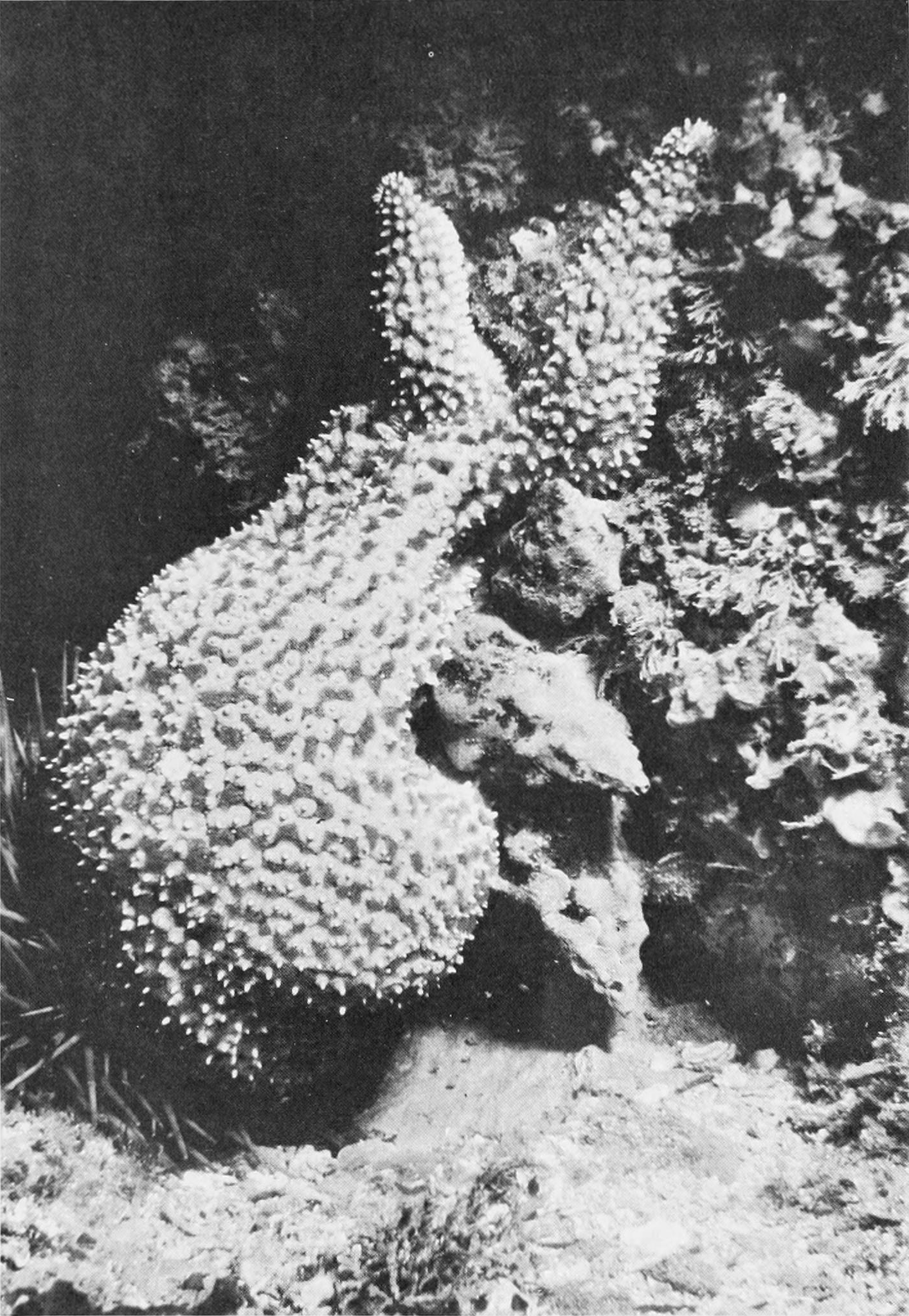
The Kellet's whelk does not display an avoidance response in the presence of the sea star Pisaster giganteus. The sea star is eating the bivalve Chama pellucida while three Kelletia kelletii are attempting to get to the prey.

An avoidance response is a response that prevents an aversive stimulus from occurring. It is a kind of negative reinforcement. An avoidance response is a behavior based on the concept that animals will avoid performing behaviors that result in an aversive outcome. This can involve learning through operant conditioning when it is used as a training technique. It is a reaction to undesirable sensations or feedback that leads to avoiding the behavior that is followed by this unpleasant or fear-inducing stimulus.

Whether the aversive stimulus is brought on intentionally by another or is naturally occurring, it is adaptive to learn to avoid situations that have previously yielded negative outcomes. A simple example of this is conditioned food aversion, or the aversion developed to food that has previously resulted in sickness. Food aversions can also be conditioned using classical conditioning, so that an animal learns to avoid a stimulus previously neutral that has been associated with a negative outcome. This is displayed nearly universally in animals since it is a defense against potential poisoning. A wide variety of species, even slugs, have developed the ability to learn food aversions.

== Experiments ==
An experiment conducted by Solomon and Wynne in 1953 shows the properties of negative reinforcement. The subjects, dogs, were put in a shuttle box (a chamber containing two rectangular compartments divided by a barrier a few inches high). The dogs had the ability to move freely between compartments by going over the barrier. Both compartments had a metal floor designed to administer an unpleasant electric shock. Each compartment also had a light above each, which would turn on and off. Every few minutes, the light in the room the dog was occupying was turned off, while the other remained on. If after 10 seconds in the dark, the dog did not move to the lit compartment, a shock was delivered to the floor of the room the dog was in. The shock continued until the dog moved into the other compartment. In doing this, the dog was escaping the shock by jumping the barrier into the next room. The dog could avoid the shock completely though by jumping the barrier before the 10 seconds of darkness led to a shock. Each trial worked this way with avoiding the shock as the response. In the first few trials, the dog did not move until the shocks began and then it jumped over the barrier. However, after several trials, the dog began to make avoidance responses and would jump over the barrier when the light turned off, and would not receive the shock. Many dogs never received the shock after the first trial. These results led to questioning in the term avoidance paradox (the question of how the nonoccurrence of an aversive event can be a reinforcer for an avoidance response?)

Because the avoidance response is adaptive, humans have learned to use it in training animals such as dogs and horses. B.F. Skinner (1938) believed that animals learn primarily through rewards and punishments, the basis of operant conditioning. The avoidance response comes into play here when punishment is administered. An animal will presumably learn to avoid the behavior that preceded this punishment. A naturally occurring example for humans would be that after a child has been burned by a red stove, he or she learns not to touch the stove when it is red. The child avoids that behavior in the future. For a non-human animal, an example would be that of invisible fences which prompt a dog to learn not to cross a certain (invisible) boundary because its collar shocks it when it does.

== Disorders ==
Although the avoidance response is often advantageous and has developed because it is adaptive, it can sometimes be harmful or become obsessive. Such is the case with obsessive compulsive disorder, a disorder involving mental obsessions followed by actions performed often repetitively, to relieve the anxiety of the obsessions, panic disorder, and other psychiatric disorders. In panic disorder, a person learns to avoid certain situations such as being in crowded places because when they enter these situations, a panic attack (aversive stimulus) ensues. People with obsessive compulsive disorder may learn to avoid using public restrooms because it produces anxiety in them (aversive stimulus).

== Neuropharmacology ==
The posterior and intermediate lobes of the pituitary are necessary for maintenance of the avoidance response once learned. When these areas of the brain are lesioned or removed, animals display difficulty in maintaining a conditioned avoidance response. The avoidance response can be extinguished using a procedure called "flooding" or response prevention. This is a method in which the subject is forced to remain in the fearsome or aversive situation and not allowed the opportunity to avoid it. This is sometimes used in treatment of obsessive compulsive disorder. Systematic desensitization can also be used to extinguish avoidance response behaviors. See for example studies involving avoidance response.

== See also ==
- Conditioned avoidance response test
- Escape response
- Fight-or-flight response
- Flight zone
- Startle reaction
