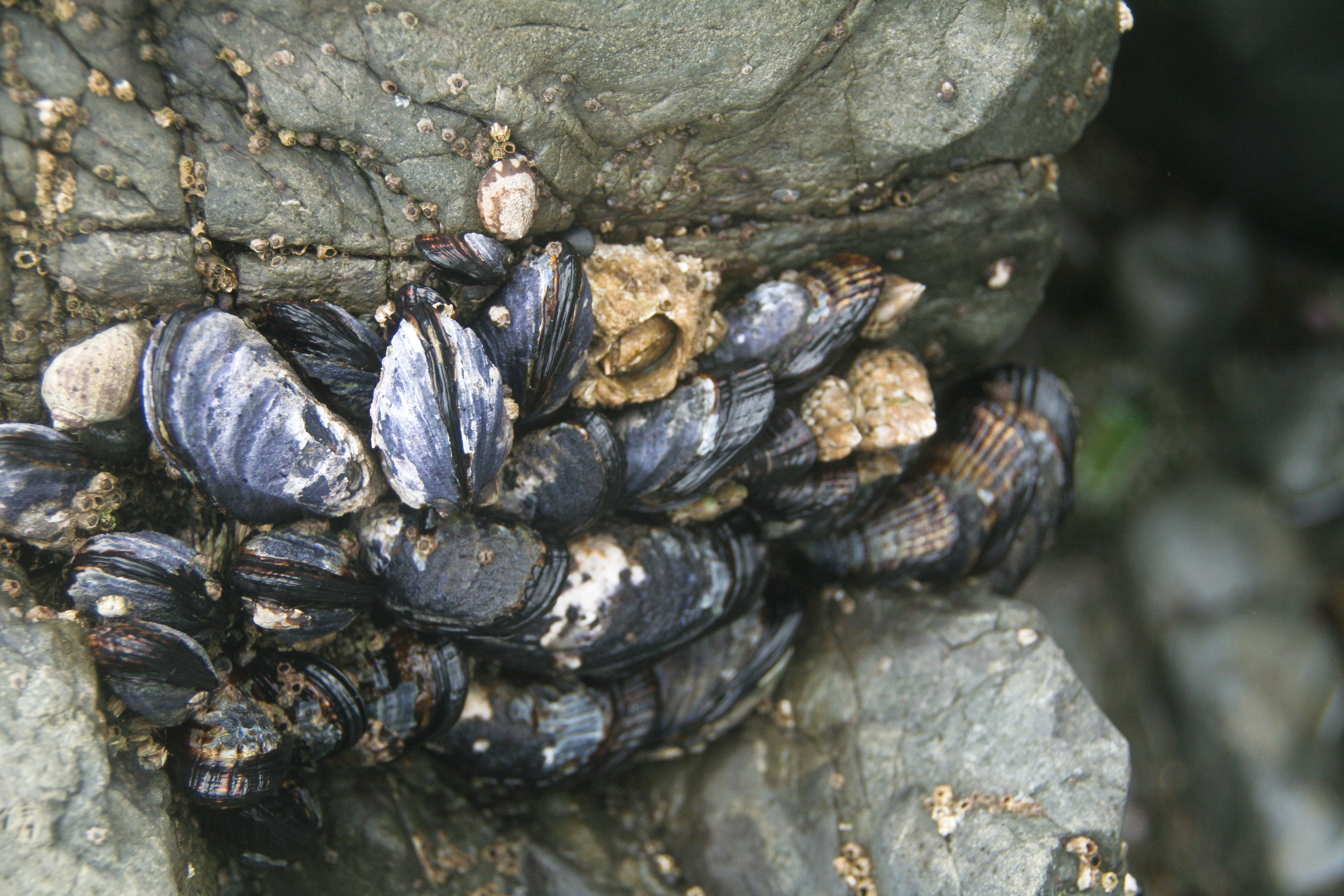

Scientific classification
- Kingdom: Animalia
- Phylum: Mollusca
- Class: Bivalvia
- Order: Mytilida
- Family: Mytilidae
- Genus: Mytilus
- Species: M. californianus

Binomial name
- Mytilus californianus Conrad, 1837

= California mussel =

Species of bivalve

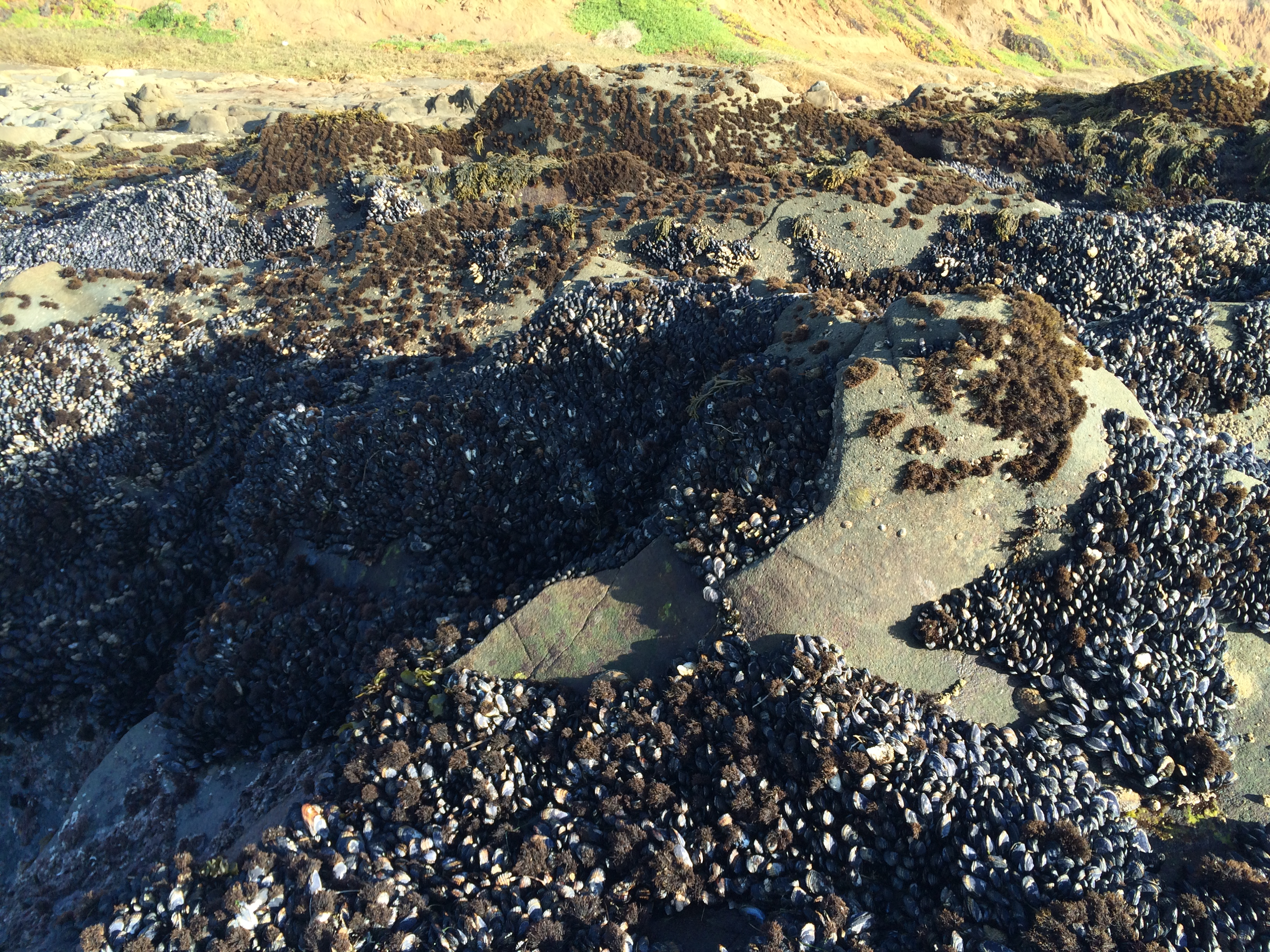
Large California mussel beds, north Moonstone beach near Cambria, California. Brown, furry-looking seaweed is Gloiopeltis furcata, both in the mid to upper intertidal zones.

The California mussel (Mytilus californianus) is a large edible mussel, a marine bivalve mollusk in the family Mytilidae.

This species is native to the west coast of North America, occurring from northern Mexico to the Aleutian Islands of Alaska. California mussels are found clustered together, often in very large aggregations, on rocks in the upper intertidal zone on the open coast, where they are exposed to the strong action of the surf.

== Shell description ==
The shell of this species is thick and is often 129 to 130 millimetres (5 to 5 in) in length, sometimes larger still. The shell is blue on the outside with a heavy brown periostracum which is usually worn off except near the growing edge of the shell. The beaks of the shell are often eroded. The shell has coarse radial ribbing and irregular growth lines on the outer surface. The inner surface of the shell is blue and faintly pearly.

Like other mytilids, the animal is attached to the substrate with a very strong and elastic byssus.

The shell is primarily made of carbonates. In the 1950s that was mostly aragonite with some calcite, but by 2017/2018 the proportions had reversed. This was surprising given that previously some increase in aragonite was observed in warmer waters, and the ocean temperature has risen since then, making researchers expect an increase in aragonite. However it was the opposite - showing that the deciding factor in M. californianus shell carbonate composition is ocean acidification - because calcite withstands acidity better.

== Ecology ==
The California mussel prefers the high salinity, low sediment conditions found on open rocky coasts. However, they do not colonize bare rock easily, instead preferring the shelter of pre-existing mussels and their biological filaments. Mussels attach themselves to the hard surfaces using their thread-like byssus.

Given the right circumstances, California mussels can grow up to 200 mm (8 inches) in length and may live for more than 20 years. However, mortality in intertidal open coastal environments is often high, resulting from battering from driftwood and other debris, wave pounding, predation, desiccation, and disease. Predators of California mussels include the Pisaster starfish. They feed on plankton.

== Human use ==
California mussels were an important food source for the Native Americans who lived on the Pacific Coast prior to European contact. On California's Northern Channel Islands, archaeological evidence shows that they were harvested continuously for almost 12,000 years. Erlandson et al. (2008) documented a decline in the average size of harvested California mussels on San Miguel Island during the past 10,000 years, a pattern they attributed to growing human populations and increased predation pressure from human fishing. Hogan (2008) notes more specific archaeological recovery from the Chumash in the period 800 to 1300 AD.

California mussels continue to be harvested as sources of both food and bait up and down the Pacific Coast of North America. The flesh of the California mussel tends to be orange in color. They can be baked, boiled, or fried like other mussels, clams, and oysters.

While these mussels are usually edible, care needs to be taken, because during times of red tide in any given locality, California mussels may contain harmful levels of the toxins which can cause paralytic shellfish poisoning.

== In science ==
The keystone species concept was coined, in 1969, by the zoologist Robert T. Paine, professor emeritus of the University of Washington, to explain the relationship between Pisaster ochraceus, a species of starfish, and Mytilus californianus.

== See also ==
- Blue mussel, Mytilus edulis
