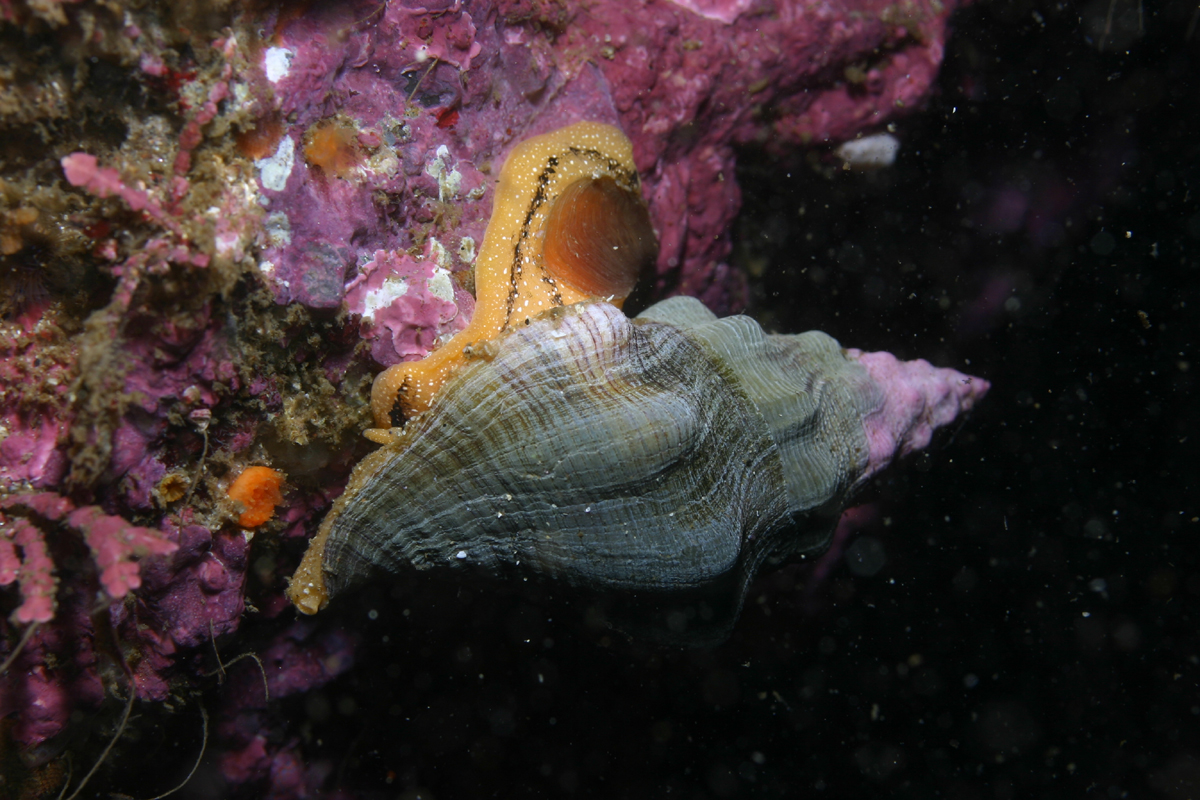
- a live Kelletia kelletii

Scientific classification
- Kingdom: Animalia
- Phylum: Mollusca
- Class: Gastropoda
- Subclass: Caenogastropoda
- Order: Neogastropoda
- Family: Austrosiphonidae
- Genus: Kelletia
- Species: K. kelletii

Binomial name
- Kelletia kelletii (Forbes, 1850)

Synonyms
- Fusus kelletii Forbes, 1850 (original combination); Siphonalia kelletii (Forbes, 1850)

= Kelletia kelletii =

Kelletia kelletii Temporal range: Pleistocene-Recent

Species of gastropod

Kelletia kelletii, common name Kellet's whelk, is a species of large sea snail, a whelk, a marine gastropod mollusc in the whelk family Austrosiphonidae.

Kelletia kelletii is a large scavenger and predatory sea snail commonly found in subtidal kelp forests, rocky reefs, and cobble-sand interfaces at depths ranging from 2 to 70 m from Isla Asunción, Baja California, Mexico to Monterey, California, USA. It aggregates seasonally for mating and is slow-growing. It is also a recently targeted fishery species and a subject of a rapidly expanding fishery.

== Distribution ==
Kelletia kelletii is found from Isla Asunción, Baja California, Mexico, to Monterey, CA, USA. The type locality is the "Californian coast". Studies suggest that the Kellet's whelk range expanded to Monterey Bay in the 1970s or early 1980s, possibly due to an El Niño event, and is dependent on recruits from southern California.

== Description ==
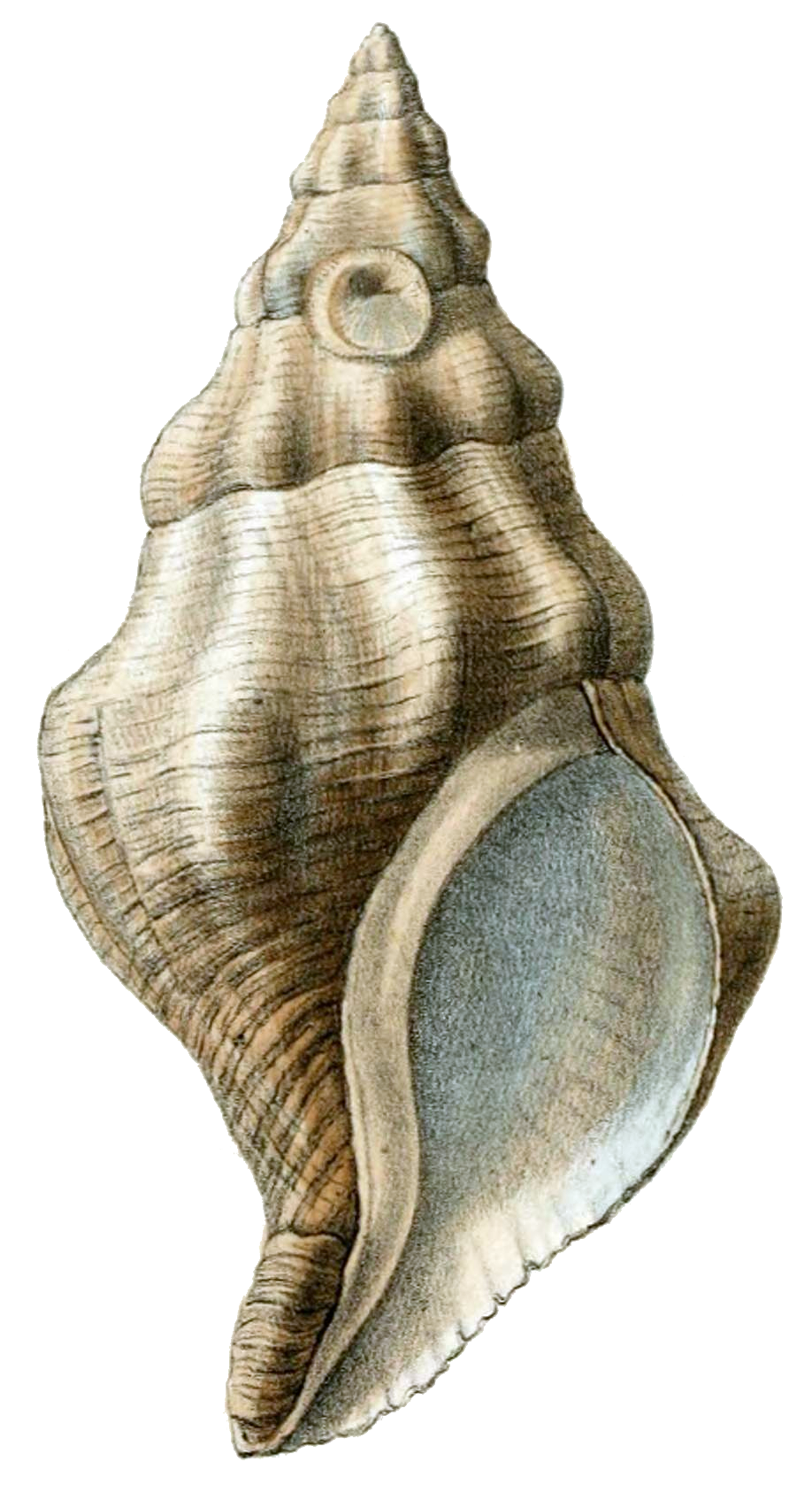
An apertural view of a shell of Kelletia kelletii from its original 1850 description, drawn by William Hellier Baily

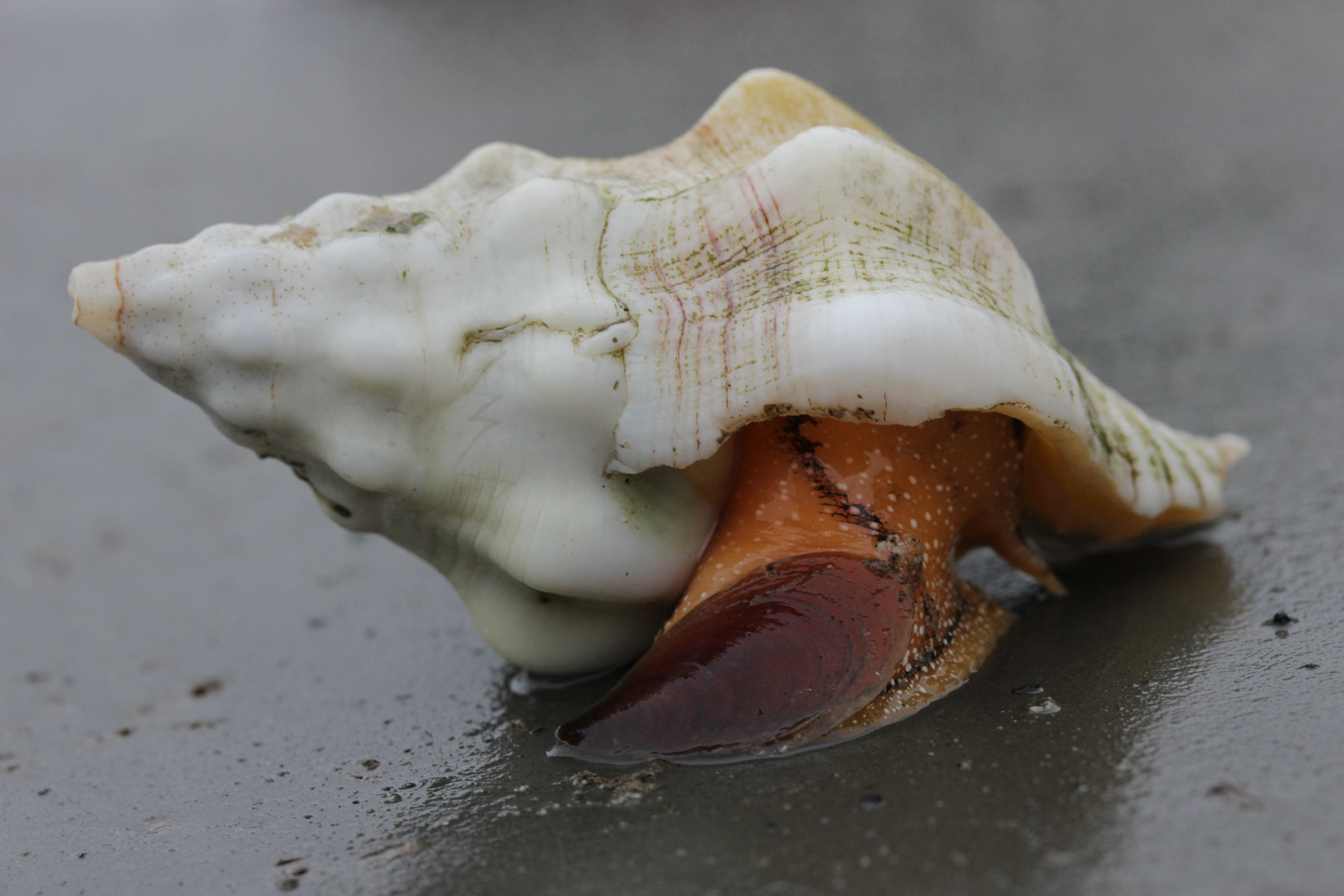
A live Kelletia kelletii

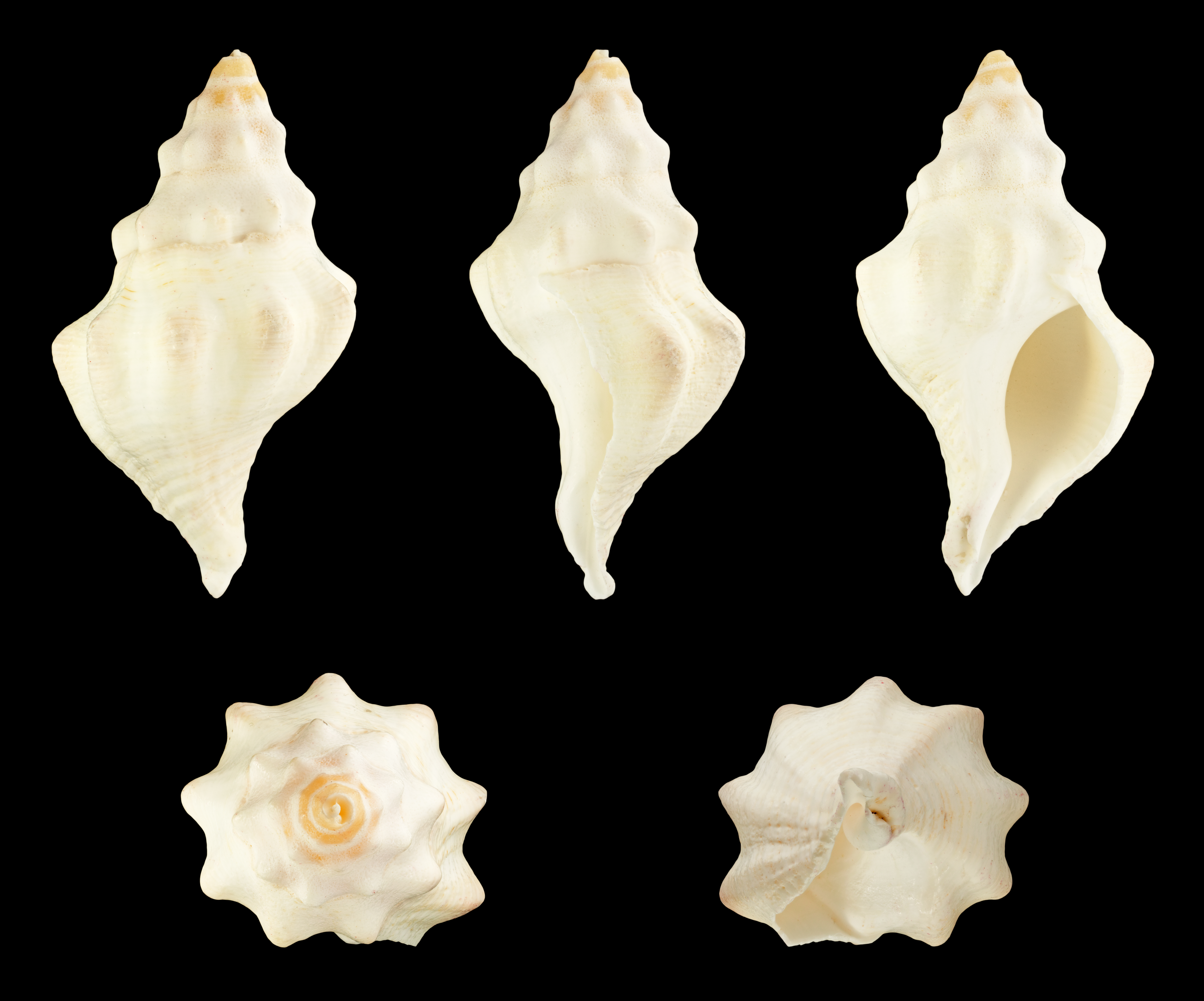
A shell of Kelletia kelletii

Kelletia kelletii was discovered and described (under the name Fusus kelletii) by Manx naturalist Edward Forbes in 1850. The specific name kelletii is in honor of captain Henry Kellett, who led the scientific expedition during which these snails were collected.

Kellet's whelks are the largest buccinid gastropods found in southern California. The robust, spindle shaped, spiraled shell can reach 6.9 inches (17.5 centimeters) in length. Shells are white to tan and are often covered with encrusting organisms such as bryozoans, sponges and algae.

Kellet's whelks display sexual dimorphism with females being the larger individual in a mating pair. Females are generally sexually mature between 2.6 and 2.8 inches (6.5 and 7.0 centimeters), with males maturing at slightly smaller sizes.

== Ecology ==
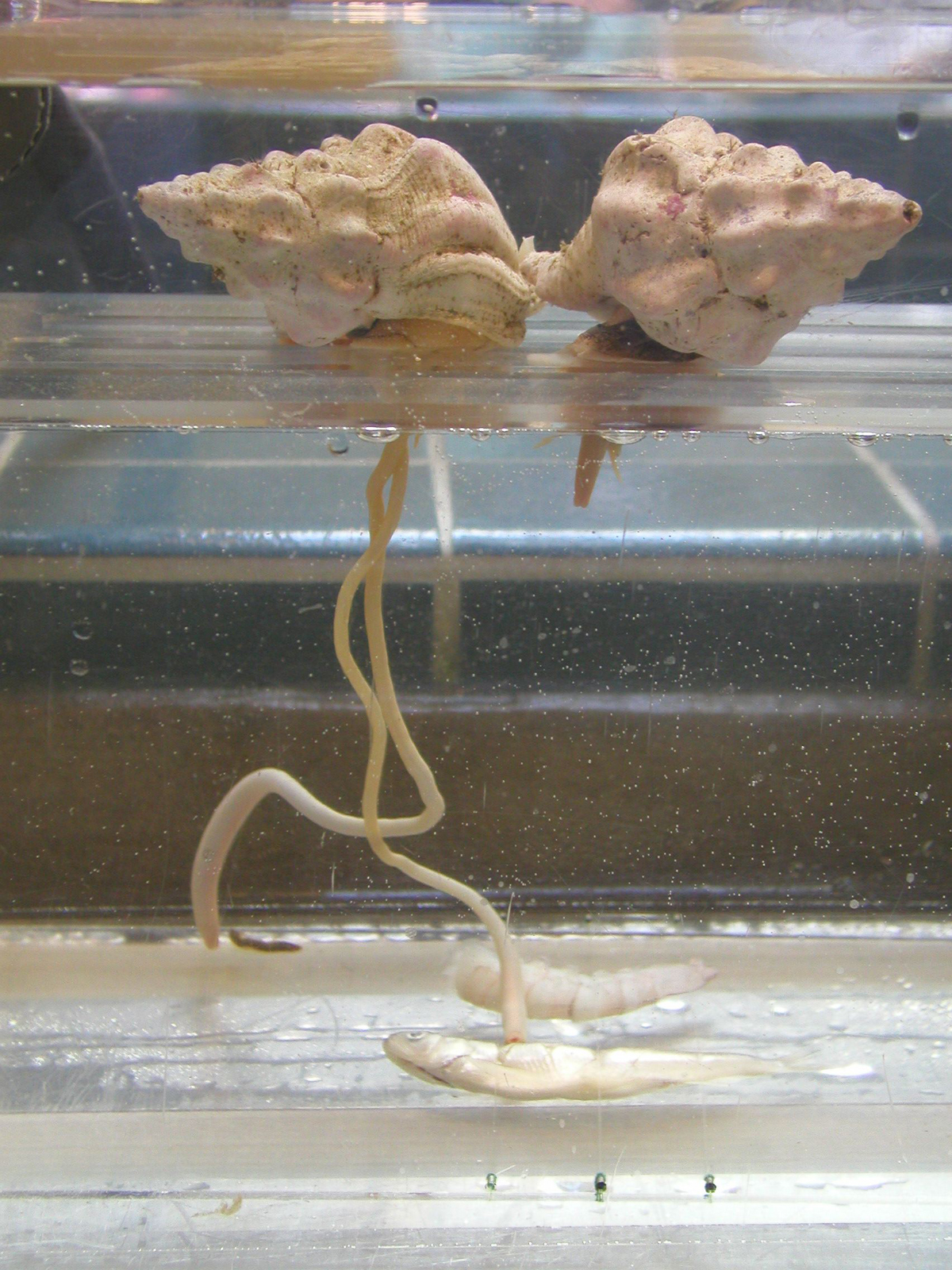
Three Kelletia kelletii in captivity (one hidden behind another) feed on dead fish, each one using a long, prehensile proboscis to reach down to the food

Kelletia kelletii is commonly found in subtidal kelp forests, rocky reefs and cobble-sand interfaces at depths ranging from 2 to 70 m. It is a conspicuous and abundant inhabitant of the nearshore subtidal reefs off southern California.

=== Feeding habits ===
Kelletia kelletii is a large carnivorous scavenger. It also occasionally feeds on live organisms as a predatory gastropod. As a scavenger, it appears to be attracted to almost any injured or dead animal on the sea floor. Often in subtidal areas large numbers of Kelletia kelletii have been observed moving towards and/or feeding upon one food item.

As a predator Kellet's whelk feeds on dead or alive polychaetes, bivalves, sea snails, crustaceans, ascidians. Additionally, they are known to scavenge on dead fish, echinoderms, and cephalopods.

Kelletia kelletii feeds with an extensible muscular proboscis which can be extended from the head region during feeding. Food is ingested by a muscular sucking action of the proboscis and a rasping of the radula. The proboscis is capable of extending approximately twice the length of the whelk's shell; it is this extension which allows Kelletia kelletii to reach food items in depressions or within the substratum. Most of the scavenger feedings by Kelletia kelletii attract more than one individual. In one instance, 85 were clustered around and feeding on a dead sea bass, Paralabrax sp., off Point Loma.

=== Interaction with sea star ===
Kellet's whelk has been observed feeding together at the same time with the Giant sea star Pisaster giganteus on common food items and thus these two species are trophically interrelated. Pisaster giganteus also preys on Kelletia kelletii more often than any other motile gastropod, and yet the whelks do not appear to be eaten in proportion to their abundance or accessibility in studied localitions. The sea star appears to be a major predator of the whelk, even though Kelletia kelletii makes up less than 10% of the diet of the sea star. The whelk does not display an avoidance response in the presence of Pisaster giganteus. Coexistence between the two species is believed possible as long as Kelletia kelletii does not become a preferred prey of the sea star. Usually these feeding convergences involved only a single sea star and two or three whelks.

These convergent feeding groups were not limited to Kelletia kelletii and Pisaster giganteus. Kelletia kelletii has also been observed feeding interspecifically with two other sea stars, Dermasterias imbricata and Pisaster brevispinus.

=== Life cycle ===
Females and males aggregate seasonally for mating. Fertilization is internal. Kellet's whelks reproduce annually, with egg-laying restricted to late spring and summer (in March, April and May). The snails form aggregations, with the average spawning cluster being about 15 to 20 snails. However, a few spawning aggregations contain between 200 and 300 individuals.

Oval-shaped egg capsules are deposited in clusters on hard substrates, including rock reef, discarded mollusk shells, and other Kellet's whelks, with egg laying speculated to be favored on substrate already containing Kellet's whelk egg capsules. Egg deposition may occur over several days at several locations, or all within one day. Egg capsules generally contain between 400 and 1200 eggs, with the height of the capsule, and number of eggs directly correlating to the size of the spawning female. Egg capsule height generally ranges between 0.2 and 0.4 inches (0.0051 and 0.0102 metres)illimeters) and capsules may occasionally contain up to 2200 eggs.

Embryos begin development within the capsule for about 30–34 days. They emerge into the water column as free swimming veliger larvae that are (planktonic and pelagic). Veliger size is inversely related to egg capsule size, with smaller capsules containing larger veligers. The protoconch of Kelletia kelletii has 0.5-1.5 whorls and a bulbous apex.

Laboratory culturing studies resulted in successful metamorphosis of 33% of larvae (n=10) from weeks 5.5 through 9 in the presence of live rock dominated by Petaloconchus montereyensis (a prey species of Kelletia kelletii), as well as 100% of larvae exposed to high concentrations of KCl in weeks 8 and 9; these pilot results suggest a planktonic duration of at least 5.5–9.0 weeks. Larvae are becoming more demersal as they are approaching competency.

Kelletia kelletii is slow-growing, and slow to mature. Studies have suggested a growth rate of 0.3 to 0.4 inches (0.0076 to 0.0102 metres)illimeters) per year until sexual maturity. Rosenthal (1970) reported onset of sexual maturity at c. 60 mm in shell length (defined as maximum shell length from the tip of the spire to the tip of the siphonal canal). Once sexual maturity is reached, growth slows considerably and it has been suggested that it takes at least 20 years to reach 3.5 inches (9.0 centimeters). In a year-long tagging study in southern California the majority of the 188 animals recaptured showed no growth at the end of the year.

Life cycle of Kelletia kelletii
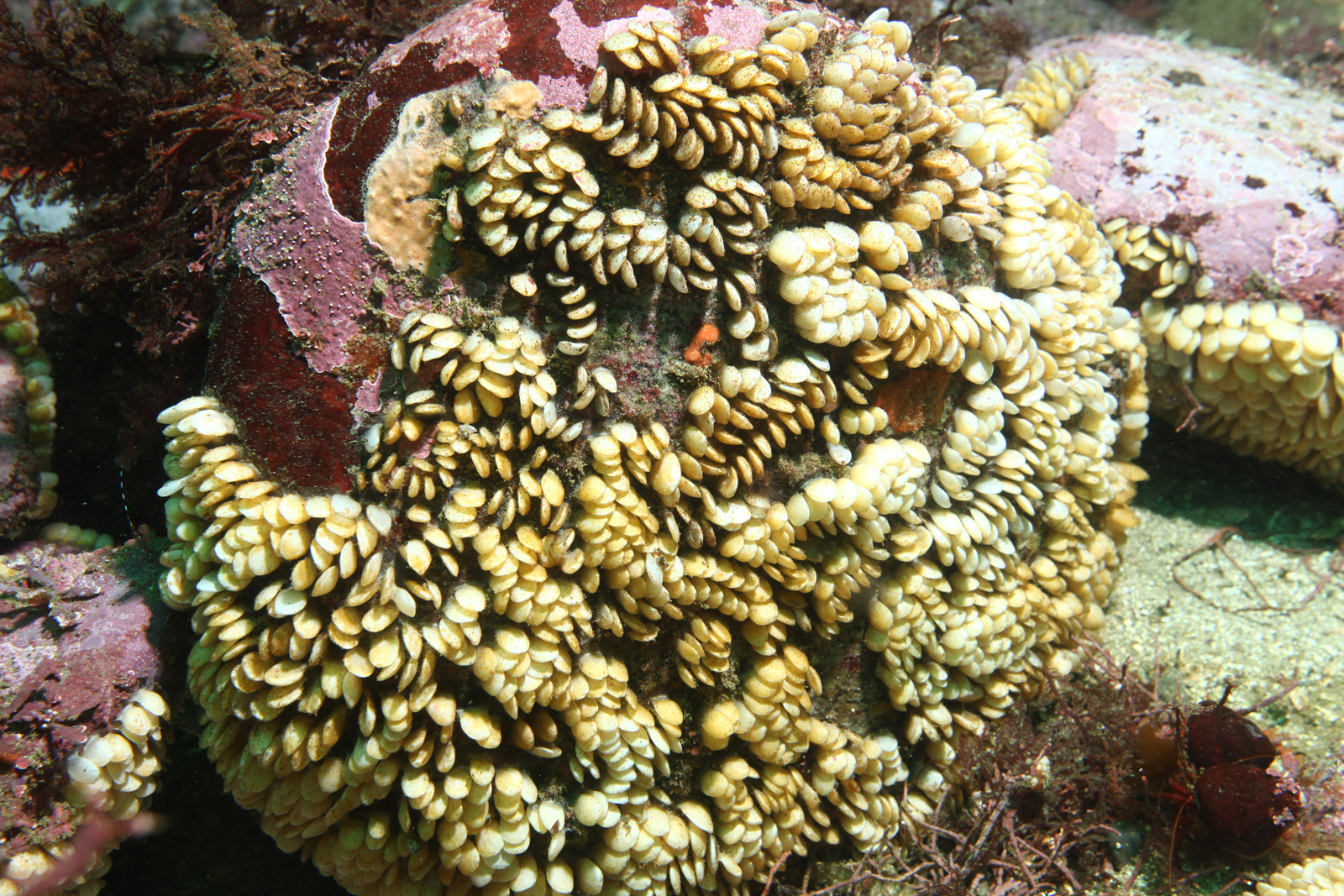
Eggs of Kelletia kelletii

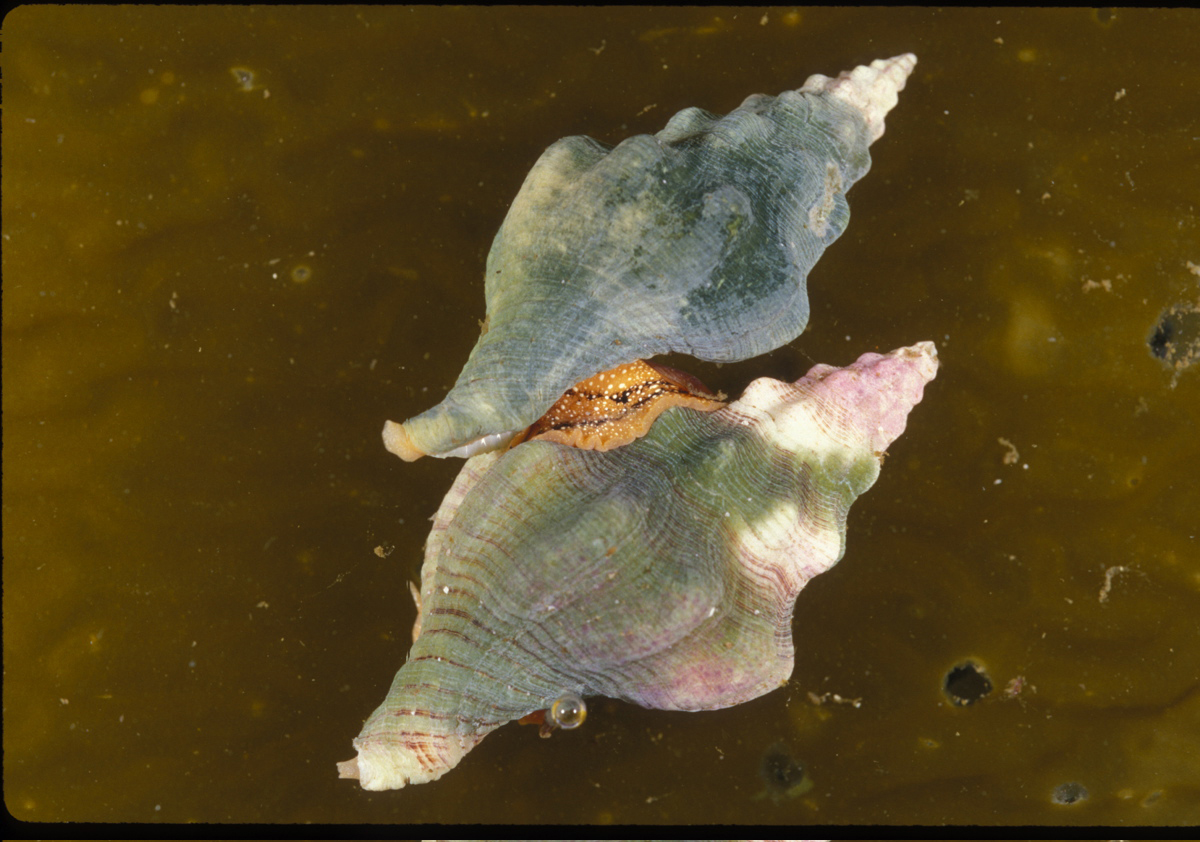
Two adults

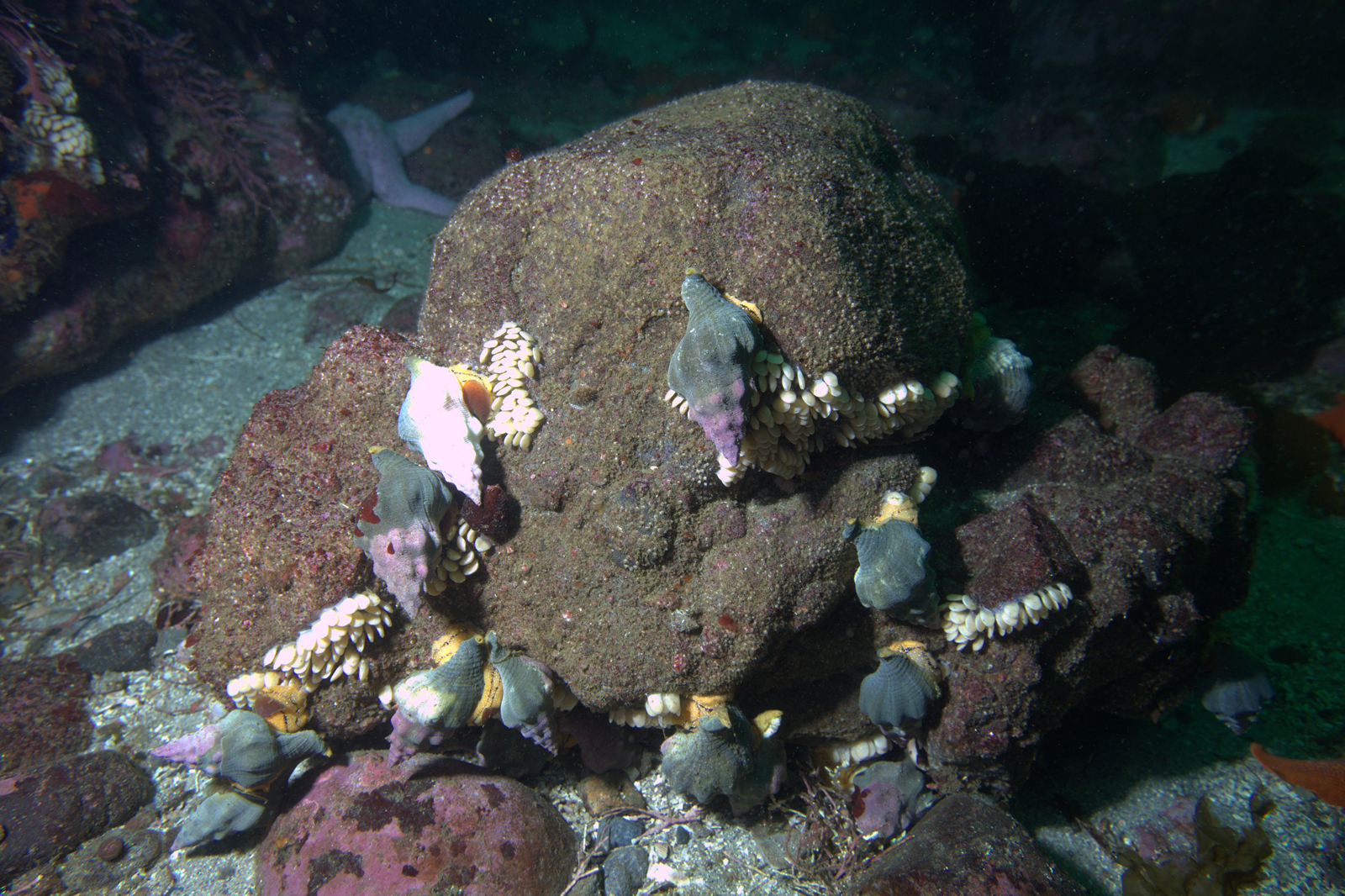
Egg laying occurs in spawning groups

=== Predators ===
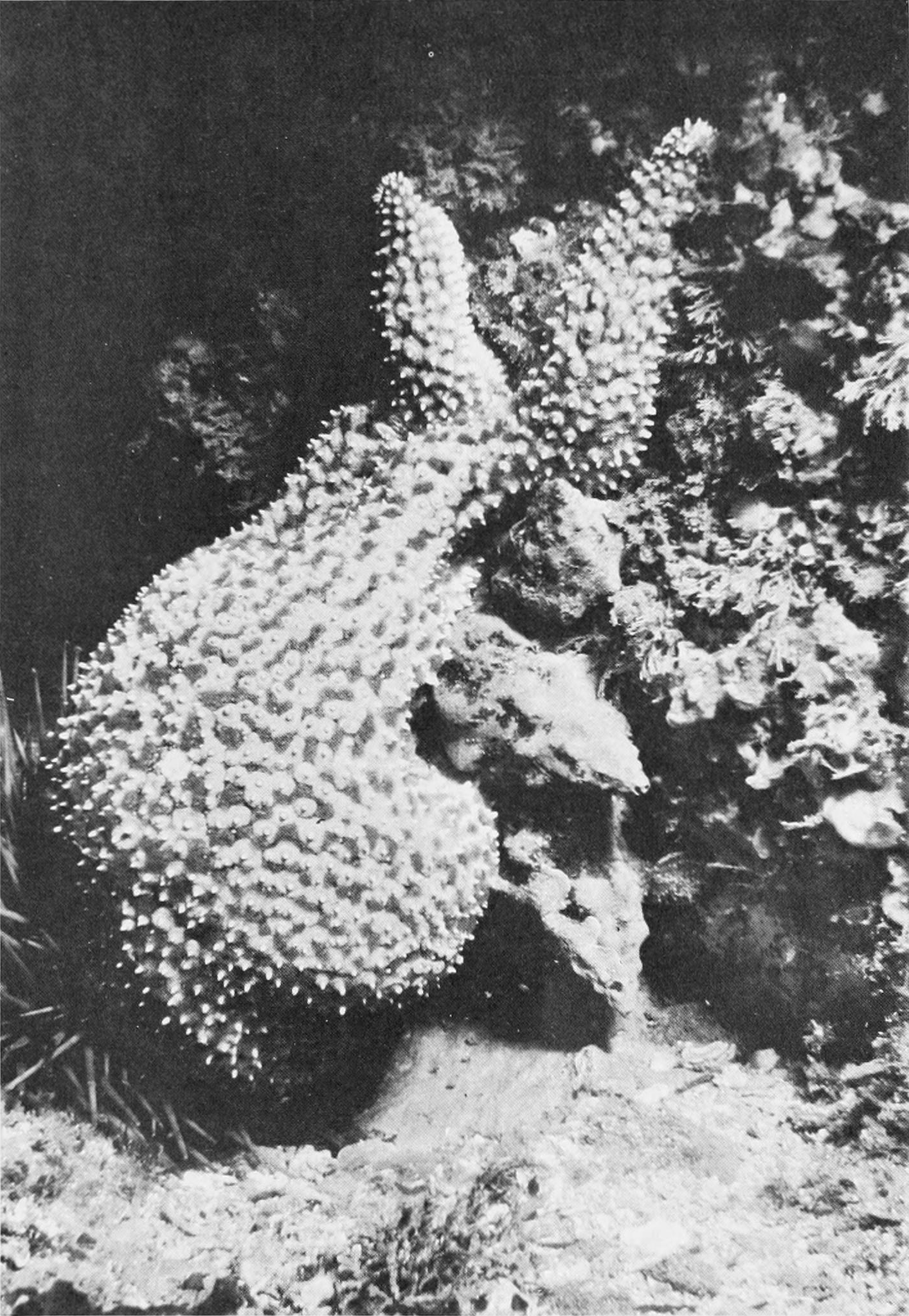
Giant sea stars and Kelletia kelletii

Predators of Kelletia kelletii:

- Pisaster giganteus
- Pisaster brevispinus
- Astrometis sertulifera
- Octopus bimaculatus
- Rhacochilus vacca
- Sea otters
- Horn sharks

== Human use ==
Shells of Kellet's whelks have been found in archeological and paleontological sites in southern California.

=== Fishery ===
The earliest recorded commercial landing data specific to Kellet's whelk dates back to 1979, but prior to this it may have been recorded as "miscellaneous mollusks" or "sea snails". Landings data indicate an increased intake starting in 1993 at 4590 pounds (2 metric tons), with the highest landings in 2006 being 191,177 pounds (87 metric tons). This represents an over forty-fold increase in thirteen years. Kellet's whelk landings have been reported at 24 ports from 1979 to 2008, with 80 percent of landings occurring at four ports. The majority of landings (439,828 pounds, 200 metric tons in 2008) occurred at Santa Barbara, with approximately 40 percent of the total landings reported. The other three top ports were Terminal Island, San Diego, and San Pedro. Dana Point is also an important port. Ex-vessel value from the 2008 commercial harvest of Kellet's whelks was approximately $132,700, with price per pound averaging $0.82 ($1.81 per kilogram). Since 1979, the fishery's ex-vessel value has ranged from $94 (1988) to approximately $136,000 (2007) and the ex-vessel price has ranged from $0.24 per pound ($0.53 per kilogram) in 1981 to $0.88 per pound ($1.94 per kilogram) in 1992. The average weight of a Kellet's whelk in a fishery is 150 g.

The food-finding ability of Kelletia kelletii by distance chemoreception has, on more than one occasion, been a nuisance to spiny lobster fishermen in some areas off southern California. These fishermen usually bait traps with dead fish in order to attract the spiny lobster Panulirus interruptus. Many times, however, a single lobster trap is found to contain dozens of Kelletia kelletii which were attracted to the trap by the "scent" of the bait.

Since 1979, 89 percent of all harvested Kellet's whelks have been taken incidentally in lobster and crab traps when they enter to prey on bait or on injured crustaceans. The other method of take is diving. Commercial divers are required to have a commercial fishing license, and may only take whelks that are further than 1,000 feet (300 meters) beyond the low tide mark, as the take of any snails is prohibited in the tidal invertebrate zone (Title 14, CCR, §123). Recreational take of Kellet's whelk by hand is allowed (Title 14, CCR, §29.05) outside of the 1,000-foot (300-meter) tidal invertebrate zone. Except where prohibited in state marine reserves, state marine parks and state marine conservation areas the bag limit is 35 animals, with no closed season. Ninety-nine percent of Kellet's whelks are used for human consumption., and are mainly sold in live fish markets.

The fact that this species is slow-growing, slow to mature, and makes seasonal aggregations for mating, all mean that this recently targeted fishery species is vulnerable to overexploitation. The Kelletia kelletii fishery has experienced a rapid increase in landings since 1995, prompting the California Department of Fish and Game to designate the species as an "emerging fishery" (California Regulatory Notice Register 2011 43-Z). New commercial and recreational fishing regulations for Kellet's whelk were established in 2012.
