= P. giganteus =

P. giganteus may refer to:

- Pisaster giganteus, the giant sea star, a sea star species found along the western coast of North America
- Pteropus giganteus, the Indian flying-fox, a bat species found in Bangladesh, China, and India

== Synonyms ==
- Priodontes giganteus, a synonym for Priodontes maximus, the giant armadillo, a mammal species
