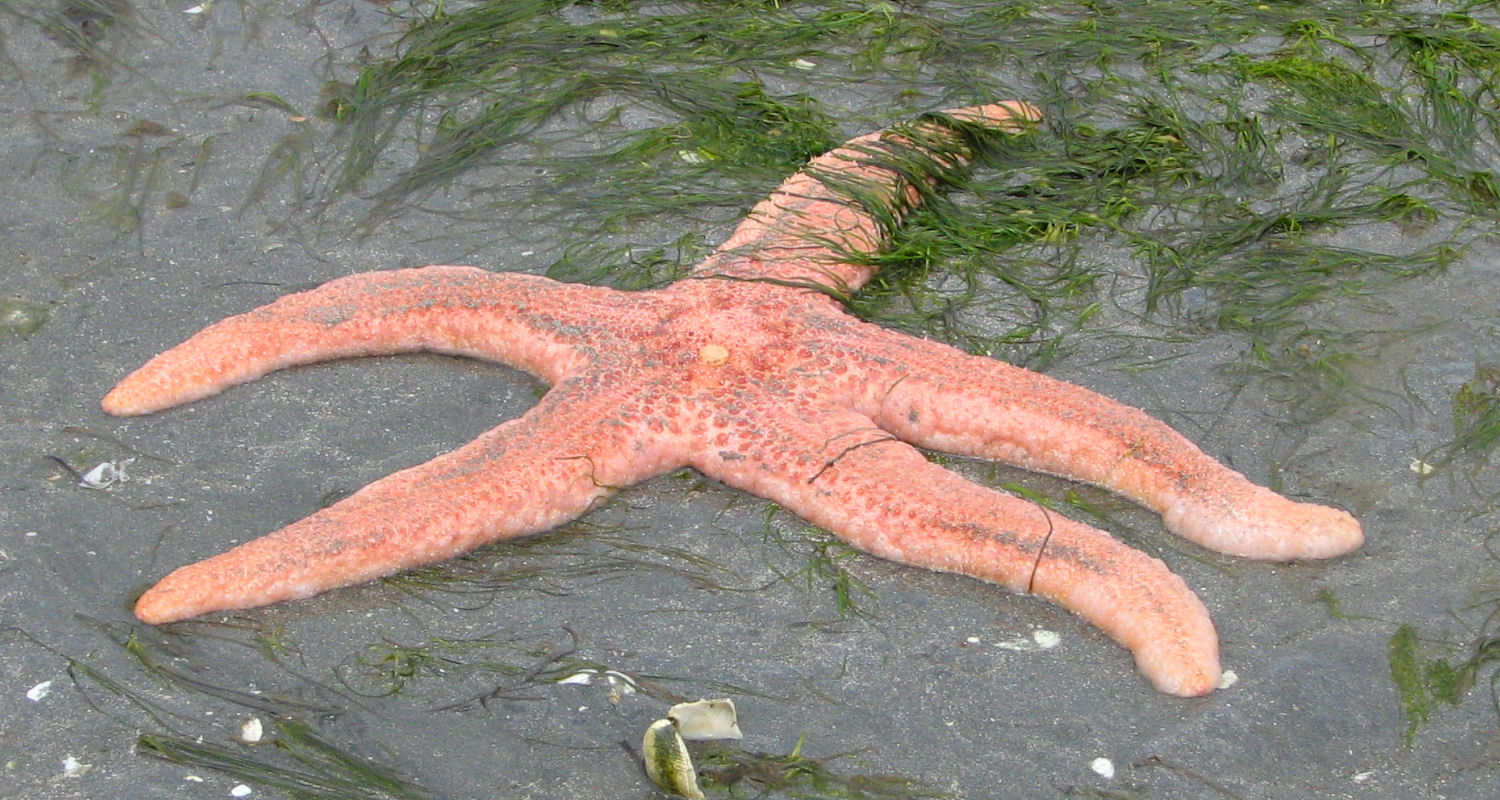
- Pisaster brevispinus

Scientific classification
- Kingdom: Animalia
- Phylum: Echinodermata
- Class: Asteroidea
- Order: Forcipulatida
- Family: Asteriidae
- Genus: Pisaster; Müller and Troschel, 1840

= Pisaster =

Genus of starfishes

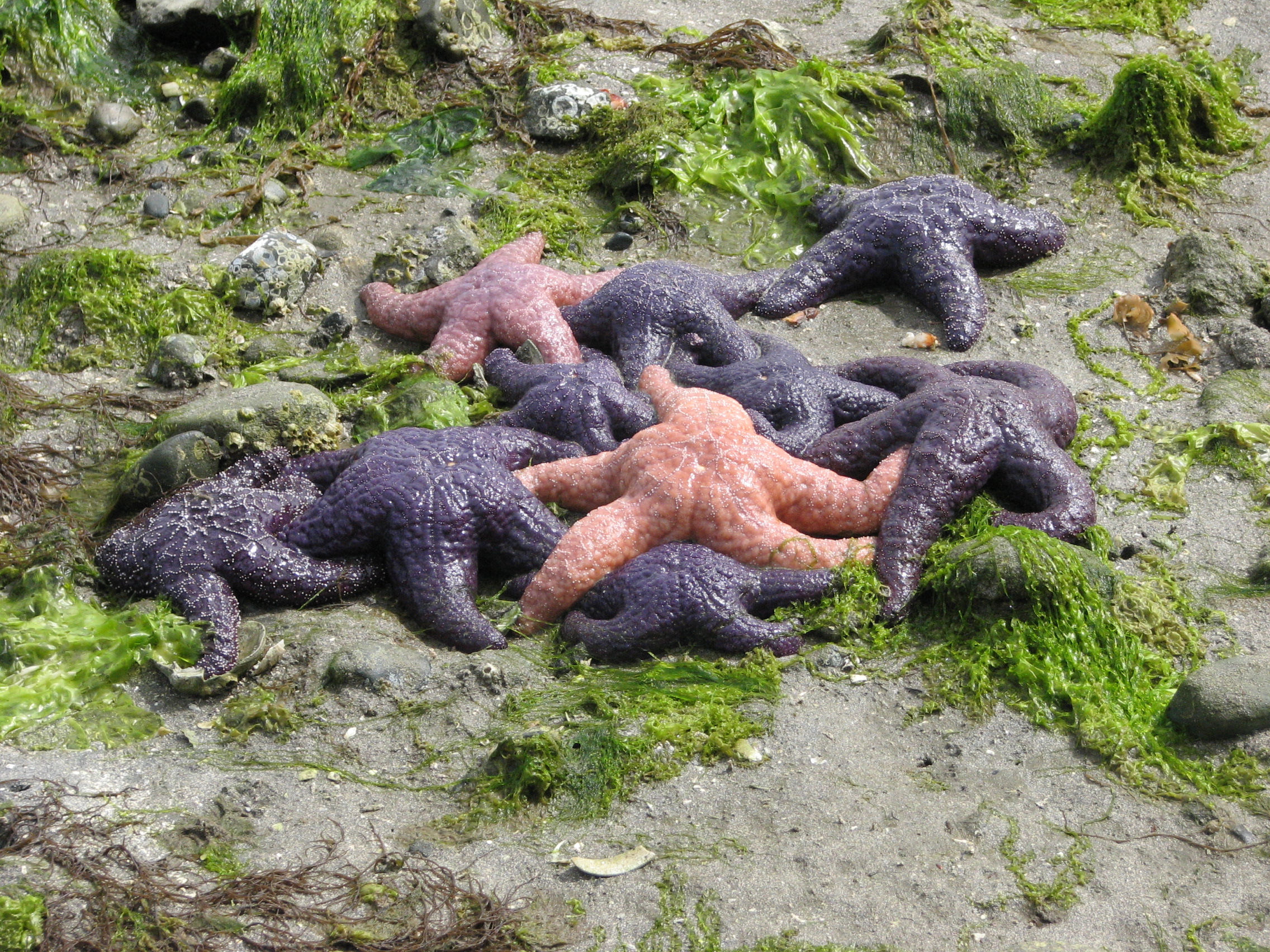
Ochre sea star at low tide, Saltspring Island, British Columbia

Pisaster (from Greek πίσος, "pea", and ἀστήρ, "star") is a genus of Pacific sea stars that includes three species, P. brevispinus, P. giganteus, and P. ochraceus. Their range extends along the Pacific coast from Alaska to southern California in the intertidal zone. The largest individuals of Pisaster can reach diameters of up to 70 cm (28 in) across; they all develop five arms, but some may be lost from injury or disease, and occasionally the re-growth of an injured arm will result in an individual with more than five arms.

Sea stars in the genus Pisaster are all predators; the ochre sea star is the best-characterized of these, and is considered a "keystone" predator that controls the relative abundance of many other species in the ecosystem.

== Species ==
Image	Scientific name	Common name	Distribution
	Pisaster brevispinus	(Giant) pink or short-spined sea star	coast of North America from Sitka, Alaska to La Jolla, California.
	Pisaster giganteus	Giant sea star	coast of North America from British Columbia to Southern California.
	Pisaster ochraceus	Ochre sea star	coast of North America from Prince William Sound in Alaska to Baja California.
