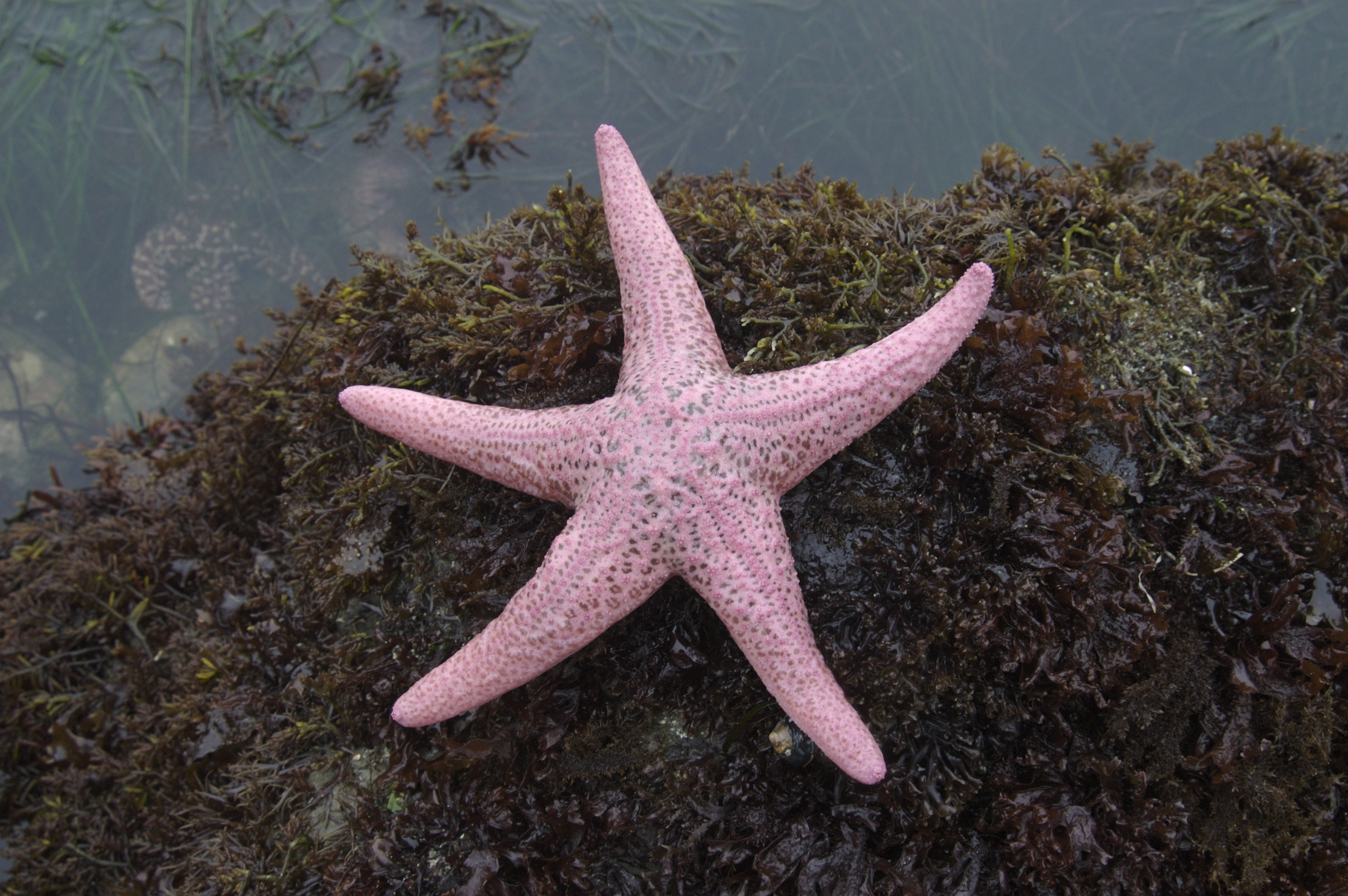

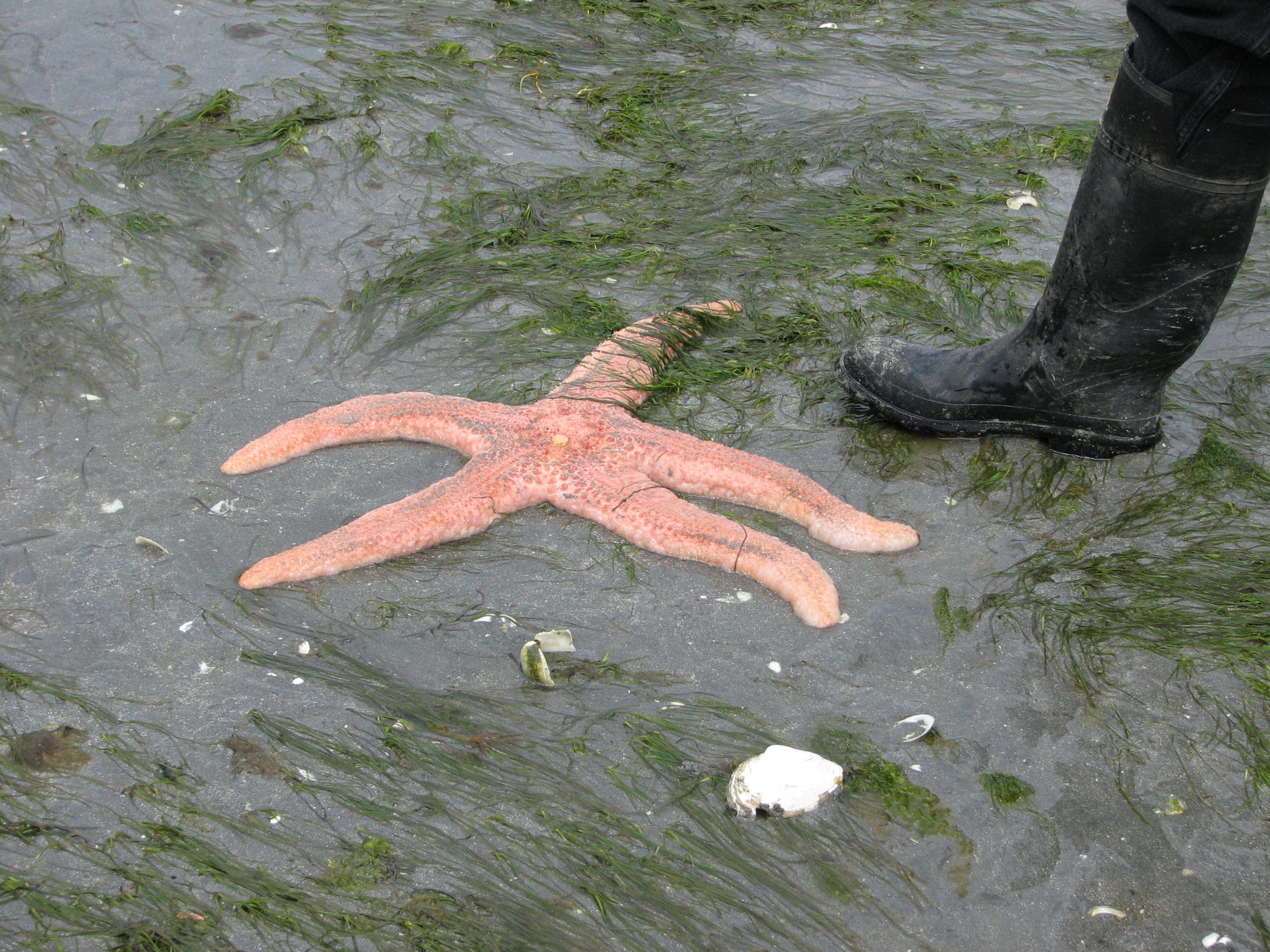
- Scale comparison against human foot

Scientific classification
- Kingdom: Animalia
- Phylum: Echinodermata
- Class: Asteroidea
- Order: Forcipulatida
- Family: Asteriidae
- Genus: Pisaster
- Species: P. brevispinus

Binomial name
- Pisaster brevispinus (Stimpson, 1857)

Synonyms
- Asterias brevispina Stimpson, 1857; Asterias papulosa Verrill, 1909; Asterias paucispina Stimpson, 1862; Pisaster papulosus (Verrill, 1909); Pisaster paucispinus (Stimpson, 1862)

= Pisaster brevispinus =

Species of starfish

Pisaster brevispinus, commonly called the pink sea star, giant pink sea star, or short-spined sea star, is a species of sea star in the northeast Pacific Ocean. It was first described to science by William Stimpson in 1857. The type specimen was collected on a sandy bottom, 18 metres (59 ft) deep, near the mouth of San Francisco Bay.

== Description ==
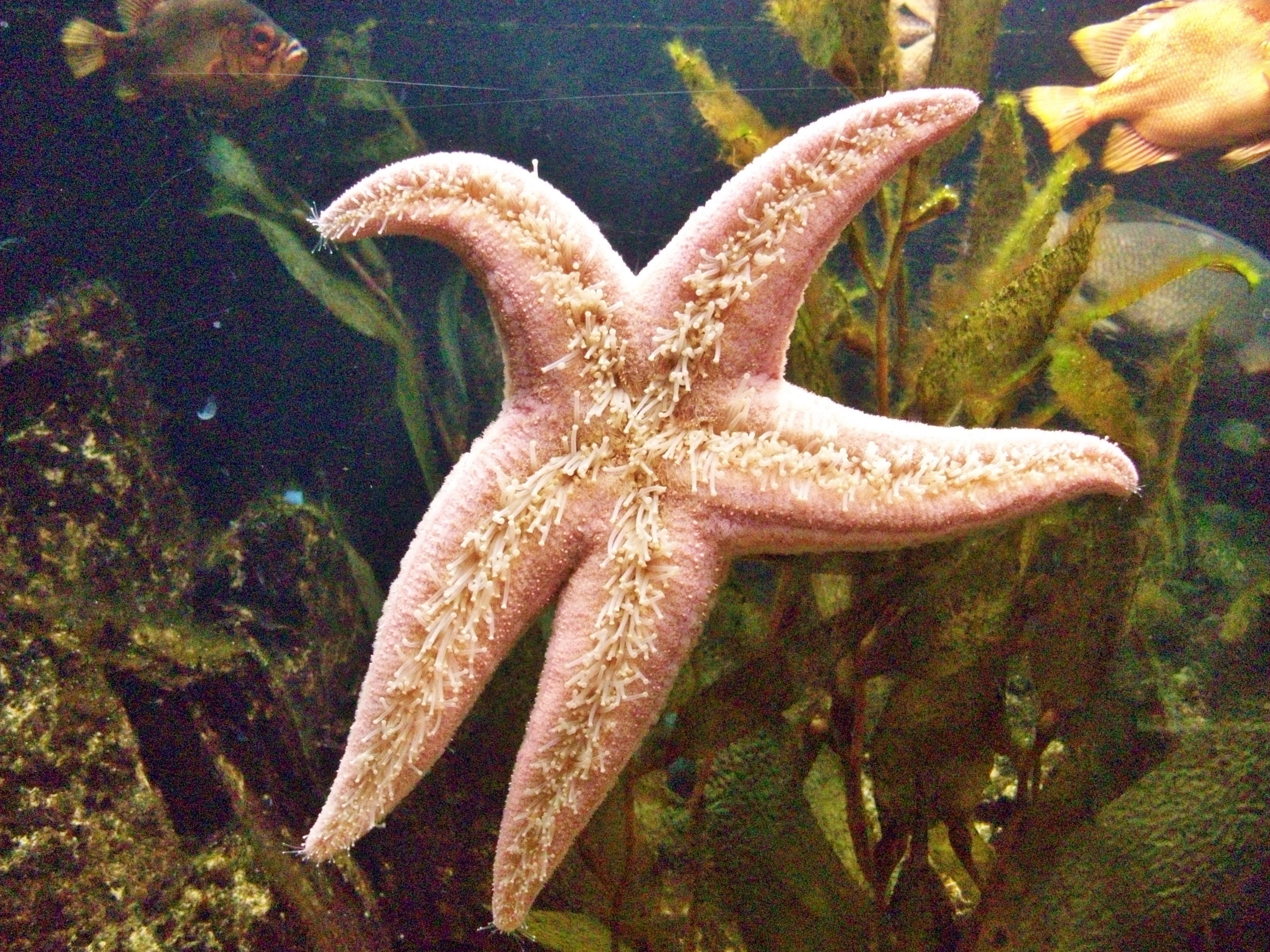
Pink seastar's bottom side

The pink sea star has five thick arms and a large central disc. It is one of the largest sea stars in the world. While typically having a diameter of 320 millimetres (13 in), monsters up to 90 centimetres (35 in) have been found. The largest animals may weigh 4.5 kilograms (9.9 lb). The upper, arboral, surface of this star is generally pink, sometimes with shadings of gray. The radius of the arms is 2.8 to 5.0 times the radius of the central disc.

The central disc contains an obvious madreporite on its upper surface. This structure filters water used by the animal. The mouth of the animal is found on the underside of the central disc.

There are short, 2 millimetres (0.079 in) spines on the upper surface of the star. While a row of spines generally runs along the top of each arm, they are otherwise scattered across the animal in no particular pattern singly or in clumps of two or three. Both the upper surface and lower surfaces contain tiny pincers, pedicellariae, which likely are used to get rid of encrusting organisms which would otherwise grow on the star.

On the lower, or oral side of the star, deep grooves radiate from the mouth which contain four rows of tube feet. The star uses these to move around, and to capture its prey. The tube feet around the mouth are particularly long, at least equal to the radius of the central disc, to aid in digging prey from the sea bottom.

== Distribution and habitat ==
This sea star occurs along the coast of North America from Sitka, Alaska to La Jolla, California. It is found in Puget Sound. The pink sea star is found in relatively shallow water from the lower intertidal zone to 110 metres (360 ft) deep. The animal does not tolerate being out of water very well, so it is generally found on the beach only during very low tides. It prefers quiet waters such as bays and harbors rather than the open ocean coast. It lives on the sea bed, preferring sandy and muddy bottoms where its main prey is found. It can, however, sometimes be found on rocky bottoms or pilings. It avoids areas of low salinity.

== Reproduction and life cycle ==
Pink sea stars are primarily gonochoric, which is to say that individuals are either male or female. Each arm contains two gonads. These stars lift their central discs off the bottom to spawn, releasing their microscopic gametes into the water. Their eggs are 165 micrometres (0.0065 in) in diameter. It is thought that groups of stars use environmental signals to coordinate spawning to increase the chances of fertilization. Once fertilization has occurred, the zygote develops into a planktonic larva which feeds on small algae. The larva proceeds through several developmental phases. It becomes a gastrula in 2 to 3 days, a bipinnaria in 5 days, and finally a brachiolaria. Towards the end of the last stage the larva develops a large sack like structure, a primordium, and begins searching for a suitable surface on which to settle. After settling to the bottom, the larva develops into a juvenile sea star.

== Feeding behavior ==
The pink sea star is a carnivore and scavenger. Its main prey is bivalves. It hunts, captures, and eats cockles, including Nuttall's cockle, butter clams, jackknife clams, horse clams, littleneck clams, and geoduck clams. How it locates buried clams is unknown, but once it finds a buried clam it will dig down to it by using its tube feet to push bits of sediment from near its mouth to the ends of its arms. Holes as deep as 10 centimetres (3.9 in) have been observed.

It is a slow-motion hunter; it may take it several days to dig its prey from the sediment, latch on to it with its tube feet, and pull the valves open. At this point, the star everts its stomach through its mouth and forces it into the shell. The star can push its stomach as far as 8 centimetres (3.1 in) from its mouth. The pink sea star secretes digestive fluids and eats the bivalve inside its own shell.

This star is opportunistic in its feeding and will eat other animals besides bivalves when available. It will eat sand dollars, snails, including Kellet's whelk, barnacles, polychaete worms, and small Dungeness crabs. It feeds on carrion, including dead fish and squid.

It is competitive with sunflower stars and will fight with them over prey items.

== Predators ==
Sea otters have been observed to rip off an arm of this sea star to eat the gonads inside. Gulls will attempt to consume a pink sea star exposed at low tide. They are also preyed upon by other sea stars, such as the morning sun star. Sheep crabs also eat these sea stars. It is likely that the largest animals escape predation simply because of their size.
