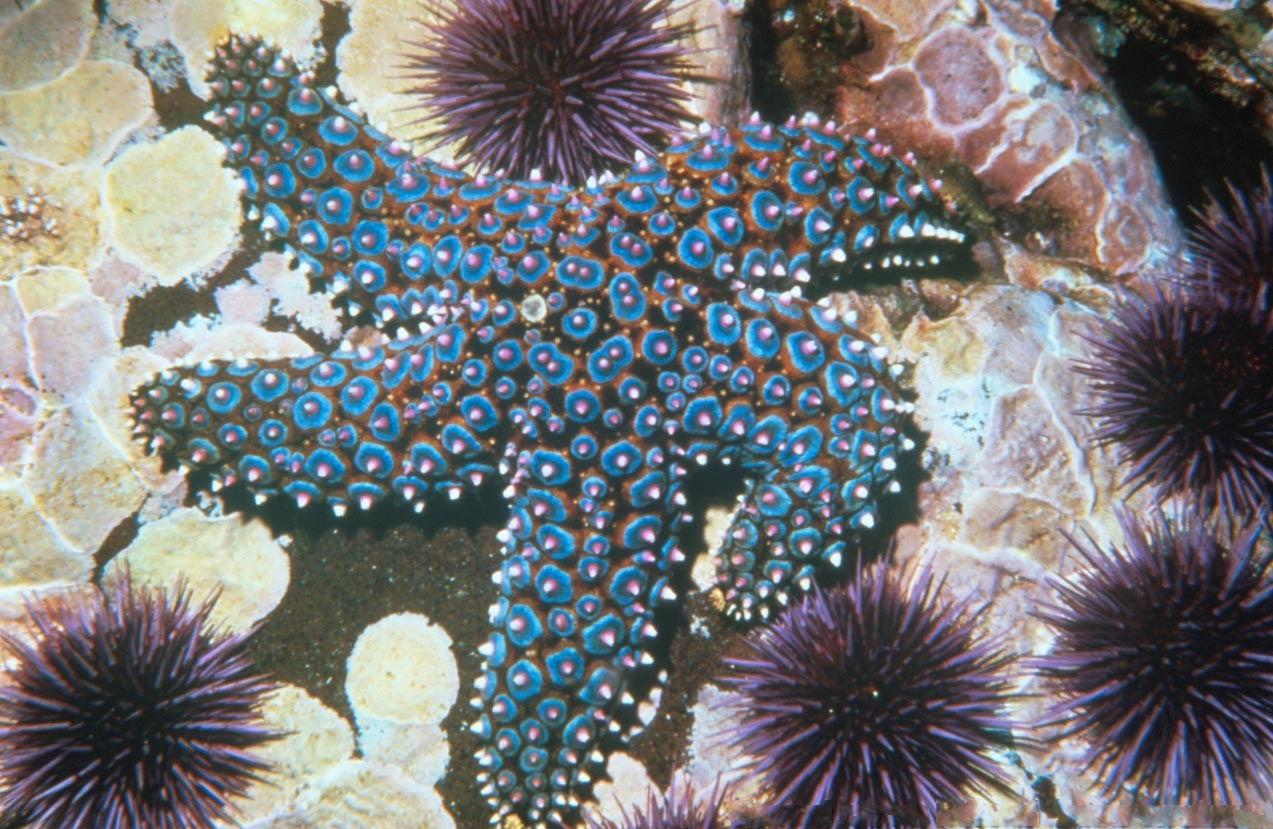

Scientific classification
- Kingdom: Animalia
- Phylum: Echinodermata
- Class: Asteroidea
- Order: Forcipulatida
- Family: Asteriidae
- Genus: Pisaster
- Species: P. giganteus

Binomial name
- Pisaster giganteus Stimpson, 1857

= Pisaster giganteus =

Species of starfish

Pisaster giganteus, the giant sea star, giant spined star, or knobby sea star is a species of sea star that lives along the western coast of North America from Southern California to British Columbia. It makes its home on rocky shores near the low tide mark. It preys on mollusks. It can grow as large as 24 in (61 cm) in diameter. Its color varies from brown to red or purple.

== Reproduction and regeneration ==
Giant sea stars have small eggs, and their sperm contain spherical heads. Once their larvae are born, they are bilaterally symmetrical. By the time they mature and reach adulthood they are centered on a set point with radial symmetry to their bodies. The gonads of the giant sea star grow in a winters time just in time for spawning season between the months of March and April.

== Habitat ==
Giant sea stars are usually found around the protected coastlines with low tide. They can often be found attached to rocks, pier supports or in the sand.

== Description ==
Giant sea stars have a dense body with wide arms. Its surface is either tan or brown, but on occasion the giant sea star can have a yellowish or grayish surface. They contain thick, blunt spines that are bluish in color with white, pink or purple tips that are swollen and surrounded by brown fuzz and pedicellariae that have a plier like shape. These pedicellariae are used as a protective mechanism against predators. They have no distinct pattern. They range from 36–48 cm (14–19 in) from the tip of one arm to the other. They are usually found up to 88 m (289 ft) down in the water.

== Predators and prey ==
The giant sea star only has a few predators. Sea otters and sea birds feed on giant sea stars, and their larvae are eaten by certain types of sea snails. They prey on several kinds of sea organisms including barnacles, gastropods, bivalves, and limpets. It eats its prey by extending its stomach so it can fit into tiny gaps, such as mussel shells.

== Sources ==
- Landenberger, Donald E. "Studies on Selective Feeding in the Pacific Starfish Pisaster in Southern California." Ecology, Vol. 49, No. 6 (Nov., 1968), pp. 1062-1075. Online. March 3, 2008.
- Taxonomicon
